= List of schools in Tamworth =

The following is a list of schools in Tamworth, Australia.

== Government schools ==
School	Suburb
Bullimbal School	South Tamworth
Farrer Memorial Agricultural High School	Calala
Hillvue Public School	Hillvue
Nemingha Public School	Nemingha
Oxley High School	North Tamworth
Oxley Vale Public School	Oxley Vale
Parry School	West Tamworth
Peel High School	West Tamworth
Tamworth High School	South Tamworth
Tamworth Public School	East Tamworth
Tamworth South Public School	South Tamworth
Tamworth West Public School	West Tamworth
Timbumburi Public School	Kingswood
Westdale Public School	Westdale

== Non-government schools ==
School	Suburb
Calrossy Anglican School – Brisbane Street Campus Secondary Girls	East Tamworth
Calrossy Anglican School – William Cowper Campus Secondary Boys	North Tamworth
Calrossy Anglican School – William Cowper Campus Primary	North Tamworth
Carinya Christian School	Calala
McCarthy Catholic College	North Tamworth
St Edward's Catholic School	South Tamworth
St Joseph's Catholic School	West Tamworth
St Mary's Campus of St Nicholas School	Oxley Vale
St Nicholas Catholic School	East Tamworth
