= Cockburn River =

Coordinates: 31°08′S 151°00′E

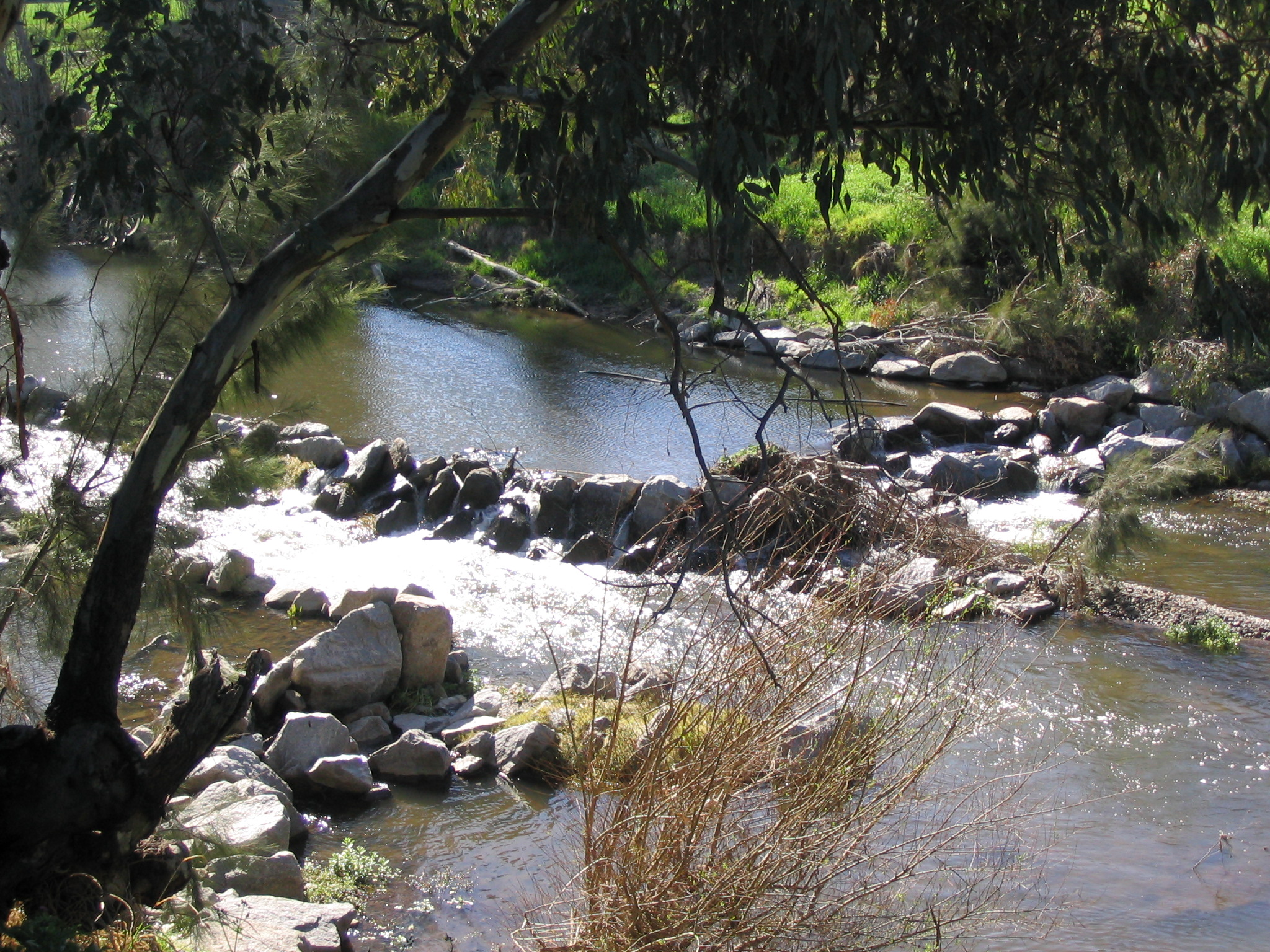
- A rock-chute, on the Cockburn River, near Tamworth
- Etymology: In honour of George Cockburn

Location
- Country: Australia
- State: New South Wales
- Region: IBRA: New England Tablelands
- District: Northern Tablelands
- Municipality: Tamworth

Physical characteristics
- Source: Moonbi Range
  - location: near Limbri
  - elevation: 493 m (1,617 ft)
- Mouth: confluence with the Peel River
  - location: west of Nemingha
  - elevation: 384 m (1,260 ft)
- Length: 33.6 km (20.9 mi)

Basin features
- Tributaries
  - left: Mulla Mulla Creek, Swamp Oak Creek
  - right: Jamiesons Creek, Moonbi Creek

Cockburn River (/ˈkoʊbərn/ KOH-bərn) is a perennial river that is part of the Namoi catchment within the Murray–Darling basin, located in the Northern Tablelands district of New South Wales, Australia.

The river rises in the west slopes of Moonbi Range, near Limbri and then flows generally west south west, joined by four minor tributaries, towards its confluence with the Peel River at Nemingha; dropping 109 metres (358 ft) over its course of 33 kilometres (21 mi).

The river was first encountered by European explorers on 4 September 1818 during an expedition led by the Surveyor-General of New South Wales, John Oxley, who named the river in honour of Admiral Sir George Cockburn.

From upstream to downstream, the Cockburn River flows through or near the localities of Limbri, Moonbi, Kootingal, Tintinhull and Nemingha. A section of the Main North railway line runs along the valley of the Cockburn River.

The Cockburn River is also one of the fastest flowing rivers in the southern hemisphere. It is home to fish species including catfish, yellow belly, and European carp; the last have decimated the native fish stocks to the point that they are getting harder to find. There are small areas of irrigated cropping along the banks of the river and the surrounding hills are mostly used for grazing.

== See also ==
- List of rivers of Australia
- Rivers of New South Wales
