= Westdale, New South Wales =

Outer suburb of Tamworth, New South Wales

Westdale
- Suburb
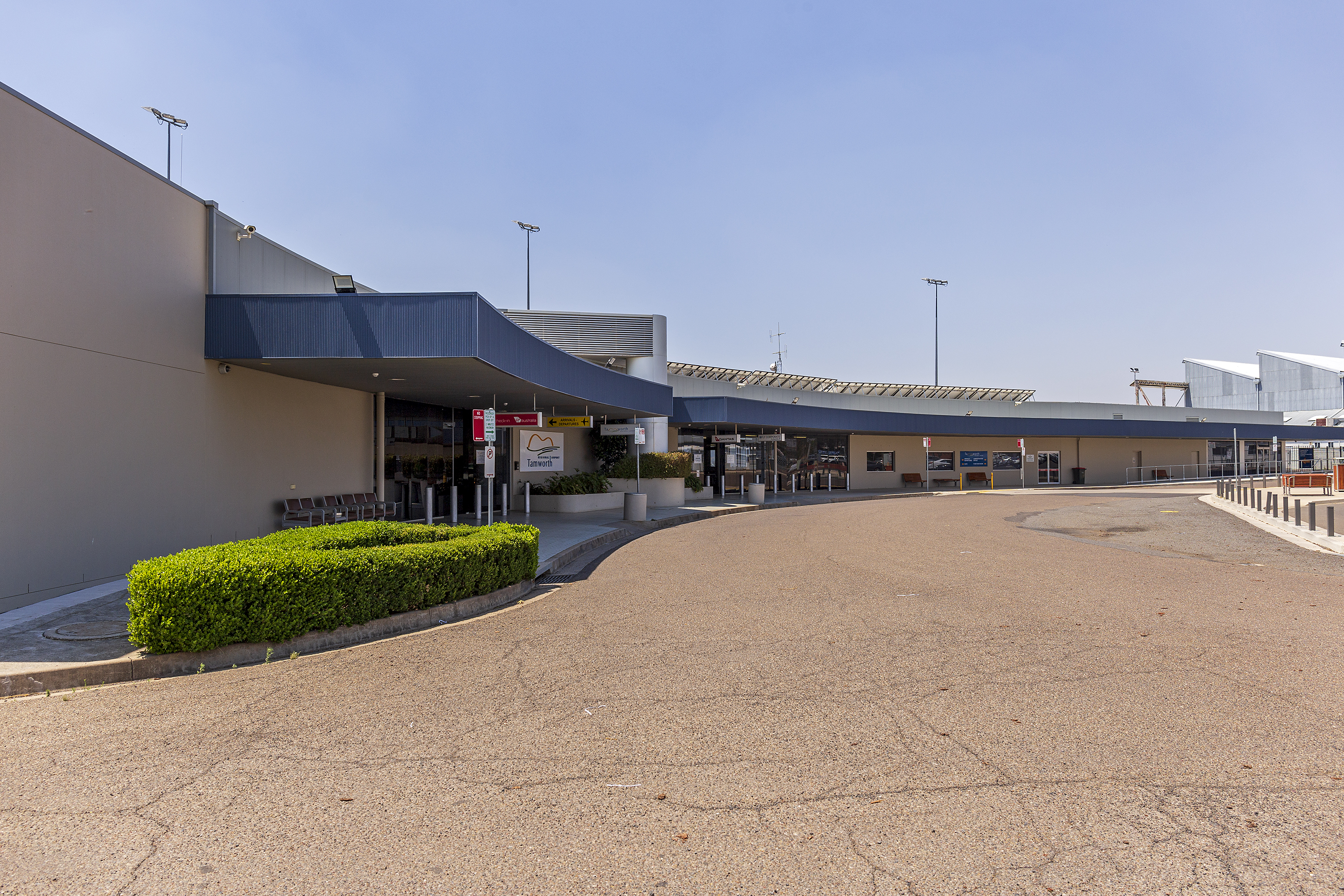
- Tamworth Regional Airport, New South Wales, in Westdale.
- Country: Australia
- State: New South Wales
- LGA: Tamworth Regional Council

Population
  - Total: 2,963 (2021 census)
Suburbs around Westdale
Wallamore	Oxley Vale	Oxley Vale
Winton	Westdale	Taminda
Bithramere	Warral	West Tamworth

Westdale is a semi-rural outer suburb and locality in Tamworth, New South Wales. Westdale contains the Tamworth Regional Airport and the Tamworth City Speedway.

== Demographics ==
In the 2021 census, Westdale's population was 2,963, up from 2,755 in 2016.
