= Tamworth High School =

Location
- Willis Street, South Tamworth, New England region of New South Wales; Australia
- Coordinates: 31°06′19″S 150°55′01″E

Information
- Type: Government-funded co-educational comprehensive secondary day school
- Established: 1919; 107 years ago
- School district: Peel; Regional North
- Educational authority: NSW Department of Education
- Principal: Mr Paul Davis
- Teaching staff: 69.8 FTE (2023)
- Years: 7–12
- Enrolment: 631 (2021)
- Campus type: Regional
- Colours: Black and blue
- Website: tamworth-h.schools.nsw.gov.au

Tamworth High School is a government-funded co-educational comprehensive secondary day school, located in Willis Street, South Tamworth, a suburb of the Tamworth Regional Council local government area in the New England region of New South Wales, Australia.

Established in 1919, the school enrolled approximately 631 students in 2023, from Year 7 to Year 12, of whom 40 percent identified as Indigenous Australians and 6 percent were from a language background other than English. The school is operated by the NSW Department of Education; the principal is Mr Paul Davis.

== See also ==
- List of government schools in New South Wales: Q–Z
- List of schools in Tamworth
- Education in Australia
- Peel High School
