= Daruka, New South Wales =

Daruka Tamworth, New South Wales
- Population: 817 (2011 census)
- Postcode(s): 2340
- LGA(s): Tamworth Regional Council
- State electorate(s): Tamworth
- Federal division(s): New England
Suburbs around Daruka:
Moore Creek	Moore Creek	Moonbi
Moore Creek	Daruka	Kootingal
North Tamworth	East Tamworth	Tintinhull

Daruka is an outer suburb of Tamworth, New South Wales, in the city's north. It is located in the Daruka Valley north of the suburb North Tamworth and east of the locality of Moore Creek and is bounded in the north by the stream Moore Creek. To the east of Daruka is Moonbi and Kootingal. The neighbourhood of Upper Moore Creek 30°56′55″S 150°59′05″E is within the north of the locality.

== Locality ==
Daruka Estate starts on Daruka Road to the west and ends at the end of Tintinhull Road to the east. Daruka Estate is mostly a medium to high range socio economic class due to the larger property sizes.

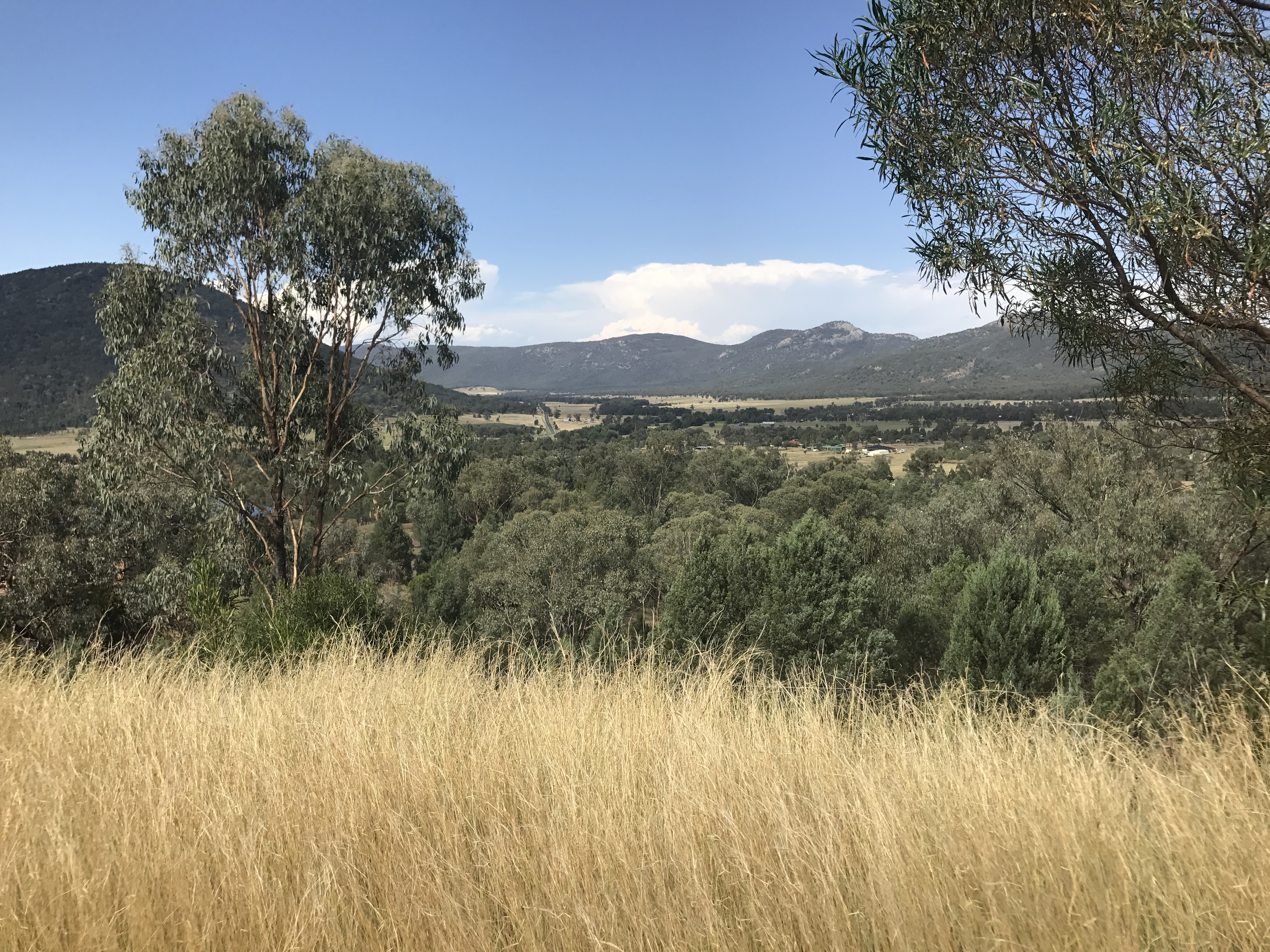
Vista of the Moonbie Range from Catherine Way, Daruka
