= John Oxley =

English explorer and surveyor (1784–1828)

John Joseph William Molesworth Oxley
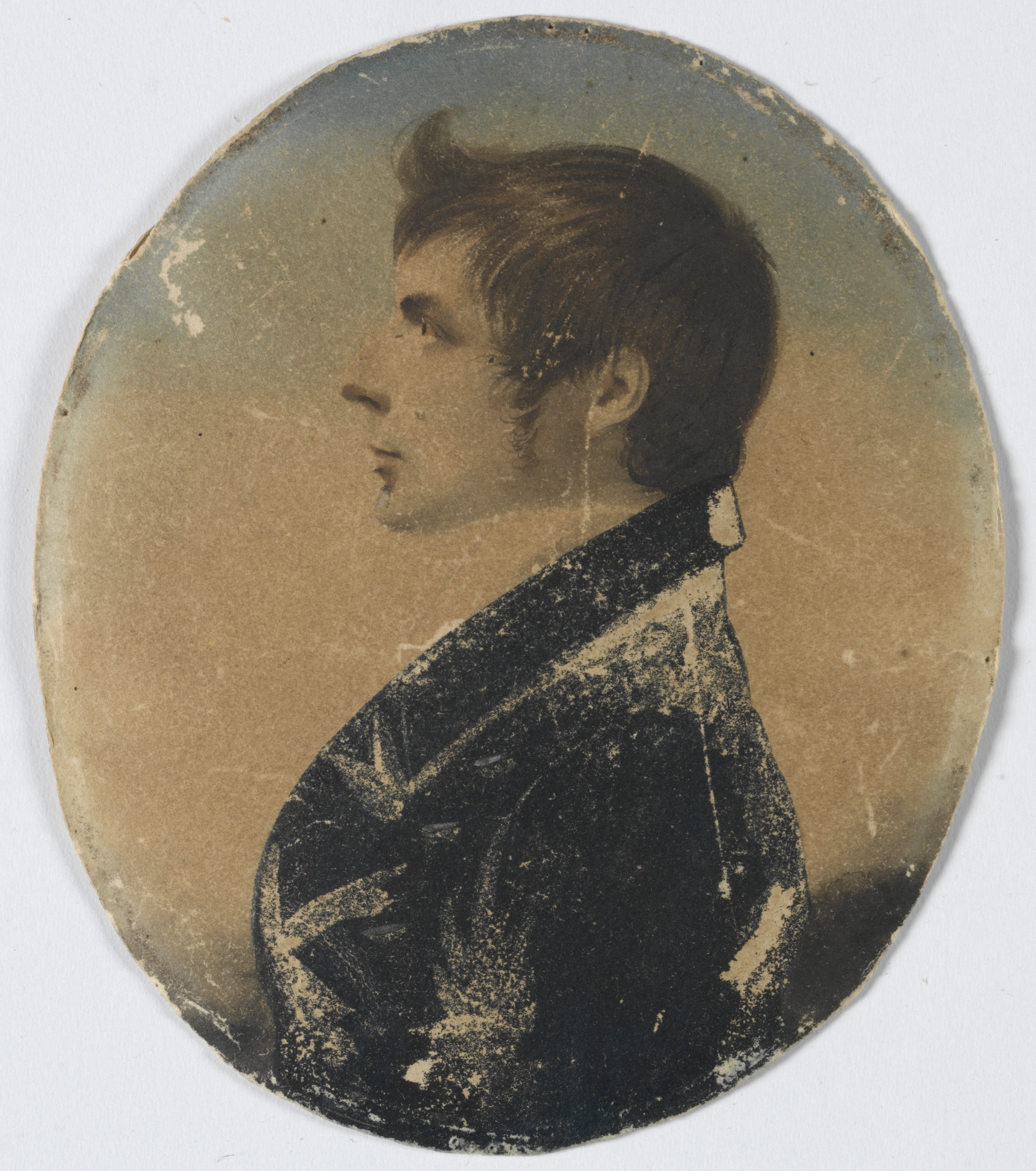
- John Oxley, 1810
- Born: 1784; Kirkham Abbey, Yorkshire, England
- Died: 1828 (aged 43–44); Camden, New South Wales, Australia
- Occupations: Explorer; surveyor
- Years active: 1799−1824

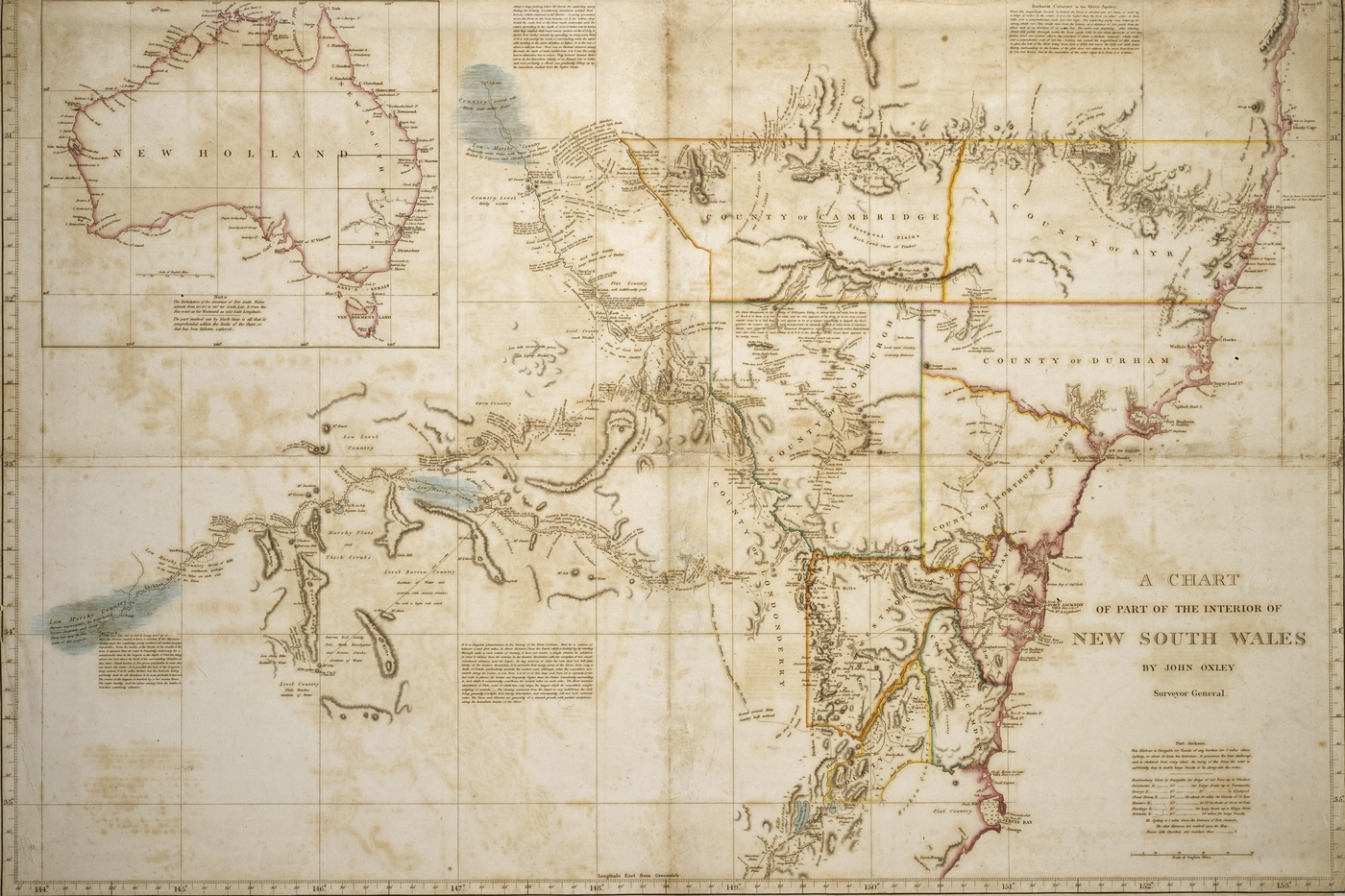
Oxley's map of the interior of NSW, 1822

John Joseph William Molesworth Oxley (1784 – 25 May 1828) was an English explorer and surveyor of Australia in the early period of British colonisation. He served as Surveyor General of New South Wales and is perhaps best known for his exploration of the Tweed River and the Brisbane River in what is now the state of Queensland.

== Early life ==
John Oxley was born in 1784 at Kirkham Abbey near Westow in Yorkshire, England, and baptised at Bulmer in St Martin's Church on 6 July 1784. He was the eldest of eight children of John and Arabella Oxley and was a Protestant.

== Naval career ==
In 1799 (aged 15), he entered the Royal Navy as a midshipman on the Venerable (1784). He travelled to Australia in October 1802 as master's mate of the naval vessel Buffalo, which carried out coastal surveying (including the survey of Western Port), and this first stay in the Colonies would last for five years. In 1805, Oxley became acting lieutenant of the Buffalo and traveled to Van Diemen's Land the following year in charge of the Estramina.

He returned to England in 1807 and from there he was appointed first lieutenant of HMS Porpoise, a British sloop of war that was stationed at NSW. To take up this appointment he sailed out again to NSW on the Speke as part of the Transport Board. He arrived in November 1808 with £800 of freight transport. In 1809 Porpoise visited Van Diemen's Land, carrying as a passenger Governor William Bligh, who had been deposed in the Rum Rebellion. When Bligh was deposed, Oxley denied he supported John Macarthur but his letters showed that he was close to him. In 1810, Oxley returned to England. During this period, Oxley sought the positions of Naval Officer and Surveyor-General. He retired from the Navy in 1811 and was briefly in an engagement to Elizabeth Macarthur the following year.

== Surveyor General ==
In 1812, Oxley travelled to Sydney as Surveyor-General of the Minstrel. Oxley's appointment was at the time of Lachlan Macquarie's Governorship. Macquarie encouraged exploration – he had sent George Evans to confirm the exploratory work of Wentworth, Blaxland and Lawson over the Blue Mountains, instigated the building of the road over the Blue Mountains in 1814–1815, and had travelled to Bathurst immediately William Cox had completed it. From there he had sent George Evans on an expedition of exploration up the Lachlan River in May 1815.

Now Macquarie wanted the Lachlan and Macquarie River explored thoroughly. Opening up of the new lands over the mountains had created enthusiasm for further discoveries about them and the Macquarie River. Mysteriously, the Macquarie and the Lachlan flowed westwards to the interior of the country and not easterly towards the coastline. Successively, in 1817 and 1818 Governor Macquarie appointed John Oxley in charge of two expeditions to investigate these rivers.

On the 1817 Lachlan expedition, Oxley was to come across marshy country and conclude this inland area was uninhabitable. If he had pressed on for two more days he would have reached the Murrumbidgee River. Oxley reported that, in his opinion, the Lachlan flowed into an extensive series of swamps, "which were, perhaps, the margin of a great inland sea." Similarly, the Macquarie expedition the following year in 1818 came to a halt on that river at the Macquarie Marshes in a good season for the marshes as the Macquarie was in flood replenishing these vital wetlands. Oxley tried hard to proceed through them but couldn't do so. He returned to the encampment of the rest of his party now convinced that these westward flowing rivers terminated in an inland sea, and he had been on the swampy edge of it.

Through Oxley, the theory of the Australian inland sea was fed and perpetuated.

=== Lachlan River expedition, 1817 ===
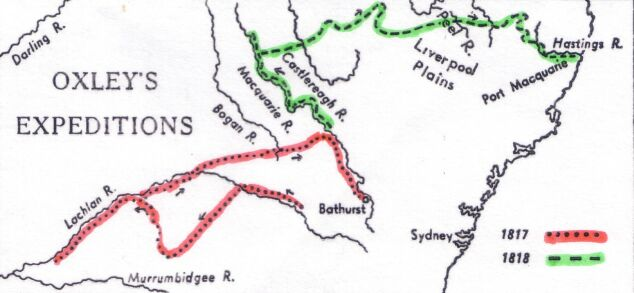
1817 and 1818 Expeditions of Oxley

In March 1817 John Oxley was instructed to take charge of an expedition to explore and survey the course of the Lachlan River. He left Sydney on 6 April 1817 with George Evans as second-in-command, and Allan Cunningham as a botanist. The previous year, Evans had accompanied Macquarie over the Blue Mountains to Bathurst on the celebratory completion of Cox's road, where Macquarie had directed him on an exploratory journey which resulted in Evans reaching and naming the Lachlan River west of Bathurst in May 1815. The party also included William Parr as a mineralogist and draftsman.

Oxley's party reached Bathurst after a week, where they were briefly detained by bad weather. On 25 April 1817, they reached the Lachlan River Depot which had been prepared for them (with provisions and supplies) in advance by a separate party under the direction of William Cox. From here, they commenced following its course. As the exploring party travelled westward the country surrounding the rising river was found to be increasingly inundated. On 12 May, west of the present township of Forbes, they found their progress impeded by an extensive marsh. They travelled down a northern branch of the river to Mount Mulguthery where they were forced to return up the river.

After retracing their route for a short distance they then proceeded in a south-westerly direction through Ungarie and past Weethalle, intending to travel overland to the southern Australian coastline. By the end of May, the party found themselves in a dry scrubby country northeast of Yenda where they ascended several peaks in the Cocoparra National Park. Shortage of water and the death of two horses forced Oxley's return, passing near Rankins Springs to the Lachlan River.

On 23 June the Lachlan River near Merrigal Bridge was reached: "we suddenly came upon the banks of the river… which we had quitted nearly five weeks before". They followed the course of the Lachlan River through Hillston and Booligal for a fortnight. The party encountered much-flooded country and reached a point five kilometres south-west of Booligal which was their last campsite. On 7 July Oxley proceeded another 16 km along the flooded river and recorded that "it was with infinite regret and pain that I was forced to conclude, that the interior of this vast country is a marsh and uninhabitable". Oxley resolved to turn back and after resting for two days the exploring party began to retrace their steps along the Lachlan River.

They left the Lachlan at Kiacatoo up-stream of the present site of Lake Cargelligo and crossed to the Bogan River and then across to the Wellington Valley on the upper waters of the Macquarie River, which they followed back to Bathurst (arriving on 29 August 1817). The Wellington Valley would later be made the site of a convict settlement mostly for convict 'specials'.

=== Macquarie River expedition, 1818 ===
Although disappointed by his Lachlan expedition, in not following the river all the way to its end, John Oxley took up Macquarie's next directive to explore the Macquarie River. He departed from Bathurst on 28 May 1818 with an exploration party that comprised Deputy Surveyor General George Evans, Oxley's friend Dr John Harris, a botanist named Charles Frazer, and twelve convict men. The names of the twelve convict men were later recorded by Governor Macquarie in his diary, upon the party's eventual return to Sydney. "The following are their Names: William Warner, Patrick Byrne, James Blake, George Simpson, James Williams, John Williams, Francis Lloyd, Barnard Butler, Thomas Ellis, John Dwyer, Richard Watts, Henry Shippey." He also noted that the first five men listed had also been with Oxley on the previous year's 1817 exploratory journey to the Lachlan.

They also took boats with them and nearly two dozen horses. The party would get upriver to the Macquarie Marshes, turn north-east to the Warrumbungle mountains crossing the Castlereagh River in the process, view the rich Liverpool Plains, come across the Peel River and the Hastings River to reach the NSW coast and the site of present-day Port Macquarie. These European sightings delivered a real boost to the NSW colony.

On 12 June 1818 Oxley was near the site that would become Dubbo. He wrote that he had passed that day 'over a very beautiful country, thinly wooded and apparently safe from the highest floods...'. they continued to follow the Macquarie River through land that became increasingly flat. On 27 June they spotted a small hill and named it Mt Harris in honour of John Harris accompanying him. On the same day the mountains in the distance to the east (now known by their Aboriginal name, the Warrumbungles) were named Arbuthnot's Ranges for the Rt Hon C. Arbuthnot of H.M. Treasury. Mt Harris is 54 km N-NW of present-day Warren.

They continued by boat and horses until they reached the Macquarie Marshes where it spread out through the reeds and Oxley was unable to locate the course of the river any further downstream. He wrote:

"But if an opinion may be permitted to be hazarded from actual appearances, mine is decidedly in favour of our being in the immediate vicinity of an inland sea, or lake, most probably a shoal one, and gradually filling up by numerous depositions from the high lands, left by waters which flow into it."

From here he retraced steps to Mt Harris, NW of present-day Warren, and camped from early July while he sent George Evans forward with a few men to scout a route to the north-east. On Evans' return, the expedition crossed the river that Oxley would name the Castlereagh, went towards the Warrumbungle Mountains, which he named at the time 'Arbuthnot's Range' and easterly through the Gooriananwa Gap From here they moved forward to come upon the rich soil of the Liverpool Plains.

On 26 August 1818 they climbed a hill and saw before them rich, fertile land (Peel River), near the present site of Tamworth. Continuing further east they crossed the Great Dividing Range passing by the Apsley Falls on 13 September 1818 which Oxley named the Bathurst Falls. He described it as "one of the most magnificent waterfalls we have seen".

Upon reaching the Hastings River the exploring party followed it to its mouth, discovering that it flowed into the sea at a spot which Oxley named Port Macquarie.

In his diary of 27 November 1818, Governor Macquarie listed the twelve men who accompanied Oxley and Evans on this expedition (see above). He wrote: "I inspected and spoke to the 12 Men who Accompanied Mr. Oxley on his last Expedition – and in his own presence returned them my thanks for their steady good and obedient Conduct on the Expedition; and being all Convicts I have promised to give them Conditional Pardons as a reward for their good behaviour."

=== Shoalhaven and Jervis Bay expedition, 1819 ===
Oxley and Assistant Surveyor-General James Meehan led two separate but concurrent expeditions, in late 1819. Oxley proceeded down the coast by sea to the Shoalhaven. Meehan went overland, starting from the Minnamurra River and meeting Oxley at the Shoalhaven. Oxley's report of good soils in the area increased interest in agricultural settlement around Gerringong and the Shoalhaven. Oxley's report of the western shore of Jervis Bay, was far less favourable. He stated, "We saw no place on which even a Cabbage might be planted with a prospect of success" and that "perhaps a more miserable sterile Country was never traversed by man".

=== Oxley's 1823 expedition to Brisbane River ===
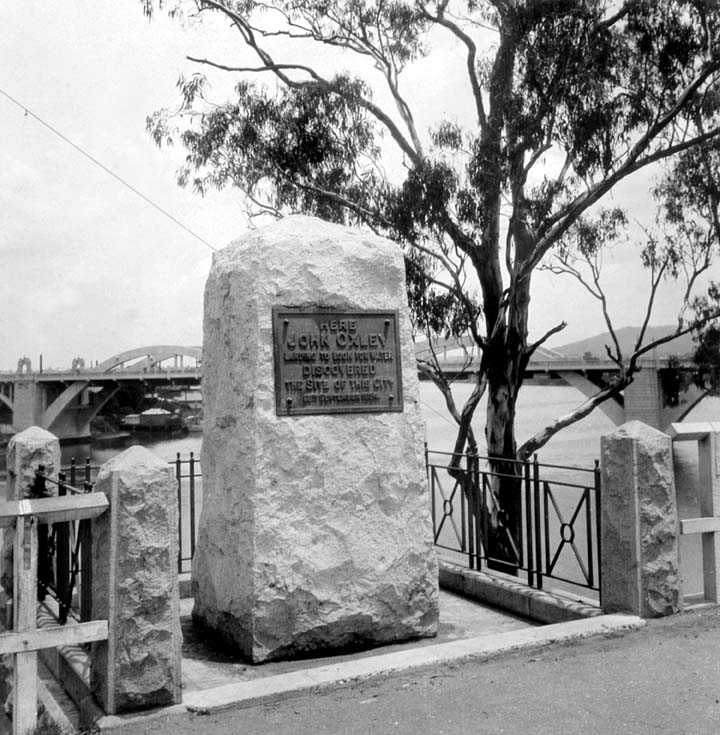
John Oxley Monument, North Quay, Brisbane

In 1823, Governor Brisbane sent Oxley north by boat in search of a site for an alternative penal settlement for the most difficult convicts. On this journey, he visited the Tweed River and valley and was deeply impressed, recording his impressions as follows: "A deep rich valley clothed with magnificent trees, the beautiful uniformity of which was only interrupted by the turns and windings of the river, which here and there appeared like small lakes. The background was Mt. Warning. The view was altogether beautiful beyond description. The scenery here exceeded anything I have previously seen in Australia." As Surveyor General, Oxley made a close examination of the Tweed River and Port Curtis, and sources connected that investigation, principally the manuscript journal kept by Oxley, and the published Narrative of John Uniack, who accompanied Oxley.

Oxley sailed northwards in the Mermaid to Port Curtis, surveying its waterways. Deciding not to continue to Port Bowen, he returned south and entered Moreton Bay, between Skirmish Point (Bribie Island) believed at the time to be a mainland peninsula, and Moreton Island. Here he came across two convict castaways; Cedar Getters, who were swept far out to sea whilst sailing to Five Islands (Illawarra) under the instruction of their employer; William Cox. They had been living with the Aboriginal people of Moreton Bay since being shipwrecked on Moreton Island, slowly making their way north believing they were still south of Sydney. With their assistance, Oxley was shown, and named, the Brisbane River. He recommend this place for the site of the convict settlement, which became Moreton Bay, and later the city of Brisbane. A monument was built at North Quay in 1924 to commemorate the site of his landing in Brisbane.

In 1824 Oxley, accompanied by Allan Cunningham returned to the Brisbane River and, travelling further up, then located the Bremer River.

== Personal life ==
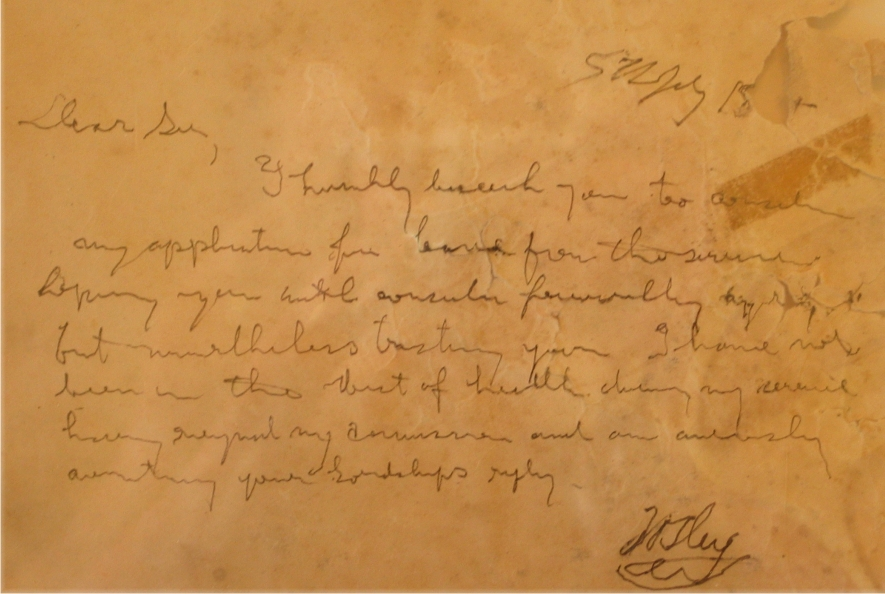
Request for leave due to illness dated 5 July 1824

Oxley was a Protestant and subscribed to both the Anglican Church and Presbyterian Church where he was one of the congregation.

Governor Lachlan Macquarie granted Oxley 600 acres (240 ha) near Camden in 1810, which he increased to 1,000 acres (400 ha) in 1815. Oxley named this property Kirkham after his birthplace and raised and bred sheep there. He was one of five members of the original 1824 New South Wales Legislative Council.

Oxley had three daughters out of wedlock with two women, before he married a third woman. Two of these daughters were with Charlotte Thorpe and born before his inland expeditions: Jeanette b. 1813 who died in 1875 and is buried in the historic cemetery at South Head, and Frances b. 1815 who married William Waugh and is buried in Tenterfield. He had another daughter, Louisa b. 1821, with Elizabeth Marmon. This child drowned (aged 3) in early December 1824 in a well opposite Oxley's house in Macquarie Street, Sydney. The newspaper report was as follows:

"An Inquest was held on Saturday last, on the body of Louisa Oxley, a lovely infant of four years old, that fell into a well 100 feet deep, close under the Hyde Park Barrack wall, and was drowned before aid could be afforded; to which effect a Verdict was returned. The criminality of suffering a well to be so publicly exposed, calls forth appropriate indignation."

In October 1821, Oxley married Emma Norton (1798–1885) at St Philip's Anglican Church. Emma was the youngest sister of the solicitor James Norton and had followed him out to New South Wales from Sussex after he had established himself as an attorney in the colony. Oxley and Emma Norton had a daughter and two sons. The elder, John Norton Oxley became a Member of the Legislative Assembly, representing the Western Division of Camden, in the first Parliament after the establishment of responsible government in 1856. He sponsored the Broad Gauge Act which encouraged the use of wagons with broad wheels instead of narrow-tired drays in order to cause less wear on public roads; this measure made him unpopular with the farmers and carriers in his electorate and he lost his seat. The younger son, Henry Oxley, also became a Member of the Legislative Assembly, representing the Electoral district of Camden between 1859 and 1860.

Oxley suffered with illness throughout his service, caused by the difficulties of his expeditions. He finally succumbed to his illness and died at age 44 on 25 May 1828 at his Kirkham property, Kirkham, New South Wales, outside Camden. The funeral service was held at St James Anglican Church and attended by many prominent dignitaries. An obituary notice was published in the Government Gazette of 27 May 27, 1828.

== Legacy ==
- A statue of Oxley (c.1891), in a niche on the Bridge Street facade of the Department of Lands building, in Sydney.
- To celebrate the centenary of Oxley's discovery of Brisbane, a statue was erected in his honour in 1924.
- John Oxley Memorial, was erected in Redcliffe, Queensland in 1932
- In 1976, Oxley was honoured on a postage stamp bearing his portrait issued by Australia Post.
- In 2012 a metal silhouette of Oxley was unveiled in Kirkham.
- Oxley's Memorial, an anchor from survey ship HMS Sealark (1903), next to the Tamworth road at Hallsville, New South Wales, marking the route Oxley took in 1818. Erected 1926.
- John Oxley Landing Memorial erected on 3 December 1983 in Newstead House Park, Newstead, Queensland

Places and miscellaneous items bearing his name include:

- Electoral districts in New South Wales and Queensland including:
  - the Division of Oxley, a federal electorate located in Queensland
  - the Electoral district of Oxley, a state electorate located in New South Wales
  - the Electoral district of Oxley, a former state electorate located in Queensland
- Oxley, a suburb in the Australian Capital Territory
- Oxley, a suburb in Queensland
- Oxley Road, a main road in the southern suburbs in Brisbane
- Oxley Avenue, a street on Russell Island
- Oxley College (Burradoo), New South Wales
- John Oxley Drive, a road in Frenchs Forest
- John Oxley Library, part of the State Library of Queensland, is dedicated to preserving and making available Queensland's documentary history
  - John Oxley Library Fellowship, worth A$20,000
  - John Oxley Memory Award, awarded by the State Library of Queensland
  - John Oxley papers, a collection of letters mostly from John to his wife Emma
- John Oxley Memorial Hospital (now demolished), in Wacol, Queensland
- John Oxley Reserve, Murrumba Downs, Queensland, a 10-hectare (25-acre) nature reserve with sporting fields, playground and a nature walk leading to the Pine River.
- John Oxley Village, an on-campus residence of the Charles Sturt University Bathurst campus, colloquially known as "JOV" to students, and birthplace of the Village Fair music festival.
- John Oxley Youth Detention Centre
- Oxley, a town in New South Wales
- Oxley Street in Townsville, Queensland
- Oxley Creek, a creek in Queensland
- Oxley High School in Tamworth
- Oxley Avenue a main parade in Redcliffe, Queensland a peninsula he visited on his journey through the waters of Moreton Bay
- Oxley Highway, in New South Wales
- Oxley Island, located on the north coast of New South Wales
- Oxley Park and Oxley Vale, both suburbs in New South Wales
- Oxley's Plains, in north-east Victoria, on which the Oxley township grew, named by Hume and Hovell during their exploration from the Yass Plains to Port Phillip in 1824
- Oxley Wild Rivers National Park
- A Junee Public School house
- A Woonona Public School house
- Oxley River, located in the Far North Coast of NSW. Oxley river feeds into the Tweed River, at Byangum, near Murwillumbah NSW.

Ships:

- SS John Oxley, a steamship built in 1927 for the Queensland State Government, and since 1970 a vessel of the Sydney Heritage Fleet.
- HMAS Oxley, an Odin class submarine launched in 1926 and transferred to the Royal Navy in 1931, and lost in 1939.
- HMAS Oxley (S 57), an Oberon class submarine launched in 1965, decommissioned in 1992. The bow section of HMAS Oxley is on display outside the Western Australian Maritime Museum.

Preceded by Charles Grimes	Surveyor General of New South Wales; 1812–1828	Succeeded by Thomas Mitchell
