= George V Avenue =

George V Avenue may refer to:

- King George V Avenue of Memorial English Oaks, New South Wales, Australia
- Avenue George V, Paris, France

== See also ==
- George V
