= South Tamworth, New South Wales =

South Tamworth
- Suburb
- Interactive map of South Tamworth
- Coordinates: 31°06′40″S 150°54′49″E
- Country: Australia
- State: New South Wales
- City: Tamworth
- LGA: Tamworth Regional Council

Government
  - State electorate: Tamworth
  - Federal division: New England

Population
  - Total: 6,565 (2016 census)
- Postcode: 2340
Suburbs around South Tamworth
Taminda	West Tamworth
	South Tamworth
	Hillvue	Calala

South Tamworth is a suburb of Tamworth, New South Wales, Australia and is situated south from the cities central business district. It is a largely residential suburb and is a mixture of both new housing estates and well established estates. Southgate Shopping Centre, Robert Street Shopping Centre, Chaffey Park and Hyman Park are all located in South Tamworth.

== Schools ==
- South Tamworth Public School
- Tamworth High School
- Saint Edwards Primary School
- Bullimbal School
