= North Tamworth, New South Wales =

Coordinates: 31°04′41″S 150°55′34″E

North Tamworth
- Suburb
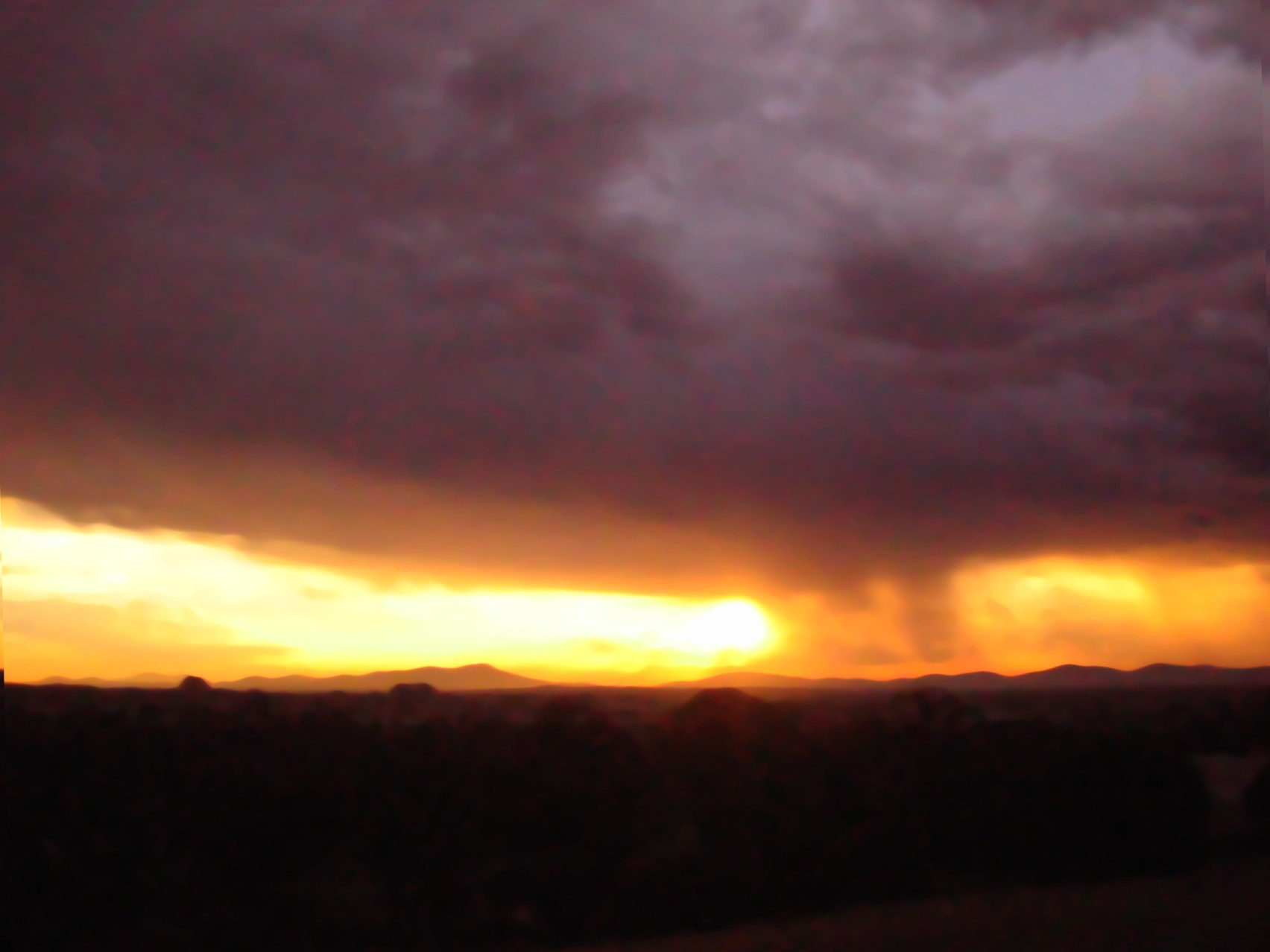
- North Tamworth Sunset
- Interactive map of North Tamworth
- Country: Australia
- State: New South Wales
- City: Tamworth
- LGA: Tamworth Regional Council

Government
  - State electorate: Tamworth
  - Federal division: New England

Population
  - Total: 5,141 (2016 census)
- Postcode: 2340
Suburbs around North Tamworth
Hallsville	Moores Creek	Daruka
Oxley Vale	North Tamworth	East Tamworth
Taminda	West Tamworth	Tamworth Central Business District

North Tamworth is a suburb of Tamworth, New South Wales, Australia, in the city's north. It is on the northerly side of the Peel River between the suburbs of East Tamworth and Oxley Vale. North of North Tamworth are the satellite suburbs Hills Plain, and Moore Creek. The Tamworth Base Hospital, Tamara Private Hospital, and many medical professionals' clinics. The suburb contains Northgate Shopping Centre and many sporting fields.

== History ==
Settlement of the area dates from the 1830s when squatters began to settle along the Peel River. Growth was minimal until the 1880s, aided by the construction of the railway line. Significant development occurred in the post-war years, particularly during the 1960s and 1970s. The population has been relatively stable since the early 1990s, a result of some new dwellings being added to the area, but a decline in the average number of persons living in each dwelling.

== Locality ==
North Tamworth is bounded by Browns Lane in the north, the locality of Moore Creek in the east, the locality of East Tamworth, Daruka Road, Janison Street, Darling Street, Main North railway line and the Peel River in the south and the locality of Oxley Vale in the west.

== Schools ==
- Oxley High School
- Tamworth TAFE
- McCarthy Catholic College

== Sporting Teams and Grounds ==
North Tamworth is the home four of Tamworth's football teams: Tamworth Rugby Union Sporting Club play at Rugby Park; the North Tamworth Bears Rugby League Club and Oxley Vale Attunga Football Club play at Jack Woolaston Oval; and the North Companions Football Club play at Riverside Park.

=== Rivalries ===
There is a rich tradition of rivalries in Rugby league and Rugby Union between North Tamworth and West Tamworth as the suburbs' football teams represent the northern and western suburbs of Tamworth respectively, and geographically different sides of the Peel River. In rugby league this rivalry is between the North Tamworth Bears and the West Tamworth Lions, with their clash drawing large crowds each year. In rugby union this rivalry is between the Tamworth Magpies and the Pirates rugby club, with their clash each year also drawing large crowds.
