= Westdale =

Westdale may refer to:

== Australia ==
- Westdale, New South Wales, a suburb of Tamworth, New South Wales
- West Dale, Western Australia

== Canada ==
- Westdale, Ontario, a residential neighbourhood in Hamilton
  - Westdale Secondary School, a high school
- Ancaster—Dundas—Flamborough—Westdale, a federal and provincial electoral district in Ontario

== United States ==
- Westdale, Los Angeles, California, a neighborhood in Los Angeles
- Westdale, Texas, a census-designated place in Jim Wells County
- Westdale Mall, an enclosed shopping mall in Cedar Rapids, Iowa
