= Tintinhull, New South Wales =

Coordinates: 31°04′19″S 151°00′13″E

Tintinhull
- Suburb
- Interactive map of Tintinhull
- Country: Australia
- State: New South Wales
- City: Tamworth
- LGA: Tamworth Regional Council

Government
  - State electorate: Tamworth,
  - Federal division: New England

Population
  - Total: 433 (SAL 2021)
- Postcode: 2340

Tintinhull is a hamlet about 10 kilometres east of Tamworth, New South Wales, Australia. It is situated between Nemingha and Kootingal, and lies on the New England Highway. The locality is 466 km from Sydney, on the Main Northern railway line which opened in 1885 and closed in December 1971.

Preceding station	Former services	Following station
Kootingal towards Wallangarra	Main Northern Line	Nemingha towards Sydney
