= Belgamba railway station =

Former railway station in New South Wales, Australia

Belgamba

General information
- Location: Werris Creek Road, Duri; New South Wales; Australia
- Coordinates: 31°15′54″S 150°46′56″E
- Operator: Department of Railways
- Line: Main North
- Distance: 430.157 km (267.287 mi) from Central
- Platforms: 1 (1 side)
- Tracks: 1

Construction
- Structure type: Ground

Other information
- Status: Demolished

History
- Opened: 10 October 1937 (88 years ago)
- Closed: 16 October 1971 (54 years ago)

Services
Preceding station	Former services	Following station
Duri towards Wallangarra	Main Northern Line	Currabubula towards Sydney
Location

Belgamba railway station was a regional railway station located on the Main North line, serving the New England village of Duri. The station was open between 1937 and 1971.
