= Tamworth Public School =

Coordinates: 31°05′S 150°56′E

- East Tamworth, New South Wales, Australia tamworth, australia, nsw

Information
- School type: Public primary school
- Established: 1855
- Principal: john Ireland
- Enrolment: 900
- Campus: Residential
- Colours: Blue and gold
- Website: https://tamworth-p.schools.nsw.gov.au/

Tamworth Public School is situated in East Tamworth, New South Wales, Australia. Over 900 students attend the primary school, and it is the oldest school in Tamworth, being established in 1855. The school's mottos are Aim High and Care, Courtesy and Consideration.

== See also ==
- List of Government schools in New South Wales
- Schools in Tamworth, New South Wales
