= Tamworth Peel Barracks =

- Location within New South Wales Location within Australia
- 31°05′12″S 150°55′38″E
- Location: 214 Peel Street, Tamworth, Tamworth Regional Council, New South Wales, Australia

History
- Built: 1896
- Built for: Municipality of Tamworth

Site notes
- Owner: Tamworth Regional Council

New South Wales Heritage Register
- Official name: Tamworth Peel Barracks
- Type: State heritage (built)
- Designated: 2 April 1999
- Reference no.: 550
- Type: historic site

The Tamworth Peel Barracks is a heritage-listed historic site located at 214 Peel Street, Tamworth, Tamworth Regional Council, New South Wales, Australia. The property is owned by Tamworth Regional Council and was added to the New South Wales State Heritage Register on 2 April 1999.

== History ==
The town's first government school was established on this site in 1855.

Built in 1896 at a cost of A£2,000 as the former Tamworth Town Hall.

On 22 September 1939 the building became a recruiting depot for the Army.

== Description ==
The structure is a single storey Flemish bond face brick building with white rendered mouldings. The heavily moulded Darling Street facade has tuckpointed brick with five arches forming a symmetrical arcade. The central portico is surmounted by a pediment on Corinthian pilasters. There are masonry balustrades to the verandah and at parapet level, the parapet being broken by a large central pediment. The front door is two leaved, four panelled and half glazed with a fanlight, fluted mullions and sidelights. The windows are surmounted by heavily decorated mouldings. The southern facade is less decorative and features a simple parapet, string courses and a square porch with keystone arches. The northern wing is the fully rendered former Town Hall with pediment, pilasters and the curtilage is the fenced property boundary.

== See also ==
- Military history of Australia
