= HMS Sealark (1903) =

British steam-assisted sailing survey vessel

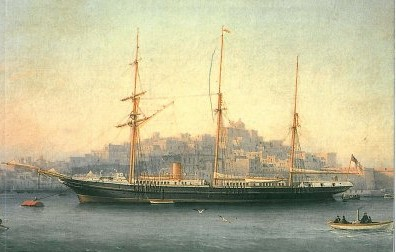
- Wanderer in 1880

History

United Kingdom, Italy
- Name: Wanderer
- Builder: Robert Steel & Co, Greenock
- Yard number: 180
- Launched: 12 December 1878
- Renamed: Vagus (1888), Consuelo (1900)
- Fate: Sold 1903

United Kingdom
- Name: HMS Investigator
- Acquired: By purchase 1903
- Decommissioned: 1914
- Renamed: HMS Sealark (1904)

Australia
- Name: Sealark III
- Acquired: 1919
- Renamed: Norwest (c1922)
- Fate: Seized 1924 for debt and converted into a hulk

General characteristics
- Tonnage: 900 tons
- Length: 185 ft 6 in (56.54 m)
- Beam: 29 ft (8.8 m)
- Propulsion: Sail; steam auxiliary
- Armament: 1 × 3-pounder QF gun

HMS Sealark was a Royal Navy vessel used primarily for hydrographic survey work. She was originally a luxurious private auxiliary steam yacht for a number of wealthy owners and in 1903 was acquired by the Royal Navy, serving until 1914. She was sold to James Patrick Steamships Ltd and converted to a merchant ship for the Australian coast and finally hulked in 1924.

== History ==
Built by Robert Steele and Co, Greenock in 1878 for Charles Joseph Lambert as a private yacht named Wanderer and described as "the most luxurious private steam yacht ever built". She was registered with the Royal Yacht Squadron and became known as RYS Wanderer, based at Cowes, Isle of Wight.

On her shake-down cruise in the Bay of Biscay, September 1879, she was dismasted. The crew managed to cut away the broken rigging and she reached Falmouth under her own power. The high pressure steam engines also proved to be so problematic that they were replaced before she went into service with the Lambert family. During the repair works, additional accommodation was added in the form of poop decks fore and aft.

In 1880, Lambert, with his family undertook a 2-year world cruise on board, covering almost 49,000 miles and published an account on their return titled The Voyage of the "Wanderer". In 1888 after a number of cruises around the world, she was sold to the Principe di Torlonia and renamed Vagus. In 1896 she returned to the British register at Cowes, and then, had a series of owners including in 1900 the American millionaire William Kissam Vanderbilt who renamed her Consuelo, his daughter's name. (Note: This information conflicts with contemporary sources - see section Conflicting source data,) By 1903 Consuelo was still registered at Cowes, but now owned by the Earl of Crawford.

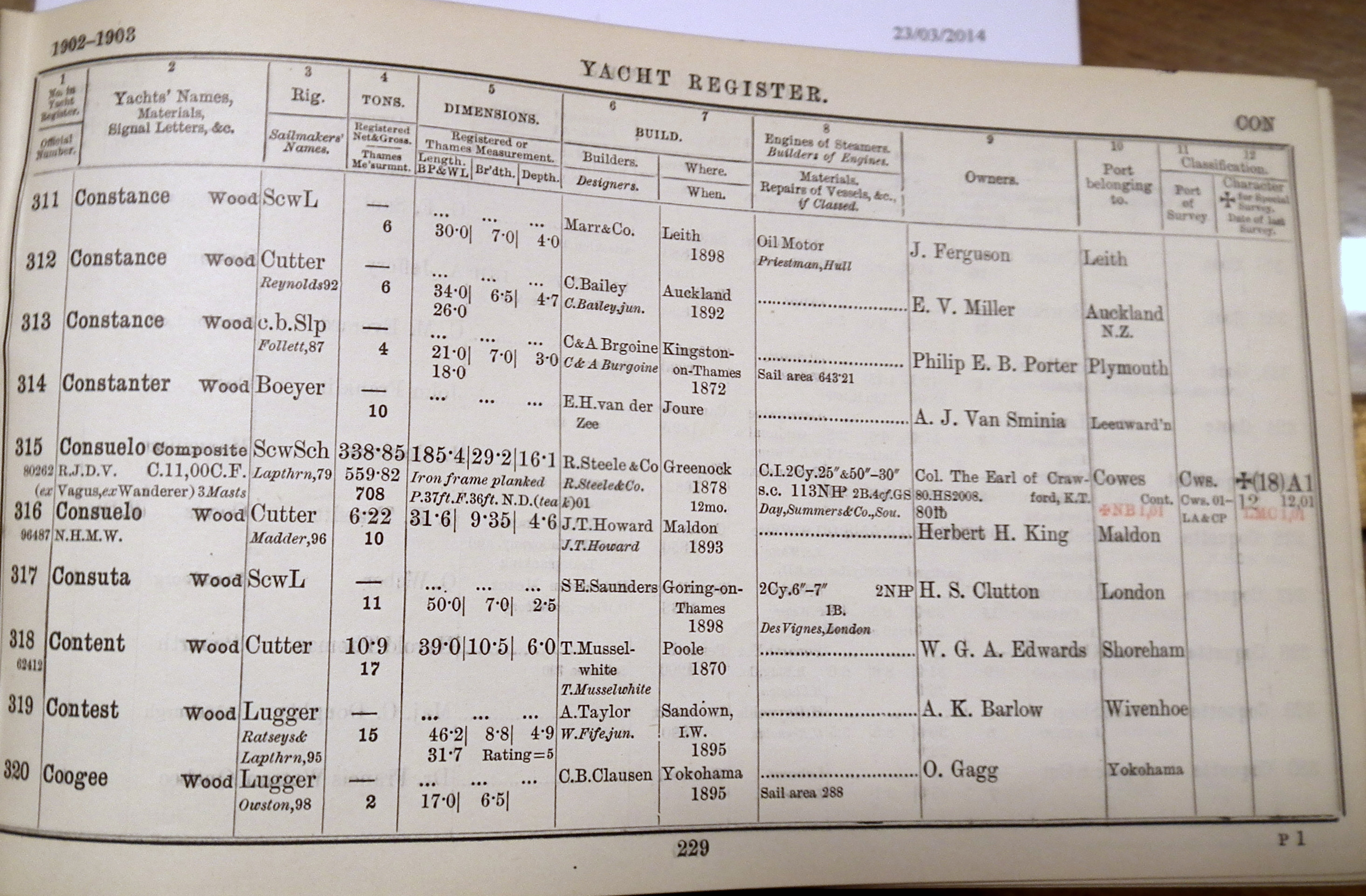
Lloyd's yacht register 1902–1903 Consuelo (ex Wanderer, ex Vagus). Owned by Earl of Crawford.

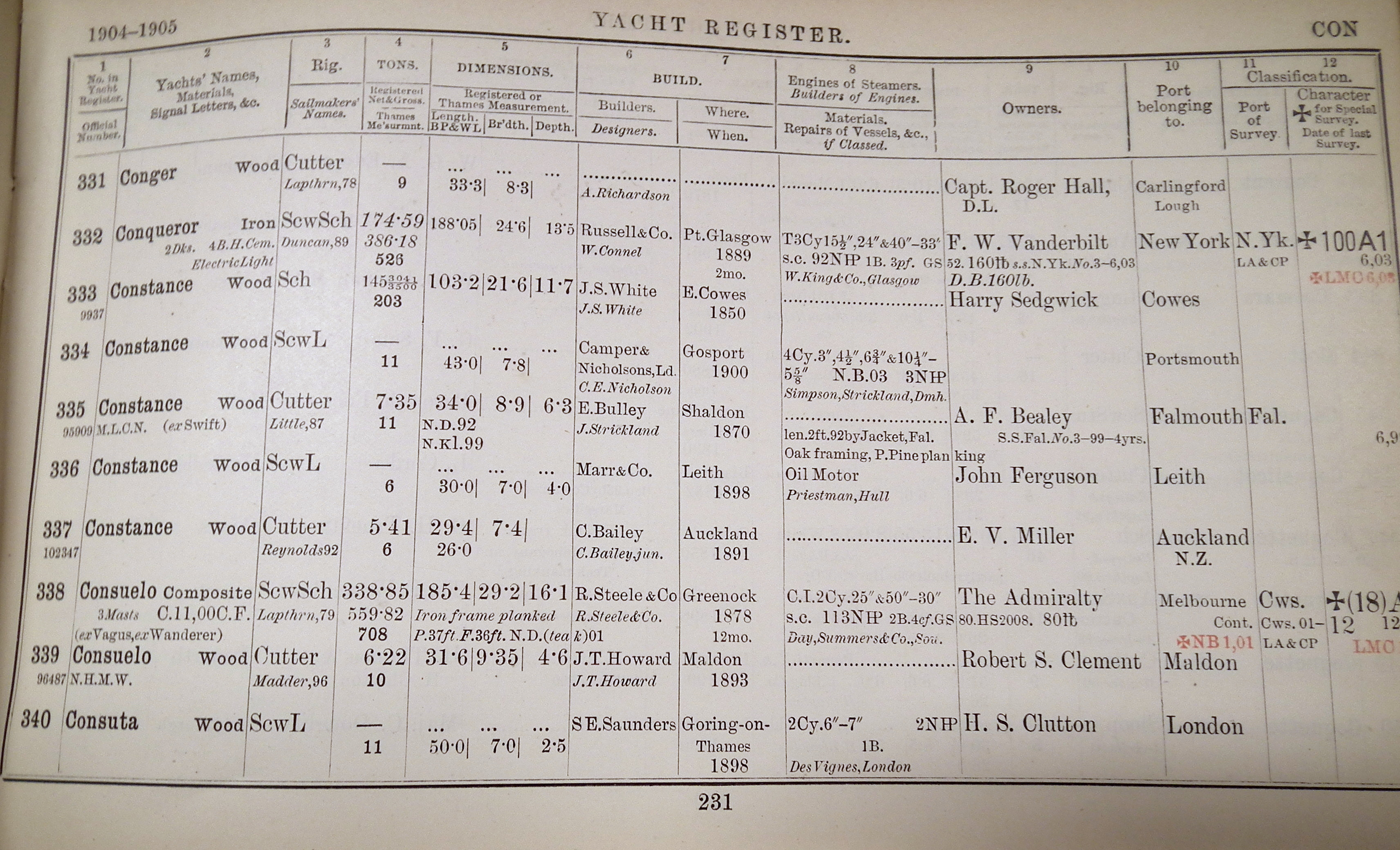
Lloyd's yacht register 1904–1905 Consuelo (ex Wanderer, ex Vagus). Owned by Admiralty

In 1903, Consuelo was purchased by the Admiralty and initially commissioned as HMS Investigator. In 1904 after refitting as a survey vessel, at a cost of £20,000, she was renamed HMS Sealark and sailed from Portsmouth in September 1904 to serve on the China Station. In 1910, she sailed from Penang for the Australia Station. She undertook various hydrographic surveys around Australia and the South Pacific between 1910 and 1914. With the beginning of World War I, and the threat of German Empire expansion in the South Pacific, she sailed to Suva, Fiji with a cargo of coastal guns, for a gun emplacement on a hill in Suva.

After returning from Fiji via New Zealand to Sydney, she was paid off in 1914. In 1919, Australian shipowner Captain J. H. Patrick purchased her for £2500, converted her into a merchant ship at a cost of £15,000, initially renaming her Sealark III, and then Norwest. She plied the interstate trade for James Patrick Steamships Ltd until 1924, when the English, Scottish and Australian Bank seized her to repay debts owed. After James Patrick Steamships Ltd failed, the bank sold her to William Waugh Ltd., Balmain, Sydney for about £500. William Waugh dismantled her and converted her into a hulk.

== Figurehead ==
The figurehead was presented to the Royal Australian Navy and was mounted at the Dockyard on Garden Island.

== Anchor ==
Located in Hallsville, New South Wales, next to the main road between Tamworth and Manilla, is the anchor from HMS Sealark. Known as the Oxley Memorial, as it is dedicated to the first Surveyor General of New South Wales, John Oxley, who took this route in 1818. The plaque reads that it was "donated by the Naval Board Melbourne". A contemporaneous newspaper article said that "the anchor, which has been on Garden Island since the Sealark went out of commission, was landed at man-o'-war steps and conveyed to Darling Harbour railway station for transport to Tamworth". The memorial was erected in 1926.

== Conflicting source data ==
John Bastock’s book Ships on the Australian Station is at odds with other reference sources by stating that HMS Sealark was originally constructed in 1887 by Gourley Bros & Co of Dundee, and attributing ownership of Consuelo, between 1900 and 1903, to W. K. Vanderbilt. Contemporary records, including the Lloyd's yacht registers from 1900 to 1904 and The Mercantile Navy List and Maritime Directories of the same period, confirm that Sealark was built by Robert Steele and Co. in 1878 as Wanderer, and the registered owners between 1900 and 1903 were Sir Richard Henry Williams-Bulkeley and the Earl of Crawford, not Vanderbilt.
