= Calrossy Anglican School =

Location
- East Tamworth, New South Wales; Australia; 31°4′58″S 150°56′15″E

Information
- Type: Independent, day and boarding K–12, Co-education
- Motto: Learn Grow Serve
- Denomination: Anglican
- Established: 1919
- Principal: Mark Lewis
- Staff: 270
- Enrolment: ~1050 (K–12)
- Colours: Red, navy and white
- Slogan: Learn Grow Serve
- Website: www.calrossy.nsw.edu.au

The Calrossy Anglican School (Calrossy) is an independent, Anglican, day and boarding school for boys and girls and incorporates a primary and preschool. Calrossy is located in East Tamworth, a suburb of Tamworth, a city in the New England region of New South Wales, Australia.

Established in 1919, the school has a non-selective enrolment policy, and caters for 470 secondary girls and 155 secondary boys and 375 primary students. With 180 boarders, Calrossy has one of the largest boarding enrolments among New South Wales boarding schools. In 2006, Calrossy joined with William Cowper Anglican Boys High School and William Cowper Primary School, to create the Calrossy Anglican School. The school now incorporates a secondary day and boarding school for girls (Calrossy), a secondary day and boarding school for boys, a co-educational prep and primary school, and a co-educational preschool, with total enrolments of 1000.

The school is affiliated with the Junior School Heads Association of Australia (JSHAA), the Australian Boarding Schools' Association (ABSA), the Alliance of Girls' Schools Australasia (AGSA), and is an affiliate member of the Association of Heads of Independent Girls' Schools (AHIGS). Calrossy is administered by the Anglican Diocese of Armidale.

== History ==
The school was named as the Tamworth Church of England Girls' School (TCEGS), by a group of parishioners from St John's Parish Church, Tamworth, led by the Vicar, Canon Rupert Fairbrother with seventeen foundation students. The school occupied a site close to the church in East Tamworth. Lessons were held in the church hall, and the boarding house was an old building on the corner of Brisbane and Carthage Streets.

The school moved to its present site in Brisbane Street in 1923, to a property formerly owned by John Patterson. His home, the centrepiece of the new school, was named 'Calrossy' after his family property in Scotland. The school adopted the name in 1969.

TCEGS remained a parish school until 1936, when it was taken over by the Diocese of Armidale and administered in a similar way to the diocese's other schools, The Armidale School and the New England Girls' School.

William Cowper Anglican Secondary Boys' School, Tamworth NSW

William Cowper Anglican (Primary) School opened, with Ann Brown as Principal in 1999 on the grounds of Calrossy where the secondary boys' school also started in 2001.

William Cowper Anglican Secondary Boys' School was opened in 2001. It was in existence from 2001–2005 before amalgamating with the girls school, Calrossy Anglican School to become Tamworth Anglican College (2006–2007). In 2008 the school changed its name to Calrossy Anglican School. The primary school and the secondary boys' school moved to the William Cowper Campus on Moore Creek Road in 2002.

The inaugural Principal of William Cowper Anglican Secondary Boys' School was Mr Nicholas Brown, who resigned at the end of Term 1, 2001. Mr Graham Payne acted as Master in Charge of the school until the appointment of Mr Stephen Laurence in August 2001. Mr Stephen Laurence remained in this position until April 2005. Mr Joseph Goldsworthy took on the role of Acting Head of William Cowper Anglican Secondary Boys' School until the amalgamation and then filled the role of Head of Secondary Boys until his retirement in 2016.

In 2006, Calrossy joined with William Cowper Anglican Boys High School and William Cowper Primary School, to create the Tamworth Anglican College (TAC), subsequently the school's name was changed to Tamworth Anglican College – Calrossy Campus. The amalgamation created a Pre-school to Year 12 with school, with a co-educational primary school and two single-sex high schools (Secondary Girls and Secondary Boys). Each sub-school has retained its own crest and traditions. In 2007, the name "Tamworth Anglican College" was changed to Calrossy Anglican School. The senior school for girls is now therefore named Calrossy Anglican School – Brisbane Street Campus.

== Principals ==
Period	Details
1919–1921	Matilda Stockfeld
1921	Florence Suiter
1922–1925	Katharine Bedford
1926	Muriel Hammond
1926	Sidney Warren
1927–1929	Annie Dannevig
1930–1940	Annie Parr
1941–1951	Gwendoline Horton
1951	Rita Allen (Acting)
1952–1961	Audrie Stafford Smith
1961–1968	Winifred Wetherall
1968–1976	Frances Stacey
1976–1988	Peter Smart
1989–2001	Graham Hilder
1999–2006 (William Cowper Anglican School Primary)	Ann Brown
2001–2005 (William Cowper Anglican School Boys)	Stephen Laurence
2001–2016	Elisabeth Jackson
2016–2025	David Smith
2026–present	Mark Lewis

== Curriculum ==
Calrossy Anglican School is registered and accredited with the New South Wales Board of Studies, and therefore follows the mandated curriculum for all years. The school offers core and elective subjects designed to prepare students for a range of opportunities in tertiary studies and career pathways.

Students in Years 11 and 12 may follow different Higher School Certificate (HSC) pathways, and complete vocational courses at TAFE or at school. Students may also undertake school-based traineeships, linking HSC studies with workplace developed competencies. Current subject choices include Agriculture, Agricultural Technology, Modern and Ancient History, Australian History, Geography, Civics and Citizenship, Biology, Chemistry, Physics, Business Studies, Christian Studies, Commerce, Design and Technology, Drama, Earth Sciences, Economics, English, Food Technology, French, Hospitality, Information and Software Technology and Design, Japanese, Music, Personal Development, Health and Physical Education (PDHPE), Photography, Society and Culture, Studies in Religion, Technology, Textiles Technology, Textiles and Design and Visual Arts.

Extra-curriculum activities include music groups, sporting teams, public speaking, debating and drama.

=== Sport ===
Calrossy offers sports, from beginners to advanced level, and offers pathways into professional sporting accolades. The school participates in local community sporting associations, where competition takes place throughout the week outside school hours.

Calrossy is an affiliate member of the Hunter Region Independent Schools group which provides a sporting pathway to state and national levels as part of the Combined Independent School Sporting Association. There is an opportunity for students to represent HRIS and AICES in hockey, netball, waterpolo, swimming, athletics, cross-country, tennis and tennis. Other sports available include touch football, basketball, soccer, equestrian and softball.

Calrossy holds annual inter-house competitions in swimming and athletics, and a Sports Day involving a range of sports in term three.

== Academic Results ==
Calrossy has had stable academic results over the years with the exception of a few students performing extraordinarily well including Larissa Smyth in 2023 who achieved an ATAR of 99.90, the schools highest ever and Ella Ward who achieved first in the state for Primary Industries.

== Controversies ==
=== "Common Ground" Survey ===
In 2025, Calrossy Anglican School faced backlash from parents after administering a survey to Year 7 students (as young as 12 years old) as part of the "Common Ground" project, run by the Foundation for Positive Masculinity. Parents expressed outrage over inappropriate questions regarding students' social lives, domestic violence, and sexuality, including statements such as "a real man should have as many sexual partners as he can".

Principal David Smith apologised, explaining staff had not reviewed the survey beforehand and that trusting the independent company to verify age appropriateness was an error. While the school pulled out of completing the survey component, some parents demanded the school completely withdraw from the Common Ground project, arguing that the controversial program had broken their trust.

=== Fair Work Commission ===
In 2026, Calrossy Anglican School faced Fair Work Commission proceedings following the departure of Reverend Samuel Anderson. Rev. Anderson resigned on 30 April 2026 (effective 26 June 2026) after an "off-the-record" discussion with Principal Mark Lewis regarding a show-cause letter tied to a March 2026 child safety incident. He chose to resign to protect his future employment prospectives in schools.

On 21 August 2026, Rev. Anderson lodged a late unfair dismissal application with the FWC after researching forced dismissal using ChatGPT on 1 August 2026.

On 15 October 2026, Commissioner McKinnon dismissed the application, ruling that the 35 day filing delay lacked "exceptional circumstances". The Commission found that Rev. Anderson had resigned freely to avoid disciplinary action and that ignorance of the law, including his reliance on ChatGPT and misunderstandings of statutory deadlines, did not justify extending the time limit.

== Fees ==
Calrossy is the most expensive school in Tamworth with annual fees starting at $7,700 for kindergarten to $23,430 for year 12. The fees for boarding in year 12 in 2026 are over $50,000. Calrossy offers bursaries and sibling discounts.

== Notable alumnae ==
Alumnae of Calrossy were previously known as Old Girls and were part of the school's alumni association, the Old Girls' Union (OGU). Given the amalgamation with William Cowper Anglican School in 2005, the group has been renamed Calrossy alumni association and it incorporates ex-students from each of the schools that were combined to form Calrossy.

Some notable Calrossy Old Girls include:

Academic

- Bronwyn Davies – Professor of Education at the University of Western Sydney; author

Media, entertainment and the arts

- Belinda Giblin – actress
- Jennifer Hoy – First Violin with the Sydney Symphony

== See also ==
- List of non-government schools in New South Wales
- List of boarding schools
- Schools in Tamworth, New South Wales
