= Duri, New South Wales =

Duri
- Town
- Coordinates: 31°12′55″S 150°49′04″E
- Country: Australia
- State: New South Wales
- LGA: Tamworth Regional Council
- Location: 388 km (241 mi) NW of Sydney; 16 km (9.9 mi) SW of Tamworth

Government
  - State electorate: Tamworth
  - Federal division: New England

Population
  - Total: 463 (2021 census)
- Postcode: 2344

Duri is a village south of Tamworth in the New England region of New South Wales, Australia. It lies on the Werris Creek Road and the Main North railway line. At the 2021 census, Duri had a population of 463.

A railway station was located there between 1879 and 1985. There is now only a Public School named Duri Public School, a post office and a public playground.

== Transport ==
Tamworth Buslines operates a bus service between Duri, Quirindi and Tamworth.

Preceding station	Former services	Following station
Warral towards Wallangarra	Main Northern Line	Belgamba towards Sydney
