= King George V Avenue of Memorial English Oaks =

Historic road in New South Wales, Australia

- Location within New South Wales Location within Australia
- 31°06′27″S 150°56′40″E
- Location: King George V Memorial Avenue (East), Tamworth, Tamworth Regional Council, New South Wales, Australia

History
- Built: 1936

Site notes
- Architect(s): Tamworth Council and Community

New South Wales Heritage Register
- Official name: King George V Avenue of Memorial English Oaks; Lower Nemingha Road
- Type: State heritage (landscape)
- Designated: 12 March 2014
- Reference no.: 1922
- Type: Tree groups – avenue of
- Category: Parks, Gardens and Trees
- Builders: Tamworth Progress Association; Tamworh Rotary; Tamworth Community and Council

The King George V Avenue of Memorial English Oaks is a heritage-listed memorial avenue at King George V Memorial Avenue (East), Tamworth, Tamworth Regional Council, New South Wales, Australia. It was designed by Tamworth Council and Community and built during 1936 by Tamworth Progress Association, Tamworh Rotary, Tamworth Community and Council. It is also known as Lower Nemingha Road. It was added to the New South Wales State Heritage Register on 12 March 2014.

== History ==
=== Establishment ===
The history of the avenue was found amongst various newspaper articles on microfiche (dating from 1936) and historical publications held at the Tamworth Regional library. Further articles were supplied from members of the public.

On 29 February 1936 at the request of the townspeople, the Mayor of Tamworth convened the first public meeting to decide on a memorial to King George V. The idea to establish a living memorial to the late king by planting an avenue of English oak trees was discussed and a memorial avenue was thought to be a fitting tribute to the much loved king as he had been a lover of trees. It was also thought that the avenue should be of English oaks which, even though they are slow growing, they live to a great age, were beautiful trees and also symbolic of the link to England. Oak trees were also used as a symbol of honour for the English monarchy.

Originally it was planned for the avenue to run from town along the Upper Nemingha Road (now the New England Highway), across the Two Mile Bridge over the Peel River, back along the Lower Nemingha Road (now King George V Memorial Avenue) and into town over the river via the Paradise Bridge.

It was estimated that 318 trees would be required and the cost was going to be A£300. This was felt to be an amount that was well within the means of the community of Tamworth. The population of Tamworth in 1936 was 11,000 and the committee felt that the cost of 15 shillings per tree was small and that perhaps school children and other organisations in town would desire to be represented. School children were seen to be important to be involved for it was they who would take up the task of caring for the avenue in the future.

The location of the avenue was selected for a number of reasons. Firstly the Lower Nemingha Road was chosen as it was not a Main Roads Department road. This meant the trees could be planted close enough together to form an effective avenue. At that time NSW Main Roads required all roadside trees to be planted at least a chain distant from the road on each side and the effect of this on an avenue would be disheartening. It was also noted that as the Lower Nemingha Road was on a flood plain with the excellent soils and regular flooding it would be a place where English oaks would grow well. The committee decided that the trees would be planted at a distance of 13 metres (44 ft) apart with a gap of 11 metres (36 ft) for the roadway and at these distances it was expected that the foliage would interlace overhead forming a cathedral like arch.

By April 1936 99 trees had been promised by Tamworth residents, businesses and community groups including the CWA, RSL and the Light Horse Brigade. Around this time the Main Roads Department of NSW announced that they were currently surveying all main roads from Sydney to Wallangarra with the intention of planting trees along the main access roads into towns. This changed the decision to plant the oaks on the main northern entrance road into town and the committee decided instead that signposts were to be erected on the highway so tourists could take a scenic detour into town via the avenue. This detour was called the "Round Drive" and the lower Nemingha Road was renamed King George V Memorial Avenue.

By 25 June 1936 there were only 15 trees left to source and then the work on the avenue would start immediately. It was announced at that meeting that the opening and dedication of the avenue would occur during the Tamworth's Diamond Jubilee celebrations in October 1936. Tamworth City Council donated the remaining 15 trees.

Deaths

A fatal road accident occurred on King George Avenue in Tamworth, New South Wales, in which a local father was killed. In the aftermath of the crash, his wife died by suicide, hanging herself from a tree along the same stretch of road. Several years later, their daughter, left without parents and reportedly struggling with the effects of the earlier tragedies, also died by suicide at the same location. The sequence of events has since been cited locally as an example of intergenerational trauma and the lingering psychological impact of sudden loss.

In the late 1960s, King George Avenue in Tamworth, New South Wales, was the scene of a fatal drag racing accident. Two vehicles engaged in an illegal street race lost control near a residential area, resulting in both cars crashing. The impact killed both drivers at the scene. The incident drew public attention to the dangers of street racing and contributed to growing local concern about road safety and youth driving culture during that period.

Early 1970s, a fatal drag racing incident occurred on King George Avenue in Tamworth, New South Wales. During the race, a young child reportedly ran from a nearby house onto the roadway and was struck by one of the vehicles, resulting in her death. Immediately afterward, both cars lost control and crashed, killing both drivers.

Late 1970s, a fatal car accident occurred along King George Avenue in Tamworth, New South Wales, when a driver lost control of his vehicle during an alleged drag race. The car veered off the road and crashed into a residential house, killing only the driver. No occupants of the home were reported injured.

=== Subsequent developments ===
In the 1950s the Paradise Tourist Park was built by Tamworth City Council at the end of the avenue and King George V Memorial Avenue has been used ever since as a recreational amenity by thousands of townsfolk and visitors each year.

The devastating 1955 floods washed away the Two Mile Bridge which has never been replaced. The community of Tamworth turned out to clean up the debris from the avenue as part of the post flood clean up. Since then the only access to the avenue has been via the Paradise Bridge (next to the Paradise Tourist Park) close to town. This meant that King George V Avenue became more important as a quiet place to be visited and the avenue has become one of the main wedding and school formal photographic sites in town as well as being a quiet place for workers to have their lunch under the trees.

In 1988 Tamworth City Council and the Department of Environment and Planning contracted Jonathan Falk Planning Consultants Pty Ltd to conduct a heritage study of Tamworth. Their report states that the avenue was also an important memorial to servicemen killed in World War I. In 1936 the Northern Daily Leader reported that the RSL and the Light Horse Brigade donated monies to purchase some of the trees for the avenue.

In 1992 after years of public pressure Tamworth City Council agreed to establish an official register of significant trees. The Council called on members of the public to advise on which trees they believed should be protected and the reasons why. After much community consultation EJE Landscape Consultants from Sydney produced the Register of Significant Trees for Tamworth City Council in 1993 which included the King George V Memorial Avenue of English Oaks.

In March 2004 Tamworth City Council proposed to remove the trees on the avenue due to ongoing decay of the trees and the forward planning for an access road to future subdivisions at Calala. The plan was to remove the trees and replant with 5–10 metres (16–33 ft) high English oaks at a cost of $350 - $2500 each. This caused huge public outcry and a petition of 3,000 signatures was quickly collected resulting in no further action being taken.

In August 2010 a development application (DA) was lodged with TRC to use King George V Avenue as the access route for a major subdivision of 500+ lots. This proposal spurred an ongoing campaign by the community and its visitors to save this much loved and historic avenue. Due to the age of the trees and the narrow distance between the trees any increase in traffic flow would mean eventual road widening and loss of the trees as well as the loss of the peace and tranquility afforded by the trees and quiet location.

In November 2011 another DA was lodged with council to trench through the root protection zone of the trees in order to place a wastewater pipeline. The decision whether to approve this pipeline was deferred in December 2012 pending a comprehensive arborist report as the initial report submitted with the DA did not comply with the Australian Standard AS4709 2009 Protection of Trees in Development zones. The DA was subsequently withdrawn.

In 2011 a valuation, commissioned by the community, by Thyer Amenity Tree Valuation Services valued the avenue to be worth millions of dollars to the community for its amenity, aesthetics and historic value. Its aesthetic values is evidenced by its prolific use as a backdrop for commercial and personal photography and its amenity values lie in its use for personal and club fitness activities. Over the years this avenue has become one of the most beautiful tourist attractions Tamworth has to offer.

In February 2013 the National Trust of Australia (NSW Branch) listed the avenue as one of State significance as a rare example of an avenue of English Oaks in NSW and the only one carefully planted to grow and produce an interlocking cathedral like effect from the branches joining overhead. It is of historical significance as it was planted as a memorial to King George V in 1936 from the last of the eras when English Oaks were used for street tree plantings and commemorative plantings.

From the first decision to plant the avenue to their care and now the current campaign to save the trees King George V Memorial Avenue has been an important part of Tamworth's history for 77 years. It represents a time in history after the Boer War and World War 1 when avenues of honour were popular with communities. After WWI the interest in living memorials waned. It is also a representative of the last era when English Oak trees were commonly used for road side plantings, their use declining due to the difficulty in selecting areas where they would grow successfully.

In March 2014 the avenue was listed on the NSW State Heritage Register.

== Description ==
The surrounding land consists of flat alluvial flood plain used for a variety of agricultural purposes, including grain crops, lucerne and livestock grazing. Some of these fields are irrigated using water drawn from the adjacent Peel River. A small number of farm houses are located along the roadway.

Avenue

The original planting in 1936 comprised 318 trees which were planted along the Lower Nemingha Road (renamed King George V Memorial Avenue).

King George V Avenue is divided into two sections - the main section runs for 1.5 kilometres (0.93 mi) from the south east end of the main street (Peel Street) heading in a south easterly direction. This section comprises 200 trees of which 140 are of the original planting as well as 60 replacement trees of varying ages. There are 99 trees on the western side and 101 on the eastern side. These trees form a nearly continuous cathedral-like canopy for 1.5 kilometres (0.93 mi) as per the original concept ) for the planting.

Secondary Avenue

After 1.5 kilometres (0.93 mi) the avenue takes a 90 degree turn to the north- east and runs for 0.5 kilometres (0.31 mi) in a straight line to the Peel River, where the road used to cross via the Two Mile Bridge onto the Upper Nemingha Road (now the New England Highway). The bridge was closed to vehicles sometime between 1936 and when it was washed away in the 1955 floods). Since that time this section of the road has been closed off and used to graze stock. This section of the avenue still has 41 of the original 70 trees. No replanting of the trees in this section has been undertaken.

The trees are planted 13 metres (44 ft) apart with a gap of 11 metres (36 ft) for the roadway. The trees are planted 1m off the road. The growth of the English Oak is such that the foliage has interlaced overhead forming an arch as per the original intent of the avenue. The avenue then used to extend 100 metres (330 ft) from Two Mile bridge to the Upper Nemingha Road until recently when the trees were removed in 2012 to make way for a carpark and entrance to a church.

=== Condition ===
As at 22 April 2013, the condition of the avenue ranges from excellent to fair depending on the tree. As a whole the avenue is in good condition despite the poor care and management practices to date.

In 2009 the Australian Tree Consultants (ATC) were commissioned to assess the first half of the longer section of the avenue and found by them to be in varying conditions of health. In their opinion the trees examined ranged in condition from excellent to over-mature. They also found that the main reason for the relatively recent reduction in the health of the trees has been due to the inappropriate tree lopping practices by energy companies.

These lopping practices are still being carried out and despite assurances in writing, that the trees would only be pruned in winter to minimise the damage, once again Essential Energy tree crews were pruning the avenue in the recent spring. This is despite their own vegetation management plan which states in section 7.1 "Significant, special character, protected, memorial and heritage trees may require more frequent trims to minimise impact or the consideration of alternative solutions as detailed in the section of this plan called Alternatives to Pruning.

Australian Tree Consultants reported that an ongoing program of care and replacement would ensure the avenue could be maintained in good condition for many years to come.

Port Arthur has historic oak trees that are estimated to be 150 years old and despite health issues caused by soil compaction (from tourist access) - they were assessed to have at least another 50+ years left if cared for appropriately.

The second and shorter section of the avenue has 40 of the 70 original trees still in existence. These trees were grazed on by stock until steel barriers were installed some years ago. Since that time the trees have partially recovered with some magnificent specimens. They also do not have the regular poor pruning practices carried out by the power companies contributing to their damage.

In October 2015 an inspection by Andrew Morton of Earthscape Horticultural Services revealed that sections were succumbing to significant decline in health, evidenced by:

- a number of completely dead trees;
- substantial crown dieback;
- production of epicormic growth;
- substantial pest infestation which has led to branch failures and in the worst cases, collapse of all major primary limbs.

There is also evidence that trees have been declining for some years, indicated by a large no. of gaps in the original avenue (particularly in the section of unformed road running perpendicular to the main avenue) and a number of recent plantings undertaken to fill the gaps left by trees that have been removed. The integrity of the avenue is good.

=== Modifications and dates ===
Since the planning and subsequent 1936 planting of the avenue by the community of Tamworth, the following modifications have been made:

- Early 1950s to present day – Paradise tourist park opened at the end of the avenue. Thousands of visitors each year enjoy the shade and amenity of the avenue
- 1955 – Loss of the Two Mile bridge at the other end of the avenue which stopped the road being used as a detour tourist route into town
- 1955 – major floods leaving masses of debris along the avenue
- 1960–70s – installation of high voltage power lines along both sides of the avenue
- 1970s–present day – damaging tree lopping practices by the energy companies
- 1988 – Tamworth Heritage study by Falk Consultants Pty Ltd found that the avenue is also an important memorial for WWI
- 1992 – Tamworth City Council (TCC) responded to community concerns about loss of trees in town by calling for submissions for trees to be added to a significant tree register citing King George V Avenue as the example of trees to be registered
- 1993 – TCC significant tree register (STR) published. The normal practice from here is for the trees to be placed on the LEP as heritage items. This has not been done to date
- Mid 2000 – major upgrade to high voltage powerline along the eastern side of the avenue with the resultant ongoing reduction of the canopy by pruning
- 2009 – metal barriers erected to protect the 40 remaining trees on the shorter section of the avenue. This was done before this section was allowed to be closed off and used to graze stock by the two adjacent farms. The road has been kept as a designated public road to allow visitors to access the trees
- 2010 – submission of a DA to use King George V Avenue as the major access road to a planned residential subdivision with a traffic flow predicted in excess of 3,000 cars per day. The arborist report with the DA stated that the avenue would not sustain constant use as a major traffic route
- June 2011 – submission to council for an upgrade to the power lines that run both sides of the avenue to enable power to be sold to developers
- November 2011 – submission to trench a waste water pipeline beside the avenue for its entire length without the appropriate arborist reports showing compliance with the Australian Standard for the Protection of Trees in development zones AS4970 2009. This pipeline DA was considered by the Joint Regional Planning Panel in December 2012 and decision deferred pending a complete and appropriate arborist report
- 2012 – the last remaining oak trees from the other side of where the Two Mile bridge used to be up to the New England Highway were removed to make way for a carpark and entrance to a church.
- August 2012 – TreeAH was used as a tool to evaluate the heritage significance of the avenue. This was presented at the International Society of Arborists annual conference in Portland by Mark Wadey from Barrell Tree Consultancy
- September 2012 – extensive tree pruning by Essential Energy contractors in spring despite a letter from the company stating they will only do these damaging practices in winter when the trees are dormant
- November 2012 – DA for stage 1 of the Peel River Estate approved by Tamworth Regional Council for the first 104 lots. Second DA up for public exhibition (closing date 7/1/13) for the next 46 lots. Once 150 lots are approved the Peel River Estate must decide on a second access road to the planned development of 500 lots. To date the traffic plans submitted with the DA's are to use King George V Avenue as the major access to the development. The road in its current form does not comply with AMCORD regulations for road safety and its use as an access will necessitate road widening with the removal of 100+ trees

At various dates the community have replanted trees as evidenced by the differing ages of the replacements and there is a regular watering program of the younger trees carried out by the community during dry periods. Adjacent lucerne farmers allow irrigation water to go over the fence to water the avenue. Major floods have occurred approximately every 3 – 5 years apart from years when there are long and severe droughts. The oak trees have survived many floods and numerous droughts since their planting and the major cause of their ill health and loss over the years has been the poor pruning practices by the energy companies. They now face an even greater threat from the proposed access road and pipeline.

=== Further information ===
The integrity is good to excellent.

At the first public meeting about the avenue on 28 February 1936 the townspeople and the Town Beautification and Progress Association agreed that a memorial avenue of English oak trees should be planted in honor of King George V. It was also decided that for an avenue to be effective the trees should be planted close to the roadway. The Lower Nemingha Road (later renamed to King George V Avenue) was selected because the trees could be planted close enough to the road so that when they reached maturity they would join overhead to form a cathedral-like canopy.

The avenue has formed this desired canopy and it is still nearly continuous along the 2 kilometres (1.2 mi).

The 1936 meeting also decided that the town to create a scenic drive close to town to which visitors could be taken. The "Round Drive" still exists but the final 0.5 kilometres (0.31 mi) section is no longer driveable due to the loss of the Two Mile bridge back over the river in the 1955 floods with this portion of the road subsequently being closed to traffic.

Changes since 1936 have been:

1. The installation in the 1960-70's of substantial high voltage power lines along the both sides of the avenue. This has necessitated the subsequent extensive and damaging lopping by the energy companies; and
2. The use of the avenue by the occasional high vehicle has also resulted in damage to the canopy.

== Heritage listing ==
The Avenue is of state heritage significance for its aesthetic values as the carefully planned planting has allowed the distinctive growth habit of oak trees to form a cathedral or tunnel like effect as the branches have grown and interlocked over the roadway, making the avenue aesthetically distinctive. It is also one of the longest avenues in NSW being two kilometres (one point two miles) long. Being the only avenue of oak trees planted in NSW, the avenue is aesthetically distinctive and has unique landmark qualities.

The King George V Memorial Avenue of English Oaks of State heritage significance for its rarity values as the only Avenue of Oaks in NSW. It is the only avenue of oaks dedicated as a living memorial to King George V from the last era where avenues of trees were used to mark historic events and people. It is a rare example of a substantially intact avenue of oaks still surviving in NSW and possibly in Australia.

Its rarity values are enhanced as the avenue is one of only two memorial avenues to King George V in NSW, the other being an avenue of poplars in Braidwood which does not have the same aesthetic qualities as the avenue of oak trees.

The item is of state heritage significance as a good representative example of a memorial avenue where this type of planting was enthusiastically embraced by Australian communities for commemorative plantings.

King George V Avenue of Memorial English Oaks was listed on the New South Wales State Heritage Register on 12 March 2014 having satisfied the following criteria.

The place is important in demonstrating the course, or pattern, of cultural or natural history in New South Wales.

The avenue is of local heritage significance as a memorial planting planned and organised by Tamworth Council and community as an expression of their appreciation of the benevolent rule of the British monarch King George V after his death in January 1936. The avenue planting project, actively supported by Rotary, and the Tamworth Beautification and Progress Association, is also of local historic significance as the first community project by any service clubs in Tamworth.

The place has a strong or special association with a person, or group of persons, of importance of cultural or natural history of New South Wales's history.

The historic significance of the King George V Memorial Avenue of English Oaks is enhanced through its association with the local community and its expression of admiration and respect for King George V after his death in 1936. It is also locally important through its association with the local service clubs as their first community project.

The place is important in demonstrating aesthetic characteristics and/or a high degree of creative or technical achievement in New South Wales.

The Avenue is of aesthetic significance at a State level as the carefully planned planting has allowed the distinctive growth habit of oak trees to form a cathedral or tunnel like effect as the branches have grown and interlocked over the roadway, making the avenue aesthetically distinctive. It is also one of the longest avenues in NSW being 1.5 kilometres (0.93 mi) long. Being the only avenue of oak trees planted in NSW, the avenue is aesthetically distinctive and has unique landmark qualities.

The place has strong or special association with a particular community or cultural group in New South Wales for social, cultural or spiritual reasons.

The King George V Avenue of Memorial English Oaks is of local heritage significance for its association with the Tamworth community the forebears of which designed and planted to a loved king. The public amenity of the avenue and its recreational values are important to the community and contribute to the sense of place in Tamworth.

The place possesses uncommon, rare or endangered aspects of the cultural or natural history of New South Wales.

The King George V Memorial Avenue of English Oaks is of State heritage significance as the only Avenue of Oaks in NSW and the only avenue of oaks dedicated as a living memorial to King George V from the last era where avenues of trees were used to mark historic events and people. It is a rare example of a substantially intact avenue of oaks still surviving in NSW and possibly in Australia.

This avenue is one of only two memorial avenues to King George V in NSW, the other being an avenue of poplars in Braidwood which does not have the same aesthetic qualities as the avenue of oak trees.

The place is important in demonstrating the principal characteristics of a class of cultural or natural places/environments in New South Wales.

The item is of state heritage significance as a good representative example of a memorial avenue where this type of planting was enthusiastically embraced by Australian communities for commemorative plantings.
