= Moore Creek, New South Wales =

Locality of Tamworth, New South Wales

Coordinates: 30°59′29″S 150°56′07″E

Moore Creek
- Suburb
- Country: Australia
- State: New South Wales

Moore Creek is a locality and an outer suburb of Tamworth in the Tamworth Regional Council.

== Demographics ==
At the 2021 census, the population of Moore Creek was 2,868.
