= Tamworth central business district, New South Wales =

Coordinates: 31.09°S 150.93°E

Tamworth Central Business District
- Suburb
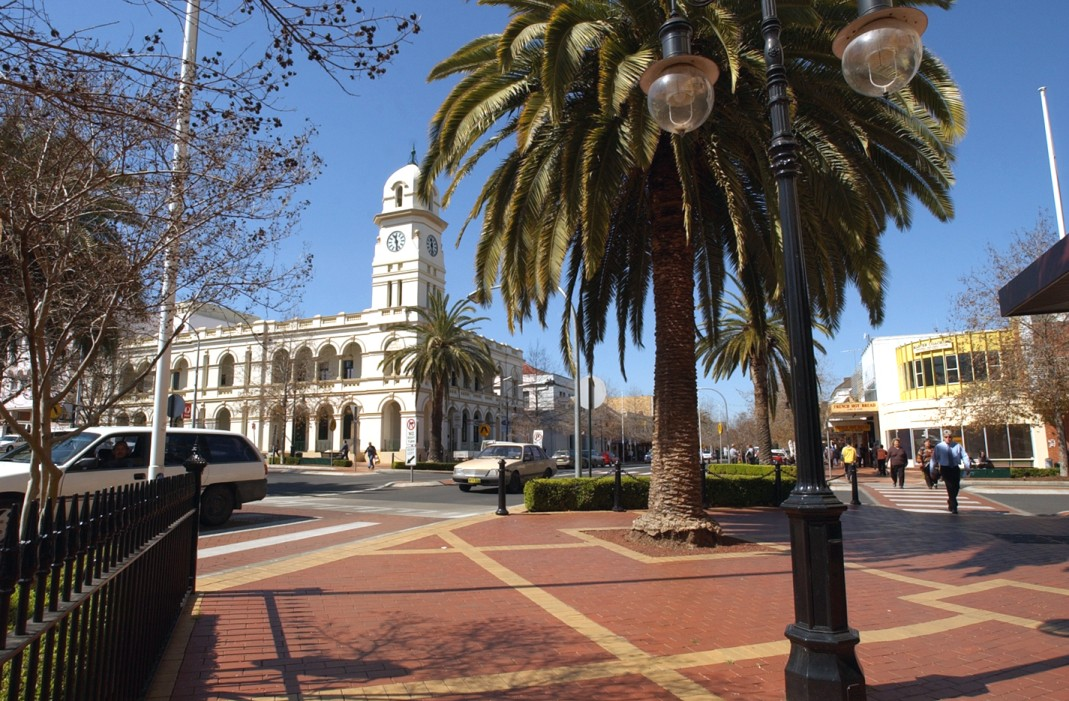
- Peel St
- Interactive map of Tamworth Central Business District
- Country: Australia
- State: New South Wales
- City: Tamworth
- LGA: Tamworth Regional Council

Government
  - State electorate: Tamworth
  - Federal division: New England
- Postcode: 2340
Suburbs around Tamworth Central Business District
| North Tamworth | East Tamworth |
| North Tamworth | Tamworth Central Business District | Nemingha |
| Taminda | West Tamworth |

The Tamworth Central Business District is a suburb of Tamworth, New South Wales, Australia, in the city centre and is located north of the Peel River. It is primarily a business area of Tamworth, with many shops, restaurants, car dealerships, as well as shopping centres and public facilities. The Tamworth Regional Council has its headquarters in Peel St at Ray Walsh House. Bicentennial Park and number one cricket oval are also located in the suburb.

== Peel Street ==
The majority of shops and shopping centres are located along Peel Street, the main street. Named after former British Prime Minister Robert Peel, it was refurbished in the 1990s as part of the city's urban and streetscape renewal. There are approximately a few hundred shops in the main street, as well as restaurants, street cafés and banks. These include a large Target department store (formerly Grace Bros), ANZ, Commonwealth, Westpac and St George banks.

=== Shopping Centres ===
- Centrepoint Shopping Centre – A$35 million shopping centre began construction in early 2007 and was completed in 2008 behind the Tamworth Town Hall, in the CBD between the old city library and behind the specialty shops in Peel Street. It will link up with the current small Centrepoint Arcade through which access to Peel Street will be and the entire centre will be known as Centrepoint Shopping Centre. Franklins supermarket opened in the centre as well as five cinemas and a performing arts centre/theatre that also doubles as a cinema, a boutique bowling alley and karaoke concept, restaurants, food court and 40 specialty shops. The Franklins Supermarket closed down and was later subdivided becoming an Aldi and JB Hi-Fi.
- Tamworth City Plaza – Is located in the CBD with 42 shops including Coles, Kmart, Liquorland, fresh food shops, retail shops, services and a food court.
- The Atrium – Is located in the CBD with entrances from Peel Street and Kable Avenue. It is known for its lack of quality shops and settings. Although the centre has recently undergone a substantial upgrade, including a new range of boutique retails, it fails to appeal to local residents.

== Public Institutions ==
- Tamworth Regional Library
- Tamworth Regional Art Gallery
- Tamworth Regional Council.

== Sport ==
- Tamworth Velodrome
- Number One Cricket Oval
- Tamworth City Pool
