= Warral, New South Wales =

Locality in New South Wales, Australia

Coordinates: 31°09′55″S 150°51′04″E

Warral is a small locality south of Tamworth in the New England region of New South Wales, Australia. It lies on the Werris Creek Road and the Main North railway line. A station was located there between 1910 and 1975.

Preceding station	Former services	Following station
West Tamworth towards Wallangarra	Main Northern Line	Duri towards Sydney
