= Oxley High School =

Location
- Piper Street, North Tamworth, New England region, New South Wales; Australia; 31°04′43″S 150°56′22″E

Information
- Type: Government-funded co-educational comprehensive secondary day school
- Established: 1968; 58 years ago
- School district: Peel; Regional North
- Educational authority: NSW Department of Education
- Principal: Natalie Hill
- Teaching staff: 73.0 FTE (2018)
- Years: 7–12
- Enrolment: 967 (2018)
- Campus type: Regional
- Colours: Red, blue and yellow
- Website: oxley-h.schools.nsw.gov.au

Oxley High School is a government-funded co-educational comprehensive secondary day school, located in North Tamworth, in the New England region of New South Wales, Australia.

Established in 1968, the school enrolled approximately 970 students in 2018, from Year 7 to Year 12, of whom 19 percent identified as Indigenous Australians and four percent were from a language background other than English. The school is operated by the NSW Department of Education; the principal is now Natalie Hill.

== Overview ==
The school has four sport houses – Namoi (green), Castlereagh (blue), Macquarie (red) and Hastings (yellow). Oxley has 70 full time teachers, and approximately 12 casual teachers at any one time. It caters for students, with additional learning needs, and provides classes for students with various disabilities and support staff.

On 18 March 2012 the Castlereagh block of the school was destroyed by fire, and subsequently knocked down and rebuilt.

== Notable alumni ==
- Josh Hazlewood, an Australian international cricketer
- Philip Quast, singer and actor
- Susan Coyle, Lieutenant general, AM, CSC, DSM, the future Chief of the Australian Army in July 2026

== See also ==
- List of government schools in New South Wales: G–P
- List of schools in Tamworth
- Education in Australia
