= Hallsville, New South Wales =

Hallsville New South Wales
- Coordinates: 31°1′8″S 150°52′22″E
- Population: 532 (2016)
  - Density: 22.83/km^{2} (59.14/sq mi)
- Postcode(s): 2340
- Area: 23.3 km^{2} (9.0 sq mi)
- Time zone: Australia EST (UTC)
- LGA(s): Tamworth Regional Council
- Region: New England
- County: Inglis
- Parish: Woolomol
- State electorate(s): Tamworth
- Federal division(s): New England

Hallsville is a satellite town of Tamworth in New South Wales, Australia.

Hallsville is located 12.5 km along the Manilla Road north of Tamworth. The suburb is part of the Moore Creek-Daruka-Tintinhull-Hallsville district, where settlement was historically known to start in the mid-1800s. Agriculture has been one of the major sources of livelihood in the area as well as grazing and crop production.

The town is named after John Hall who came to the area in 1877 with his wife Jane (née Gulliver) after they married in Maitland, New South Wales.

Hall was instrumental in establishing the Hallsville Methodist Church in 1894.

== Church history ==
1878 Hallsville Sunday School was started by Hall in his home.

1880 News item from "Tamworth Observer": A Sunday School picnic was held at Hallsville on 24 May. There were 130 people present and the tables groaned under the weight of the food.

1894 May 1. Rev. C. Graham and his wife went out from Tamworth and met with the people of Hallsville. As a result, it was decided to hold a picnic and concert on May 24, Empire Day, to raise funds to build a Church.

1894 August. A committee decided to build the Church of timber instead of brick, as originally planned. September. A tender from a Mr Sneesby for £83/10/- was accepted. Arrangements for a bank overdraft of £50 were made.

1894 There is no record of the actual opening date.

1895 Organ purchased.

1898 Church lined and varnished by Mr J. C. Young, at a cost of £26/10/-.

1908 Original vestry and toilet built at cost of £30/-/-. Tamworth Municipal Council installed electric light, costing £9/2/6.

1915 Band of Hope met monthly for some years prior to this date and possibly after. Anniversary Service. The guest preacher was Rev. W. Roden, a son of the Hallsville school teacher in 1894

1947 Hallsville United Fellowship commenced in September

1954 60th Anniversary. The guest preacher was Rev. Sid Piper, a former Sunday School pupil.

1961 The original vestry was moved to the Fellowship Tennis Courts near Moore Creek. The present vestry was built by Mr A. Barr at a cost of £574.

1964 November. 70th Anniversary was conducted by Rev. Martin Leyton, a former minister, at 11 am and 7.30 pm.

1976 Original vestry returned for extra Sunday School area.

1977 Internal renovations carried out and dedicated by Rev R. Wrightson. Friday night Youth group was formed.

1988 March 22. Parry Shire removed two trees to clear site for a new Church.

1989 July 16. New brick Church opened and dedicated by Rev Clyde Dominish, Moderator of NSW Synod, costing $157,000.

2014 Hallsville Community Church celebrated its 120-year Anniversary on 9 November 2014.

=== Cemetery ===
The burials in the Hallsville Churchyard all belong to one family: John & Jane Hall (née Gulliver). John Hall donated the ground for the church in 1894. The original church was opened in November that year. The new church was built in 1989. John and Jane Hall's house is directly across the road from these churches and graveyard.

== Oxley Memorial ==
Next to the main road between Tamworth and Manilla is an anchor from survey ship HMS Sealark (1903), known as the Oxley Memorial, as it is dedicated to the first Surveyor General of New South Wales, John Oxley, who took this route in 1818.
