= Calala, New South Wales =

Calala
- Suburb
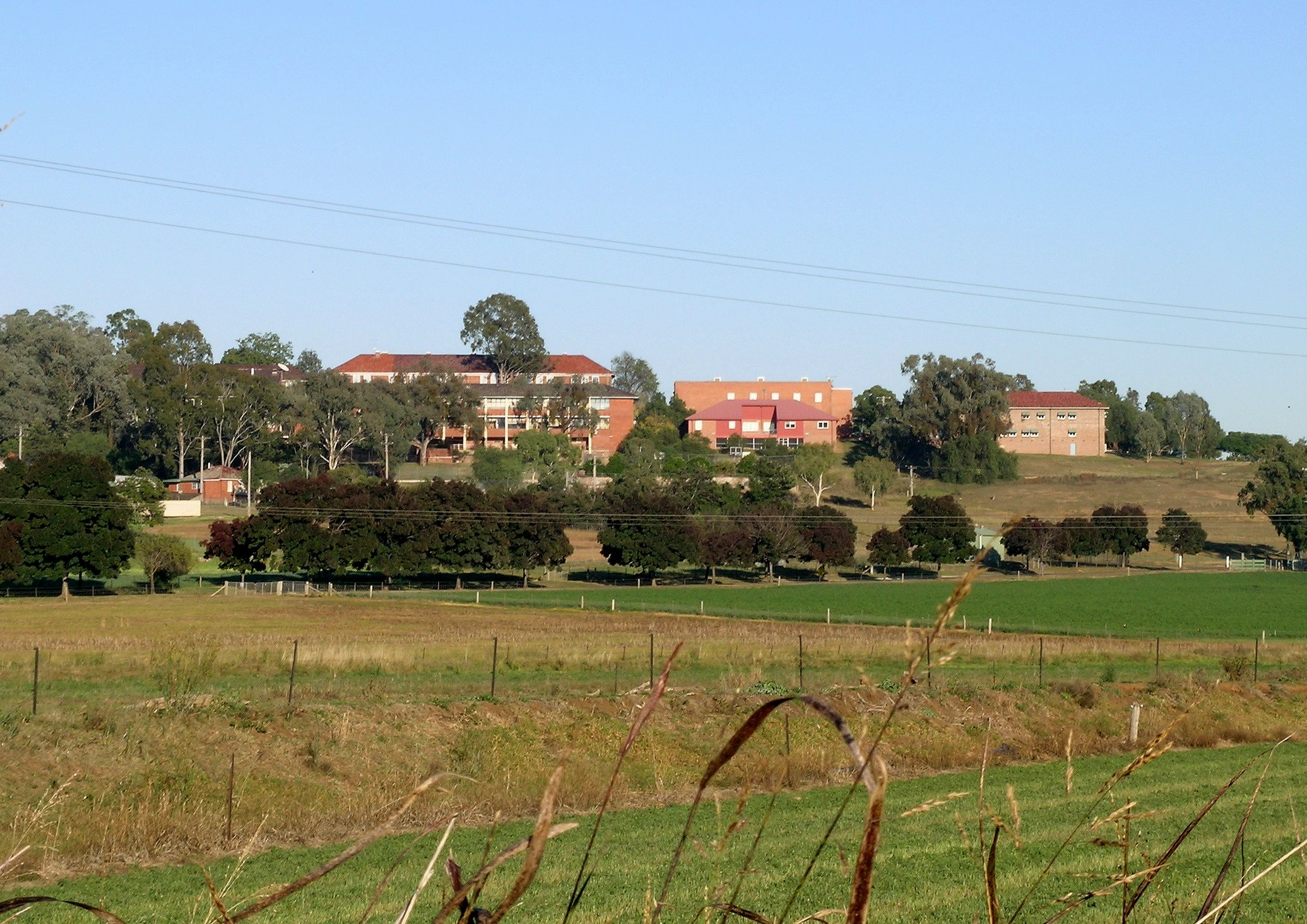
- Farrer Memorial Agricultural High School

- Interactive map of Calala
- Coordinates: 31°08′S 150°57′E
- Country: Australia
- State: New South Wales
- City: Tamworth
- LGA: Tamworth Regional Council

Government
  - State electorate: Tamworth
  - Federal division: New England

Population
  - Total: 3,927 (2016 census)
- Postcode: 2340
Suburbs around Calala
South Tamworth	Calala

Calala is a suburb of the Northern New South Wales city of Tamworth, administered by Tamworth Regional Council. In the 2016 census, Calala had a population of 3,927.

The suburb is 4.5 km southeast of the CBD of Tamworth and is connected to the city by Calala Lane, which continues through the suburb to form its main street. Calala Lane often becomes flooded in times of heavy rain, usually isolating the residents from the rest of the city but generally only for several hours at a time. Further along Calala Lane past the residential area of Calala is Farrer Memorial Agricultural High School and the New South Wales Department of Agriculture plant research institute.

== Commercial area ==
A commercial shopping complex opened in 2006 which now serves the residents of Calala. The complex contains a supermarket, fish and chip takeaway shop, bottle shop, butcher, pharmacy and Northwest Health GP clinic. Calala also contains a smaller shopping centre consisting of a bottle shop, a takeaway shop and a small hippie clothing and giftware store.

== Schools ==
- Carinya Christian School
- Farrer Memorial Agricultural High School, located just outside Calala

== History ==
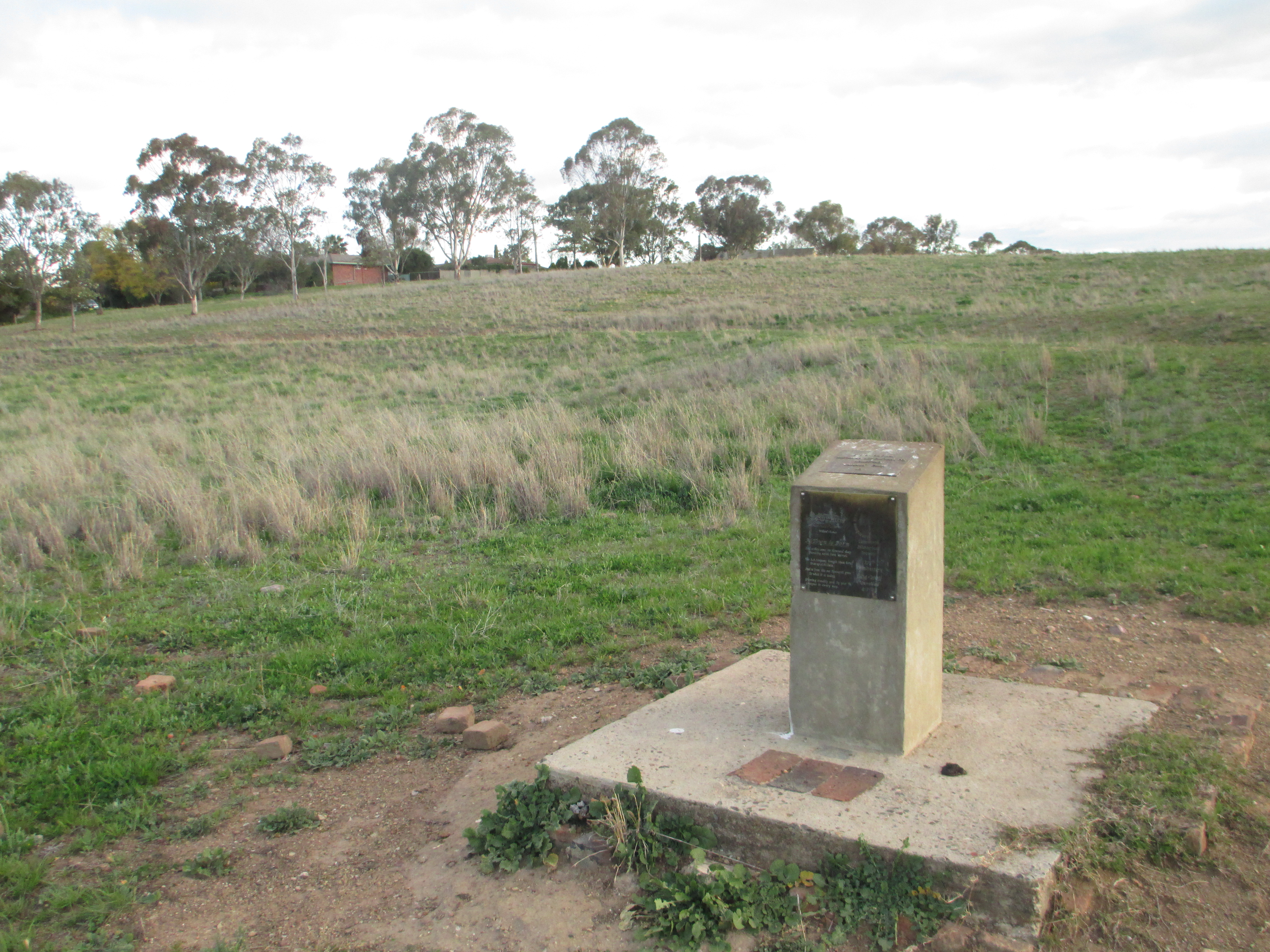
The cement-block marker for Killala, the first house constructed in the Calala area after European settlement. It sits in a field on the northwest outskirts of Calala.

The name "Calala" originates from the local aboriginal name for this area on what is now known as the Peel River. Various anglicised spellings of this name have been used, including "Kalala", "Kilala", "Kallala, and "Callala". The first house in the Calala area, built for Charles Hall in 1834, was named "Killala". An historical marker has been constructed on the northwest outskirts of Calala to recognise this construction.
