= Taminda, New South Wales =

Coordinates: 31°05′00″S 150°54′15″E

Taminda
- Suburb
- Interactive map of Taminda
- Country: Australia
- State: New South Wales
- City: Tamworth
- LGA: Tamworth Regional Council

Government
  - State electorate: Tamworth,
  - Federal division: New England

Population
  - Total: 57 (SAL 2021)
- Postcode: 2340
Suburbs around Taminda
Oxley Vale	North Tamworth	East Tamworth
	Taminda	West Tamworth
	West Tamworth	West Tamworth

Taminda is an industrial suburb of Tamworth, New South Wales, Australia, in the west of the city. It is mostly zoned industrial and consequently its residential population is very low. The northern part of Taminda is flood plains and is used as sporting fields. Floods in 1998 caused much damage in Taminda with rising waters that flowed into businesses. As a result, commencement in 2006 began on building levy banks separating many of the riverside sporting fields and the Peel River from the rest of Taminda where businesses are located to protect property from future floods.
