= Carinya Christian School =

Location
- New England, New South Wales; Australia; 31°07′46″S 150°56′24″E

Information
- School type: Independent comprehensive co-educational early learning, primary, secondary day school
- Religious affiliation: Reformed Church
- Denomination: Westminster Confession of Faith
- Established: 1984; 42 years ago
- Years: Early learning and K–12
- Enrolment: 800
- Campuses: Tamworth; Gunnedah
- Area: 12 hectares (30 acres)
- Campus type: Regional parkland
- Colours: Red, black, white and grey
- Website: www.carinya.nsw.edu.au

Carinya Christian School is a multi-campus independent Christian comprehensive co-educational early learning, primary, secondary day school located in the New England region of New South Wales, Australia. The school caters for approximately 800 students from early learning to Year 12. The School is aligned with the Reformed Church Westminster Confession of Faith.

The Carinya campuses are located in the suburb of Calala five kilometres (three point one miles) from the centre of Tamworth, situated on 12 hectares (30 acres), overlooking flood plains and farmland; and in Gunnedah. The two sites are run by Carinya Christian Education Ltd.

Carinya Tamworth also offers a Gumnut class, a two-day program for three-year-olds. Students come from Gunnedah, Quirindi, Werris Creek, Manilla, Somerton, Narrabri and Carroll.

== History ==
Carinya Christian School Tamworth commenced in May 1984. It started with 6 students in Kindergarten to Year 3. It was founded by religious parents who wished to see their sons and daughters educated at a religious institution.

== Tuition fees ==
In 2024, tuition fees range from approximately AU$4000 to AU$7400 per year.

== Sports ==
Students represent the school in many sports including rugby union (from open primary to first XV), netball, soccer, touch football, rugby league sevens, golf, swimming, hockey, athletics and show cattle. The rugby union teams compete in the LBK Prime Cup Friday night competition, while the netball and soccer teams play in Tamworth Saturday competitions.

== No recognition of achievement ==
Neither academic nor sporting achievement are recognised with awards. This based on the school's philosophy of "seeking the reward in the task".

== See also ==
- List of non-government schools in New South Wales
- Education in Australia
