= Peel High School =

Location
- Tamworth, New England region, New South Wales; Australia; 31°5′56″S 150°53′35″E

Information
- Type: Government-funded co-educational dual modality partially academically selective and comprehensive secondary day school
- Motto: Caring and Being Responsible for Our Futures
- Established: 1976; 50 years ago
- School district: Peel; Rural North
- Educational authority: New South Wales Department of Education
- Principal: Fiona Jackson
- Teaching staff: 60.0 FTE (2018)
- Years: 7–12
- Enrolment: 723 (2018)
- Campus type: Regional
- Colours: Green and yellow
- Website: peel-h.schools.nsw.gov.au

Peel High School is a government-funded co-educational dual modality partially academically selective and comprehensive secondary day school, located in Tamworth, a city in the northwest region of New South Wales, Australia.

Established in 1976, the school enrolled 720 students in 2018, from Year 7 to Year 12, of whom 38 percent identified as Indigenous Australians and six percent were from a language background other than English. The school is operated by the NSW Department of Education; and prepares students for the School Certificate (Year 10), and the NSW Higher School Certificate (Year 12). The principal is Fiona Jackson.

Peel High School has an educational focus on technology.

== Overview ==
Established in 1976, Peel High School was named after Sir Robert Peel, a British politician from the time of the British discovery of the Tamworth region. On the first of February 1977, Peel High School occupied its temporary premises at the rear of Hillvue Public School in demountable buildings while permanent buildings were being constructed at the Gunnedah road site.

The school has with links to the community, parents, Technical and Further Education (TAFE), local businesses and local government schools. It has three special needs classes, Aboriginal education, and is responsible for the offsite annex, Tamworth Tutorial Centre, which caters for students from local schools with conduct disorders.

Peel High School has had success over many years with the breeding of Suffolk sheep and Angus cattle along with poultry breeding and showing. The school is a registered breeder of Suffolk sheep, and has won first prizes at the Sydney Royal Easter Show including Grand Champion Ram, Grand Champion Ewe, Champion Schools Exhibit and most successful school.

== Principals ==
The following individuals have served as principal of Peel High School:

Ordinal	Officeholder	Term start	Term end	Time in office	Notes
1	Jeff Lee	1977	1980	2–3 years	
2	Allen J Smee	1981	1983	1–2 years	
3	Jeff Lee	1984	1985	0–1 years	
4	Dr Ray Dart	1986	2000	13–14 years	
5	Gregory Hyde	2001	2004	2–3 years	
6	Mark Hewitt	2005	2007	1–2 years	
7	Bill Campbell	2007	2017	9–10 years	
8	Patrick Sullivan	2017	2017	0 years	Acting
9	Rodney Jones	2017	2021	8–9 years	
10	Erica Burge	2021	2023	1–2 years	
11	Fiona Jackson	2024~		2 years	

== See also ==
- List of government schools in New South Wales: G–P
- List of selective high schools in New South Wales
- Selective school (New South Wales)
- List of schools in Tamworth
- Education in Australia
