= Nemingha, New South Wales =

Coordinates: 31°06′30″S 150°59′30″E

Nemingha
- Suburb
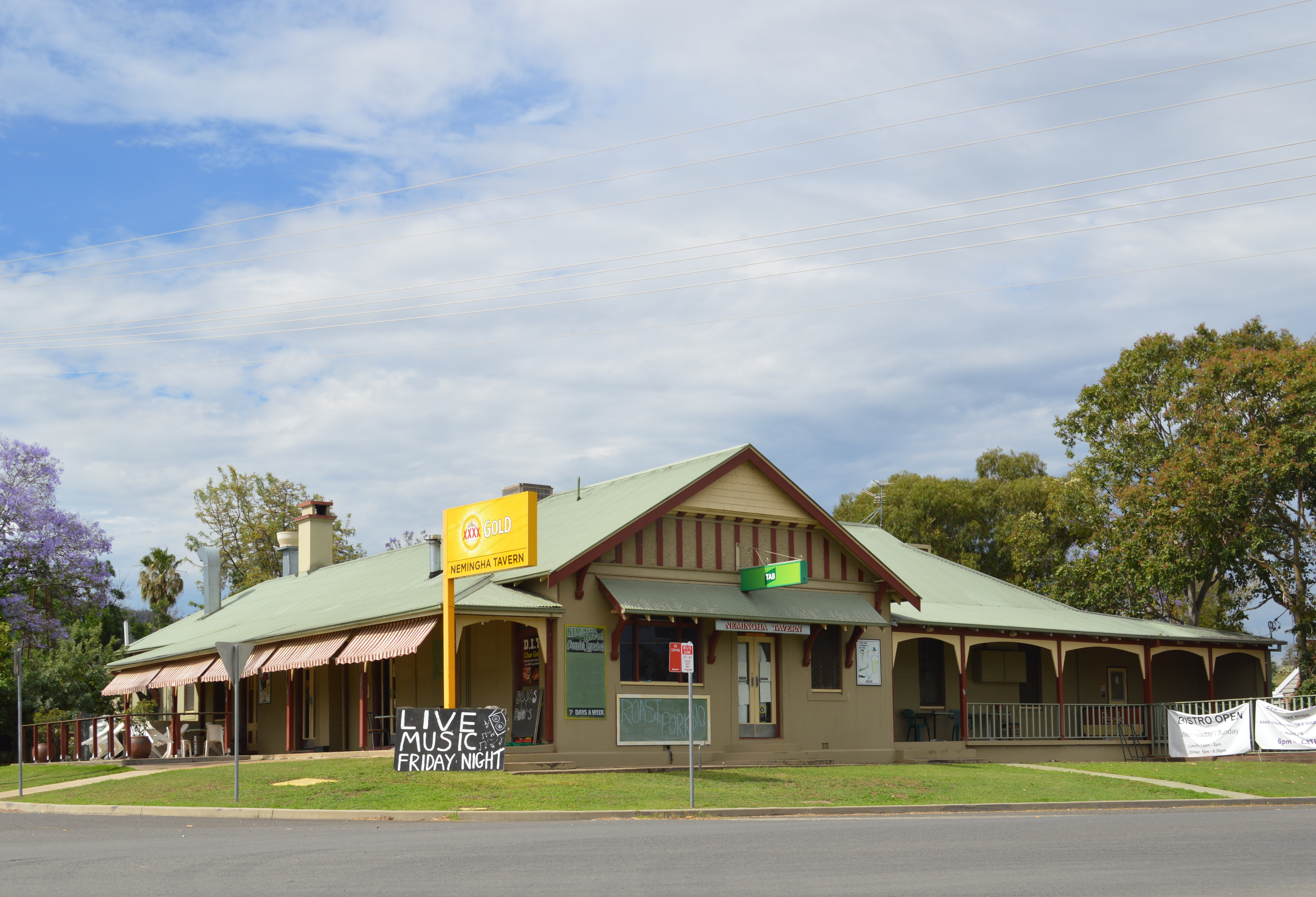
- Nemingha Tavern, 2017
- Interactive map of Nemingha
- Country: Australia
- State: New South Wales
- City: Tamworth
- LGA: Tamworth Regional Council
- Location: 5 km (3.1 mi) from Tamworth

Government
  - State electorate: Tamworth
  - Federal division: New England

Population
  - Total: 705 (SAL 2021)
- Postcode: 2340
Suburbs around Nemingha
East Tamworth
Tamworth Central Business District	Nemingha

Nemingha is an outer suburb of Tamworth, New South Wales, Australia, 5 km east of the Tamworth Central Business District on the New England Highway. West of Nemingha is East Tamworth and the Tamworth Central Business District.

== Schools ==
- Nemingha Public School

Preceding station	Former services	Following station
Tintinhull towards Wallangarra	Main Northern Line	Tamworth towards Sydney
