= West Tamworth, New South Wales =

West Tamworth
- Suburb
- St Paul's Anglican Church, West Tamworth

- Interactive map of West Tamworth
- Coordinates: 31°06′S 150°55′E
- Country: Australia
- State: New South Wales
- City: Tamworth
- LGA: Tamworth Regional Council

Government
  - State electorate: Tamworth
  - Federal division: New England

Population
  - Total: 5,417 (2021 census)
- Postcode: 2340
Suburbs around West Tamworth
	North Tamworth	Tamworth Central Business District
Taminda	West Tamworth
	South Tamworth

West Tamworth is a suburb of Tamworth, New South Wales, Australia, in the city's west. It is between South Tamworth and Taminda (Tamworth Industrial Area). It is an important commercial and residential area of Tamworth. In West Tamworth is the important commercial area of Bridge Street, which is one of the main roads connecting the northern side of Tamworth with the southern. The Oxley Highway runs through part of West Tamworth.

== Commercial area ==
Bridge Street is an important commercial area for Tamworth and many businesses serving the southern side and whole of Tamworth are located upon it. Bridge Street becomes Brisbane Street on the northern side of the Peel River, however Bridge Street is not viewed as a part of the Tamworth Central Business District. Instead, it is viewed as a separate commercial area. Tamworth Shopping World is located on Bridge Street and is a major commercial centre in Tamworth.

== Clubs ==
West Tamworth League Club is located in West Tamworth, and is home of the West Tamworth Lions rugby league club. It is also a popular venue during the Tamworth Country Music Festival in January and artists such as John Butler Trio, The Baileys, John Williamson, Pete Murray, The Waifs, Missy Higgins, Grinspoon, Xavier Rudd and Kasey Chambers have all played at the club. Wests and Wests' Diggers (Kable Avenue in the CBD) are part of the Wests Entertainment Group.

== Sport ==
The Tamworth netball courts, baseball and softball fields are located riverside on the western side of the Peel River. This area is in both West Tamworth and the industrial suburb Taminda. The Tamworth Touch fields are also located riverside in West Tamworth. The West Tamworth Lions rugby league club play at the West Tamworth Leagues Club at their fields are known as Scully Park. Former Australian representative and St. George, player Nathan Blacklock played one game for the West Lions in early 2007. The Tamworth Pirates rugby club play at grounds near the West Lions Scully Park ground, and across the road from the West and South Tamworth Scully Park Olympic Pool. This Olympic pool is council owned and many swimmers use it for training and competition.

=== Rivalries ===
There is a rich tradition of rivalries in Rugby league and Rugby Union between West Tamworth and North Tamworth as the suburbs' football teams represent the western and northern suburbs of Tamworth respectively. In rugby league this rivalry is between the West Tamworth Lions and the North Tamworth Bears, with their clash drawing large crowds each year. In rugby union this rivalry is between the Pirates rugby club and the Tamworth Magpies, with their clash each year also drawing large crowds.

== Coledale ==
Coledale is a section of West Tamworth known to the residents as the area with Gunnedah Road to the north, Duri road to the east and Cole road to the west. Coledale was originally a subdivision named after the late Tamworth mayor Stan Cole. Coledale is notorious for drugs, crime and poverty. Coledale is home to many first nations residents and attracts many racist and derogatory nicknames such as ''Vegemite Village". Coledale has a population of 3,068 down 2.8% from 2001, there are 884 Indigenous residents which make up 28.8% of the population. Coledale underperforms in almost all metrics with a median income 25% lower, and an unemployment rate 3 times higher than the national average. Coledale also has more people without formal educational qualifications, more labourers and less professional workers than the rest of Australia.

Coledale also has a significant amount of social housing consisting of 408 dwellings managed by different authorities. Coledale is a hotspot for crime and various plans by Tamworth Regional Council have been made to reduce crime including their 2017–2022 Crime Prevention Plan.

== Schools ==
- Parry School SSP (School For Specific Purpose)
- Peel High School
- St Josephs Catholic School
- Tamworth West Public School (TWPS)

== Gallery ==
Looking down Bridge St

TWPS Banners

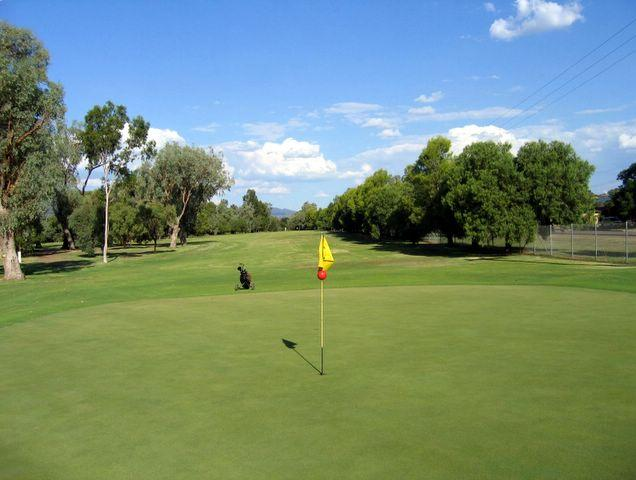
Tamworth Golf Course

Front View TWPS

Preceding station	Former services	Following station
Tamworth towards Wallangarra	Main Northern Line	Warral towards Sydney
