= East Tamworth, New South Wales =

Coordinates: 31°05′23″S 150°56′37″E

East Tamworth
- Suburb
- Interactive map of East Tamworth
- Country: Australia
- State: New South Wales
- City: Tamworth
- LGA: Tamworth Regional Council

Government
  - State electorate: Tamworth
  - Federal division: New England

Population
  - Total: 5,342 (2016 census)
- Postcode: 2340
Suburbs around East Tamworth
North Tamworth
	East Tamworth	Nemingha
Tamworth Central Business District

East Tamworth is a suburb of Tamworth, New South Wales, Australia, in the city's east. It is located between the suburbs of North Tamworth, Tamworth CBD and the satellite suburb of Nemingha. East Tamworth is one of the oldest settled areas of Tamworth, and therefore is known for its wide streets and historical buildings and homes. Many of these historical buildings are the highest valued properties in Tamworth. East Tamworth is home to ANZAC Park, Tamworth Public School, St Nicholas Primary School and Calrossy Anglican School.

== Socio-economic status ==
East Tamworth is considered to be the highest socio-economic area of Tamworth because of property values in the suburb.

== Demographics ==
At the 2011 census, the suburb of East Tamworth recorded a population of 5,212 people. Of these:

- Age distribution: Residents had a slightly older distribution of ages than the country overall. The median age was 41 years, compared to the national median of 37 years. Children aged under 15 years made up 17.8% of the population (national average is 19.3%) and people aged 65 years and over made up 18.7% of the population (national average is 14.0%).
- Ethnic diversity: 86.5% of residents were born in Australia, compared to the national average of 70%; the next most common countries of birth were England 1.6%, New Zealand 0.8%, India 0.4%, United States of America 0.4% and South Africa 0.3%. At home, 91.4% of residents only spoke English; the next most common languages spoken at home were Mandarin 0.3%, Greek 0.2%, Cantonese 0.2%, Dutch 0.2% and Korean 0.2%.
- Finances: The median household weekly income was $1,161, compared to the national median of $1,234. This difference is also reflected in real estate, with the median mortgage payment being $1,408 per month, compared to the national median of $1,800.
- Transport: On the day of the Census, 0.6% of employed people travelled to work on public transport and 73.4% by car (either as driver or as passenger).
- Housing: Of occupied private dwellings in East Tamworth (State Suburbs), 83% were separate houses, 13% were flats, units or apartments and 3% were semi-detached (row or terrace houses, townhouses). The average household size was 2.3 people.

== Recreation ==
East Tamworth has many sporting facilities available for its residents including The Courts @ East, a tennis club that has been recently renovated at a cost of $3.4 million to upgrade to 13 championship standard courts as well as viewer amenities. The Tamworth croquet club runs weekly tournaments and had its rent controversially hiked to $500, it has 30 members who are mostly pensioners and retirees. Tamworth City Bowling Club is a lawn bowls club that has over 1150 members, its membership doubled in the past 7 years and is an important community hub hosting everything from barefoot bowls to Zumba classes for seniors, become of its large membership it has been called 'the hub of the community in East'.

== Schools ==
- Tamworth Public School
- St Nicholas Primary School
- Calrossy Anglican School
