= Oxley Vale, New South Wales =

Coordinates: 31°02′55″S 150°53′05″E

Oxley Vale Tamworth, New South Wales
- Population: 3,742 (2016 census)
- Postcode(s): 2340
- LGA(s): Tamworth Regional Council
- State electorate(s): Tamworth,
- Federal division(s): New England
Suburbs around Oxley Vale:
Hallsville
Oxley Vale
	North Tamworth

Oxley Vale is a suburb of Tamworth, New South Wales, Australia, which runs either side of Manilla road. It is between the suburbs of North Tamworth and the satellite suburb of Hallsville. Oxley Vale is a largely residential suburb. Nazareth House nursing house is located there.

== Mobile Phone Blackspot Program ==
Vodafone will serve the town and surrounding area with mobile phone service as part of the National Blackspot Program from Q4 2016.

== Sports ==
- Oxley Vale Attunga Football Club is the major sporting club of this suburb. Oxley Vale Attunga although playing in North Tamworth it draws the majority of its players and thousands of supporters from this suburb.

== Schools ==
- Oxley Vale Public School
- St. Marys Catholic School
