= Tamworth Regional Council =

- Local government area
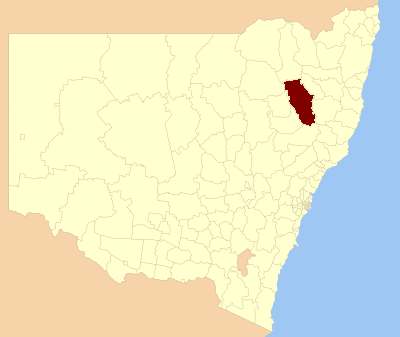
- Location in New South Wales

- Interactive map of Tamworth Regional Council
- Coordinates: 31°05′S 150°55′E
- Country: Australia
- State: New South Wales
- Region: New England
- Established: March 2004
- Council seat: Tamworth

Government
  - Mayor: Russell Webb
  - State electorate: Tamworth
  - Federal division: New England

Area
  - Total: 9,894 km^{2} (3,820 sq mi)

Population
  - Total: 63,070 (2021 census)
  - Density: 6.3746/km^{2} (16.5101/sq mi)
- Website: Tamworth Regional Council
LGAs around Tamworth Regional Council
Narrabri	Gwydir	Uralla
Gunnedah	Tamworth Regional Council	Walcha
Liverpool Plains	Liverpool Plains	Upper Hunter

Tamworth Regional Council is a local government area in the New England region of New South Wales, Australia. The area under administration is located adjacent to the New England Highway and the Main North railway line. It was established in March 2004 through the amalgamation of the former City of Tamworth with the surrounding shires of Barraba, Manilla, Nundle and Parry.

The mayor of Tamworth Regional Council is Russell Webb, who was elected (by councillors) despite earning only 6.73% of the community's first preference votes, compared to Mark Rodda, who earned 25.63% of the community's first preference votes.

The current Member for the state electoral district of Tamworth is Kevin Anderson, a member of the National Party.

== Towns and villages ==
The area includes the city of Tamworth and the towns and villages of Attunga, Barraba, Bendemeer, Dungowan, Duri, Kootingal, Limbri, Manilla, Moonbi, Niangala, Nundle, Ogunbil, Somerton, Upper Manilla and Woolbrook.

== Suburbs ==
- Calala
- Coledale
- Daruka Estate
- East Tamworth
- Forest Hills
- Hillvue
- Kingswood
- Nemingha
- North Tamworth
- Oxley Vale
- South Tamworth
- Taminda
- Tamworth
- Tamworth Central Business District
- Westdale
- West Tamworth

== Heritage listings ==
Tamworth Region has a number of heritage-listed sites, including:

- Kootingal, New England Highway: Moonby House
- Manilla, Tamworth-Barraba railway: Manilla railway underbridges
- Tamworth, Fitzroy Street: Tamworth Post Office
- Tamworth, King George V Memorial Avenue (East): King George V Avenue of Memorial English Oaks
- Tamworth, Main Northern railway: Tamworth railway station
- Tamworth, Main Northern railway: Peel River railway bridge
- Tamworth, Marius Street (East): Dominican Roman Catholic Convent
- Tamworth, Peel Street (cnr): Tamworth Peel Barracks

== Demographics ==
At the 2021 census, there were 63,070 people in the Tamworth Regional Local Government Area, of these 49.0 per cent identified as male and 51.0 per cent identified as female. Aboriginal and Torres Strait Islander people made up 12.7 per cent of the population, which was greater than three times higher than the national average of 3.2 per cent. The median age of people in the Tamworth Regional Council was 39 years, which was marginally higher than the national median of 38 years. Children aged 0–14 years made up 20.2 per cent of the population and people aged 65 years and over made up 19.8 per cent of the population. Of people in the area aged 15 years and over, 44.6 per cent were married and 11.8 per cent were either divorced or separated.

Population growth in the Tamworth Regional Local Government Area between the 2011 Census and the 2016 Census was 6.0 per cent. When compared with total population growth of Australia for the same period, being 8.8 per cent, population growth in the Tamworth Regional Local Government Area was slightly lower than the national average.

The median weekly income for residents within the Tamworth Regional Council was lower than the national average, this downwards trend compared to the national average was also seen with personal and family incomes.

At the 2021 Census, the proportion of residents in the Tamworth Regional local government area who stated their ancestry as Australian or Anglo-Saxon was about 83.3 per cent of all residents (the national average was around 62.9 per cent). About 49.2% of all residents in the Tamworth Regional Local Government Area nominated a religious affiliation with Christianity at the 2021 Census, which was higher than the national average of approximately 32.4 per cent. Meanwhile, as at the 2021 Census date, compared to the national average, households in the Tamworth Regional Local Government Area had a significantly lower than average proportion (6.8 per cent) where two or more languages are spoken (the national average was 24.8 per cent); and a significantly higher proportion (87.2 per cent) where English only was spoken at home (the national average was 72.0 per cent).

Selected historical Census data for the Tamworth Regional Local Government Area
Census year		2001	2006	2011	2016	2021
Population	Estimated residents on Census night	n/a	53,590	▲56,292	▲59,663	▲63,070
Population	LGA rank in terms of size within New South Wales			43rd	▲40th	
Population	% of New South Wales population		0.80%	▲0.81%	▼0.80%	▼0.78%
Population	% of Australian population	n/a	0.27%	▼0.26%	0.26%	▼0.24%
Cultural and language diversity						
Ancestry, top responses	Australian			37.5%	▼35.9%	▲43.6%
Ancestry, top responses	English			31.0%	▼30.1%	▲39.7%
Ancestry, top responses	Irish			8.5%	▲8.6%	▲10.7%
Ancestry, top responses	Scottish			7.3%	▲7.4%	▲9.7%
Ancestry, top responses	German			3.2%	3.2%	-
Language, top responses (other than English)	Tagalog		n/c	▲0.1%	▲0.4%	▲0.5%
Language, top responses (other than English)	Cantonese		0.1%	0.1%	▲0.2%	-
Language, top responses (other than English)	Mandarin		0.1%	0.1%	▲0.4%	▲0.7%
Language, top responses (other than English)	Filipino				0.2%	-
Language, top responses (other than English)	German		0.1%	0.1%	-	-
Language, top responses (other than English)	Italian		0.1%	0.1%	-	-
Language, top responses (other than English)	Religious affiliation					
Religious affiliation, top responses	Anglican		38.4%	▼36.2%	▼30.0%	▼24.0%
Religious affiliation, top responses	Catholic		26.5%	▼25.9%	▼24.4%	▼21.8%
Religious affiliation, top responses	No Religion		9.5%	▲12.6%	▲19.3%	▲31.1%
Religious affiliation, top responses	Uniting Church		6.3%	▼5.5%	▼4.4%	▼3.4%
Religious affiliation, top responses	Presbyterian and Reformed		5.3%	▼5.0%	-	-
Median weekly incomes						
Personal income	Median weekly personal income		$405	▲$515	▲$633	▲$755
Personal income	% of Australian median income		86.9%	▲89.3%	▲95.3%	▲93.7%
Family income	Median weekly family income		A$1,041	A$1,181	A$1,446	▲$1,821
Family income	% of Australian median income		88.9%	▼79.7%	▲81.2%	▲85.8%
Household income	Median weekly household income		A$818	A$958	A$1,180	▲$1,416
Household income	% of Australian median income		79.6%	▼77.6%	▲79.4%	▲81.0%

== Council ==
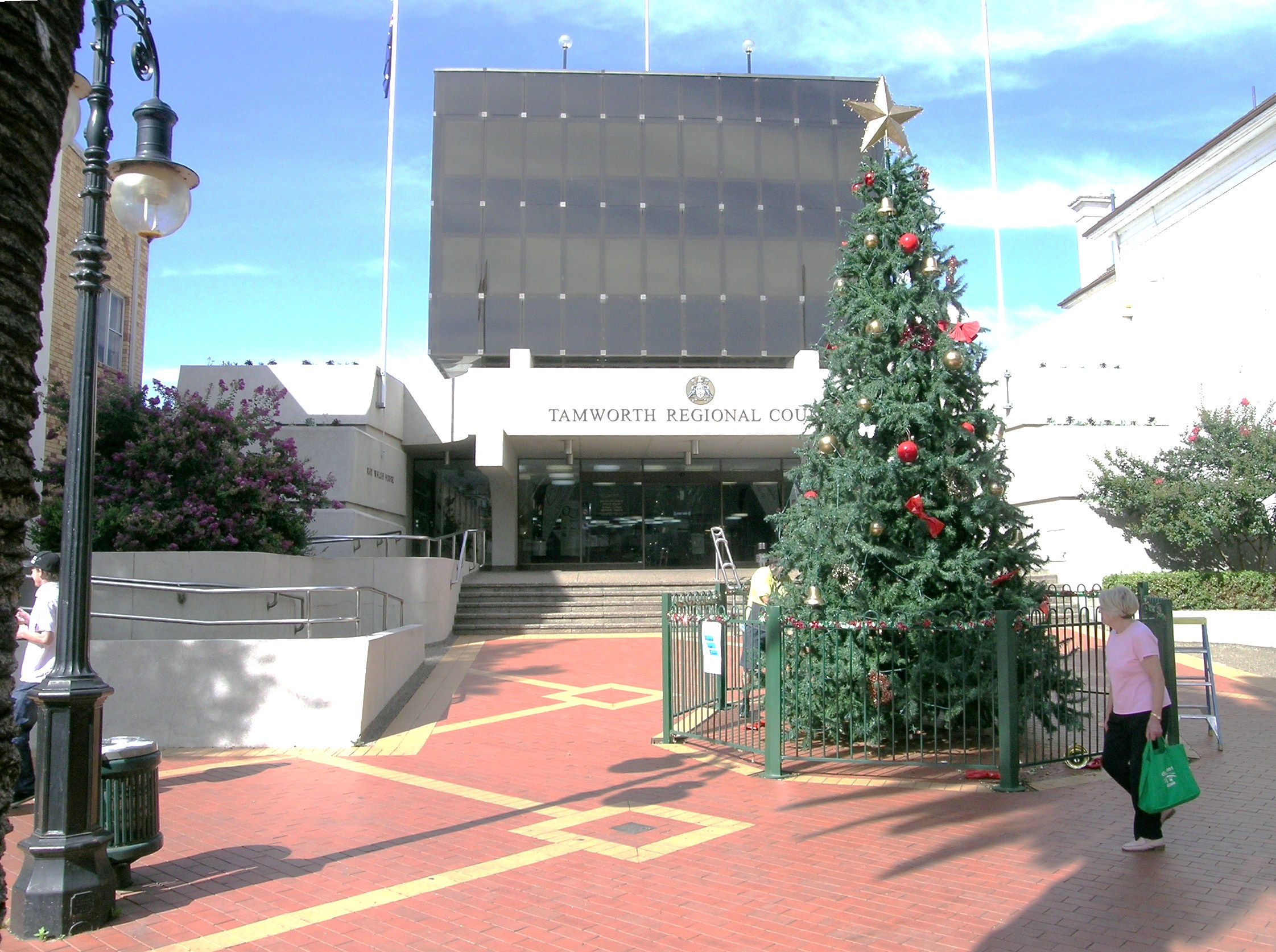
Tamworth Regional Council chambers, in Tamworth

=== Current composition and election method ===
Tamworth Regional Council is composed of nine councillors elected proportionally as a single ward. All councillors are elected for a fixed four-year term of office. The mayor is elected by the councillors at the first meeting of the council. The most recent election was held on 4 December 2021, and the makeup of the council is as follows:

Party	Councillors
Independent	7
Independent National	1
Labor	1
Total	9

The current council, elected in 2021, in order of election, is:

Councillor	Party	Notes
Bede Bourke	Independent National	Deputy Mayor
Russell Webb	Independent	Mayor
Mark Rodda	Independent	
Marc Sutherland	Independent	
Phil Betts	Independent	
Helen Tickle	Independent	
Brooke Southwell	Independent	
Stephen Meares	Labor	
Judy Coates	Independent	

== Election results ==
=== 2024 ===
2024 New South Wales local elections: Tamworth
Party	Candidate	Votes	%	±%
Independent	Mark Rodda (elected 1)	9,523	25.6	+7.9
Labor	1. Stephen Mears (elected 2); 2. Laura Hughes; 3. Thomas Robinson; 4. Denise McHugh; 5. Sergio Rindo	6,680	18.0	+4.4
Greens	1. Ryan Brooke (elected 9); 2. Gemma-Lea Tolmie; 3. Sewa Emojong; 4. Robin Gunning; 5. Catherine Fogarty	3,183	8.6	+8.6
Independent	Russell Webb (elected 4)	2,500	6.7	−4.1
Independent	Brendon North (elected 3)	2,246	6.0	+6.0
Independent	Jeffrey Budd (elected 5)	2,039	5.5	+5,5
Independent	Marc Sutherland (elected 8)	1,714	4.6	−5.6
Independent	Charles Impey (elected 7)	1,611	4.3	+0.8
Independent	Matt Sharpam (elected 6)	1,582	4.3	+4.3
Independent National	Bede Burke	1,573	4.2	−7.6
Independent	Judy Coates	1,474	4.0	+0.7
Independent	Ray Tait	808	2.2	−1.0
Independent National	Heidi Williamson	754	2.0	+2.0
Independent	Marie Fenn	582	1.6	+1.6
Independent National	Daniel Gillett	566	1.5	+1.5
Independent	Greg Meyer	318	0.9	+0.9
Total formal votes		37,153	92.8	+0.5
Informal votes		2,887	7.2	−0.5
Turnout		40,040	86.0	+0.1
