= Northern Daily Leader =

Daily newspaper from Tamworth, New South Wales, Australia

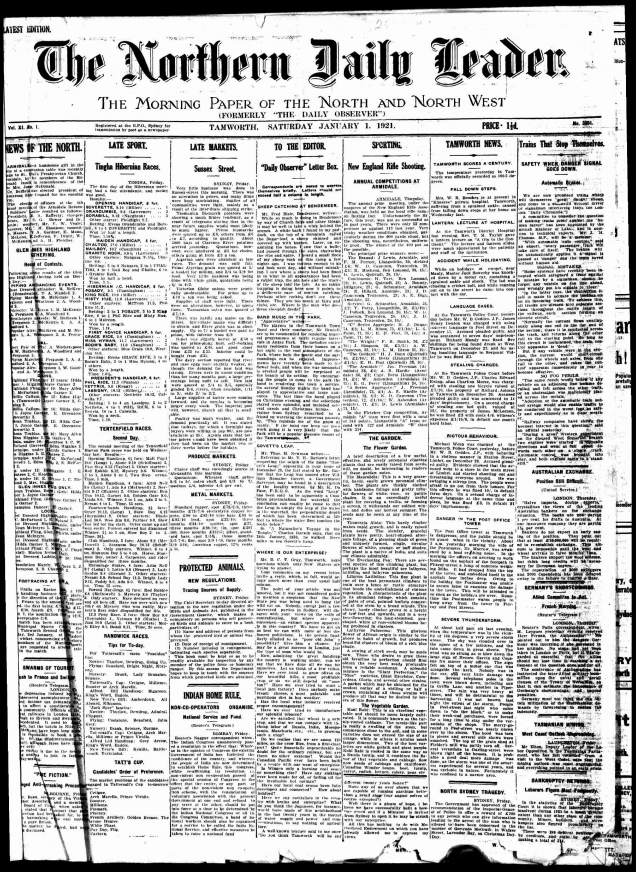
- The Northern Daily Leader, 1 January 1921
- Type: Daily newspaper
- Format: Tabloid
- Owner: Australian Community Media
- Editor: Daniel Johns
- Founded: 1876
- Headquarters: Tamworth, New South Wales, Australia
- Website: northerndailyleader.com.au

The Northern Daily Leader, previously published as The Tamworth Daily Observer, The Daily Observer and The Tamworth Observer and Northern Advertiser, is a daily newspaper produced in the city of Tamworth, New South Wales, Australia. The paper publishes stories related to the Tamworth, New England and North West Slopes regions. It also publishes stories about state and national events. Its online website also publishes many of the stories featured in the newspaper.

== History ==
The newspaper began in 1876 as semi-weekly under the title The Tamworth Observer and Northern Advertiser published by George Hooke & Joseph Smith. In 1910 it changed its name to The Tamworth Daily Observer under the new publisher Albert Joseph for his company Tamworth Newspapers Co.. Joseph had struck a deal with G A Codrington, the proprietor of the competing newspaper Tamworth News, to form one daily newspaper. Under the agreement Codrington dissolved his paper and became managing director of The Tamworth Daily Observer. The paper underwent two more changes of title under Joseph's publication, first to The Daily Observer in 1917 and then to The Northern Daily Leader in 1921, which it remains today.

In April 2026, Australian Community Media announced it would cease printing the weekday editions of the newspaper.

== Distribution ==
The Northern Daily Leader is distributed to the city and local region of Tamworth and the towns and villages of Quirindi, Walcha, Manilla, Bingara, Barraba, Nundle, Murrurundi, Gunnedah, Uralla, Werris Creek, Caroona, Willow Tree, Wallabadah, Curlewis, Kootingal, Moonbi, Attunga, Carroll, Breeza, Currabubula, Sulcor, Bective, Somerton, Duri. It has a weekly readership of 35,929.

== Digitisation ==
This newspaper has been partially digitised as part of the Australian Newspapers Digitisation Program project hosted by the National Library of Australia.

== See also ==
- List of newspapers in Australia
- List of newspapers in New South Wales
