= Somerton, New South Wales =

Somerton
- Town
- Coordinates: 30°56′S 150°38′E
- Country: Australia
- State: New South Wales
- LGA: Tamworth Regional Council
- Location: 36 km (22 mi) nw of Tamworth; 40 km (25 mi) e of Gunnedah; 25 km (16 mi) s of Manilla
- Established: 1839

Government
  - State electorate: Tamworth
  - Federal division: New England
- Elevation: 326 m (1,070 ft)

Population
  - Total: 277 (2016 census)
- Postcode: 2340
- County: Parry
- Mean max temp: 24.7 °C (76.5 °F)
- Mean min temp: 9.8 °C (49.6 °F)
- Annual rainfall: 639.9 mm (25.19 in)

Somerton is a village between Tamworth and Gunnedah on the Oxley Highway in northern New South Wales Australia. In the 2016 census, there were 277 people in Somerton. Somerton Village adjoins the plentiful Peel River.

The area surrounding Somerton is an agricultural region specialising in broad-acre cropping and large scale grazing. Lucerne is grown along the fertile Peel River flats.

Services available in Somerton include a primary school, roadhouse, hotel and memorial hall. Somerton is located close to a number of key employment hubs in the New England region, including the regional cities of Tamworth and Gunnedah.

== History ==
=== Border Police barracks ===
Initially known as Goora, the town of Somerton has a rich history, founded on the wealth of the Liverpool Plains. Somerton stands alone in the area as being a very old settlement, chosen by the first Commissioner of Crown Lands for the Liverpool Plains - Edward Mayne - as the headquarters for the vast Liverpool Plains Pastoral District in 1840. Somerton was established as the barracks for Commissioner Mayne and his contingent of Border Police troopers assigned to him to maintain order and consolidate British colonisation over the vast north western district. On 6 May 1856 notice was given that approved plans for the town of Somerton had been lodged in Tamworth, and the village of Somerton was officially divided into streets and town allotments in 1858.

=== The legacy of an ANZAC ===
David Heugh, 1914.

In the early 1900s, Somerton had two general stores, one operating as a general store and post office, and the other - on Bloomfield Street - operating as David Heugh General Stores. David Heugh, born 21 May 1890, was an ambitious and optimistic young man, with consistent marketing of his wares published in local newspapers. On 31 December 1912, Heugh suffered a serious set-back in business, when his general store burnt out completely - which was found through a Coronial Inquiry to have occurred through no fault of his own. On 22 February 1913, Heugh used newspaper advertising to optimistically notify his patrons that a new store was under construction, and he would temporarily trade from his previous premises while the new store was built. After establishing the Somerton Sports Club in 1913, and registering a company David Heugh Pty Ltd in 1914, Heugh left the new general store in the responsibility of his brother, Blandford Heugh, and enlisted in the Army on 13 September 1914. David Heugh was the first person from the New England region to lose his life in Gallipoli, dying on 29 April 1915.

The AIF Project also provides detailed insights into the following men of Somerton that served at war:

| Name | Unit Name |
|---|---|
| AVARD, Thomas Henly | 1st Light Horse Regiment, 12th Reinforcement |
| HEUGH, David McNeil | 2nd Battalion, E Company |
| WOOLLASTON, Carl John | Western Australian Reinforcement 3 |
| CHAFFEY, Ernest Alfred | 1st Machine Gun Company, 13th Reinforcements |
| FAY, Thomas Vincent | 1st Light Horse Regiment, 5th Reinforcement |
| FRANKLIN, John | 17th Battalion, C Company |
| MULLER, Clarence Amos | 33rd Battalion, B Company |
| WOOD, Henry Samuel | 33rd Battalion, 1st Reinforcement |
| WOOLASTON, Wilfred Ayles | 4th Battalion, 12th Reinforcement |
| WOOLASTON, Harold John | Median Trench Mortar Div, First to enlist in the region. |
| WOOLASTON, Reginald Peel. | |

== Recreation and natural environment ==
Somerton is close to a range of popular recreation facilities, including Keepit Dam and Somerton National Park.

Keepit Dam is a popular inland sport and recreation destination, offering year-round attractions for water sports and fishing enthusiasts, nature lovers, bushwalkers, campers and picnickers. The lake foreshores are home to a popular holiday park and a NSW Sport and Recreation Centre. The main purpose of the dam is to supply irrigation, stock and household needs in the Namoi Valley, although it is an extremely popular weekend destination for Tamworth and Gunnedah residents.

== Rich soils and plentiful aquifers ==
Schematic drawing of the Gunnedah and Narrabri aquifer formations

Somerton village is unique in the area as it sits squarely on the high-yielding Gunnedah and Narrabri aquifer formations. The Gunnedah aquifer formation sits above the bedrock and contains coarse sands and gravel with particularly high hydraulic conductivity - acting as the main conduit for groundwater west under the Liverpool Plains. The Narrabri aquifer formation caps the Gunnedah aquifer, and hydraulic conductivity is typically lower than that of the Gunnedah formation. Groundwater use in the Gunnedah Basin area totals some 1,260 gigalitres (280×10^{9} imp gal; 330×10^{9} US gal) mostly drawn from the high-yielding alluvial aquifers that exist from the Liverpool Plains to west of Narrabri. The bulk of this water is used for irrigation, with only small percentages used for town water supply and mining and an even smaller volume used for stock and domestic purposes.

Somerton is surrounded by good cropping and pastoral land, and as a convict settlement in the 1800s, was also home to a large orchard on the river flats with the final tree from the original orchard falling in the 1910 flood. In about 1910 the district around Somerton had 7,854 hectares (19,408 acres) of wheat which produced 273,906 bushel of wheat, with reports suggesting incredible growth and diversification was happening at the time. Somerton's location at the gateway to the very highly productive Liverpool Plains places it among some of Australia's finest broadacre rural lands.

== See also ==
- Somerton General Cemetery
