= New England (New South Wales) =

- Region
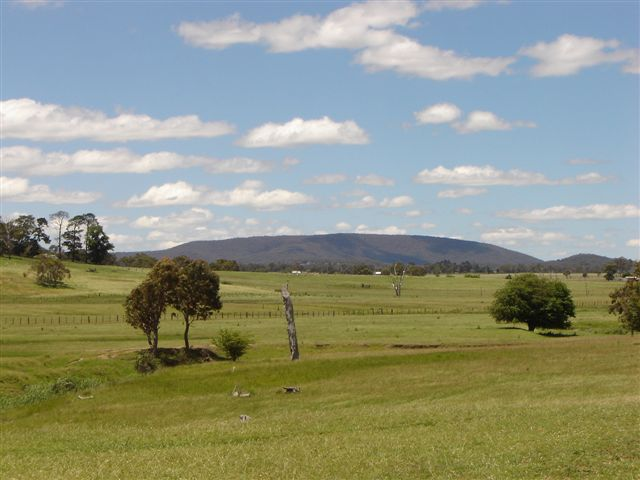
- View of Mount Duval with farms in the foreground

- Coordinates: 30°28′S 150°58′E
- Country: Australia
- State: New South Wales
- LGA: Armidale Regional Council; Glen Innes Severn; Inverell Shire; Tamworth Regional Council; Tenterfield Shire; Walcha Shire

Government
  - State electorates: Northern Tablelands; Tamworth
  - Federal division: New England

Area
  - Total: 46,205 km^{2} (17,840 sq mi)

Population
  - Total: 185,160 (2021)
  - Density: 4.00736/km^{2} (10.3790/sq mi)
- Time zone: UTC+10 (AEST)
  - Summer (DST): UTC+11 (AEDT)
Regions around New England
North West Slopes	South Downs	Northern Rivers
North West Slopes	New England	Mid North Coast
Upper Hunter	Hunter	Mid North Coast

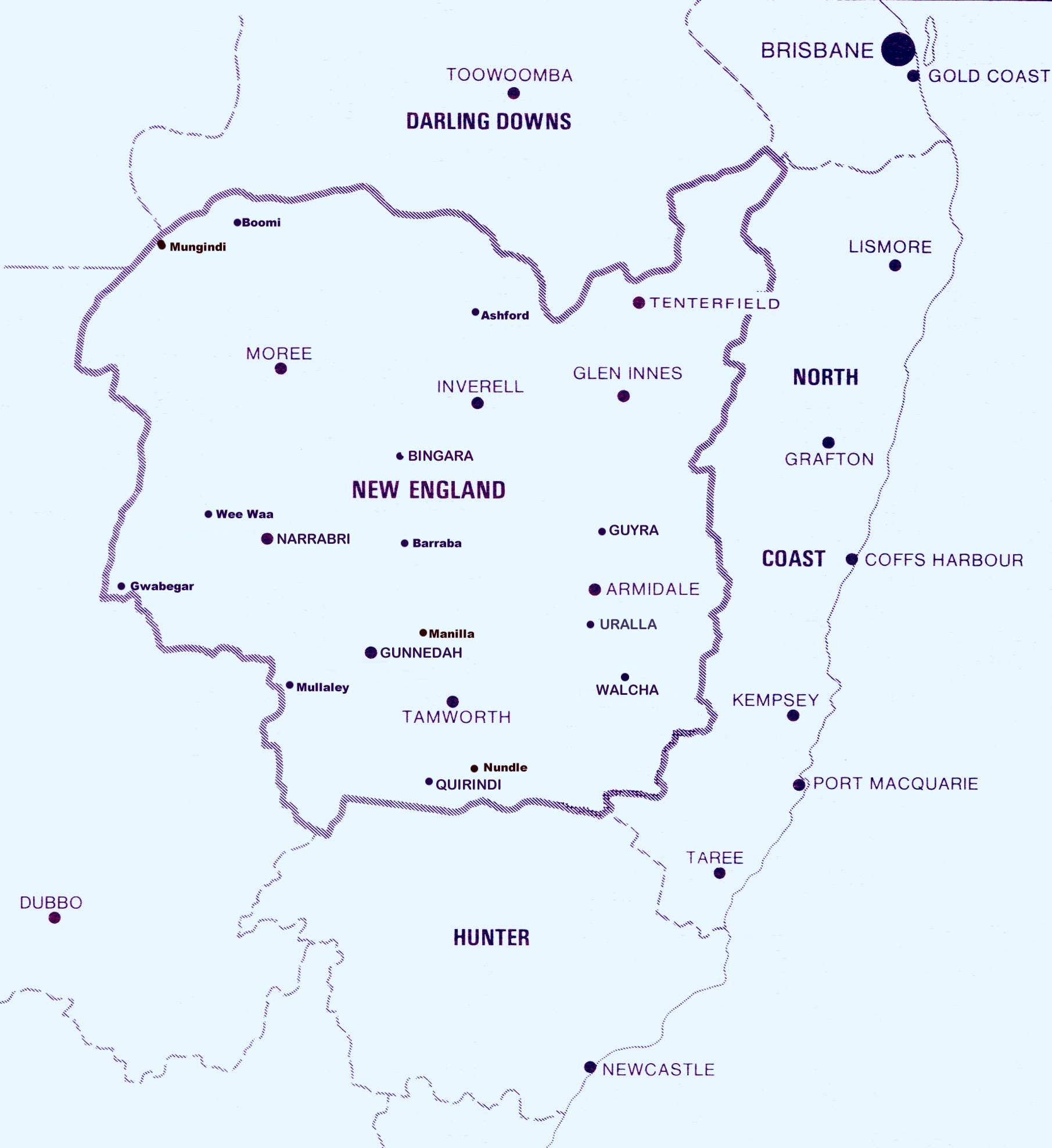
Approximate boundaries of the New England North West region within New South Wales

New England is a geographical region in the north of the state of New South Wales, Australia, about 60 km (37 mi) inland from the Tasman Sea. The area includes the Northern Tablelands (or New England Tablelands) and the North West Slopes regions. As of 2021, New England had a population of 185,560, with over a quarter of the people living in the area of Tamworth Regional Council.

== History ==
The region has been occupied by Indigenous Australians for tens of thousands of years, in the west by the Kamilaroi people. In the highlands, the original languages (which are now extinct) included Anaiwan to the south of Guyra and Ngarbal to the north of Guyra. The population of the tablelands has been estimated to be 1,100 to 1,200 at the time of colonisation – quite low in comparison to the Liverpool Plains and Gwydir River region, estimated to be 4,500 to 5,500. Conflict, disease and environmental damage caused the tablelands population to be reduced to 400 by the 1890s.

The first European to explore the New England area was English explorer John Oxley, who crossed the southern part of the New England Range near the Apsley Falls before he discovered and named Port Macquarie in 1818. In 1827 Allan Cunningham travelled north along the western edge of the Range until he reached the Darling Downs in Queensland. In 1831 Thomas Mitchell reached Wallamoul Station near Tamworth and explored to the Namoi River then followed it to Narrabri. Moving on, Mitchell found a deep, broad river which was the Gwydir. In 1832, Mitchell cut across the plains to the Gwydir River near Moree. The team then spent several weeks charting the tributaries between the Gwydir and the Barwon Rivers.

Hamilton Collins Sempill was the first settler in the New England area when he took up the 'Wolka' run in 1832, establishing slab huts where 'Langford' now stands close to Walcha. During the 1830s further squatters moved their sheep flocks onto the Northern Tablelands as they had been displaced by the Australian Agricultural Company, which dominated resources in the Hunter Valley. When the area was opened up for settlement in the 1830s, this led to the gazetting of nine pastoral districts. These districts had a small police force and a Commissioner of Crown Lands.

Australian red cedar (Toona ciliata) cutters moved into the headwaters of the Macleay River in the early 1830s to harvest the valuable trees. The ranges between Kempsey and Glen Innes yielded about 300,000 board feet (710 m^{3}) in 1950.

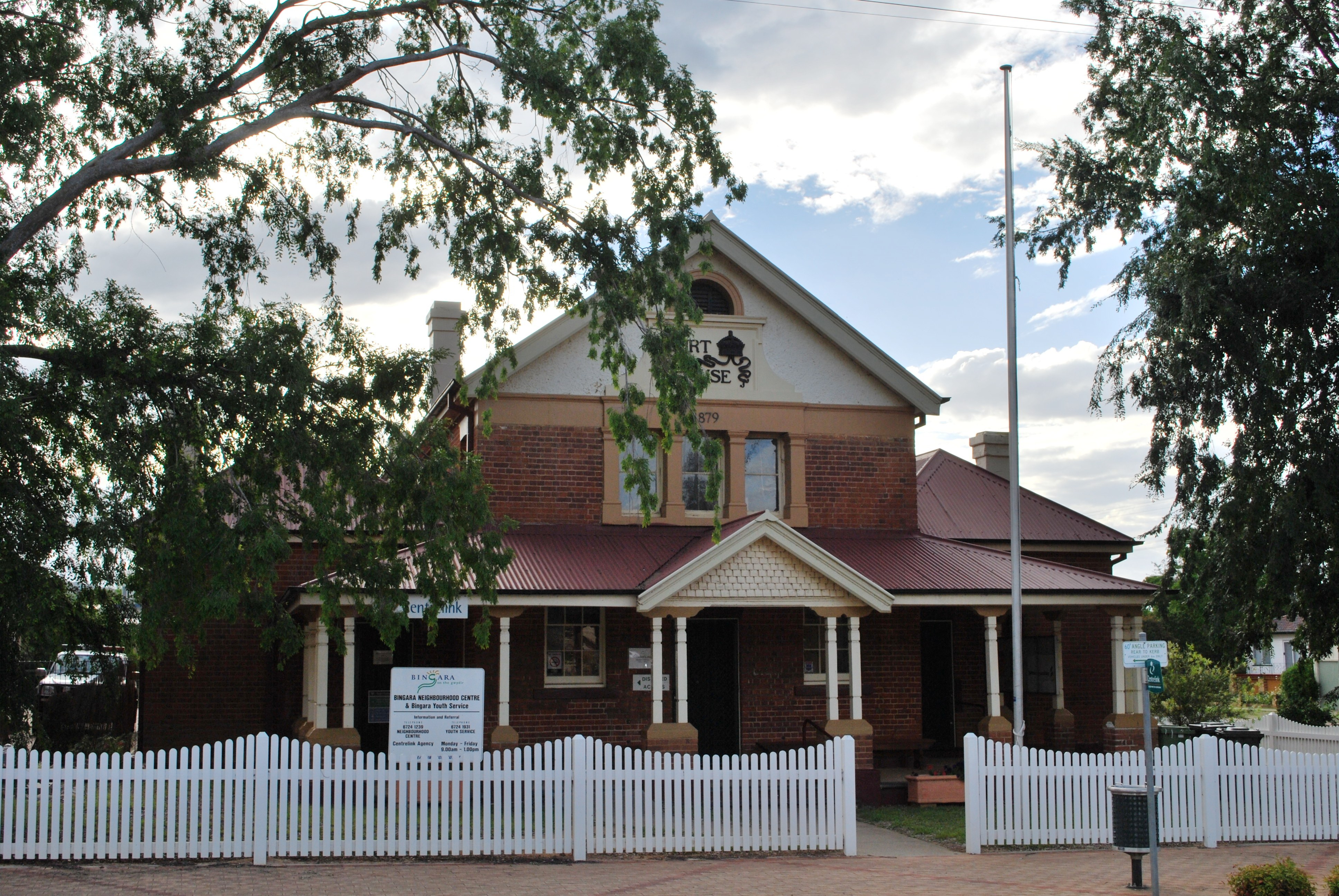
Bingara Court House in the town of Bingara

Work commenced in 1838 with the use of convicts to build a road, then known as Major's Line, across the Great Dividing Range to link the wool-growing settlement of Walcha with Port Macquarie. This road was later named the Oxley Highway.

On 22 May 1839 the New England District was gazetted thus: New England District: Bounded on the east by a line north by compass from the top of Werrikimber Mountain which is at the head of the Hastings River; on the south by a line west by compass from the top of Werrikimber Mountain to the Great Dividing Range; on the west by the western extreme of the Great Dividing Range so as to include the Tableland and on the north the boundary is indefinite.

In 1840 there were 66 separate pastoral licences, in 1842 it rose to 98, 1845 – 116; and by 1848 there were 132. Only 10 new runs were registered between 1848 and 1855. In 1843 the Darling Downs district was separated from the New England.

This region ceased to be a statistical division after 1874, but the counties of Arrawatta, Clarke, Clive, Gough, Hardinge, Hawes, Sandon and Vernon approximated the region's limits. In 1847 these counties, with the exception of Hawes and Vernon formed part of the "Unsettled District" of the colony. By 1850 all major communication routes had been forged, with little government assistance.

During the 1860s the famous bushranger, Captain Thunderbolt, robbed properties, mail coaches and hotels throughout the region. Thunderbolt was shot dead in May 1870 by Constable Walker at Kentucky Creek, near Uralla.

The population of the New England Region, including the slopes in 1957 was 143,788 and in 1971 there were 164,128 people, according to the census data. In the 2006 census the New England region had a population of 180,000 which included the local government areas of Armidale Dumaresq, Inverell, Walcha, Glen Innes Severn, Gunnedah, Guyra, Gwydir, Liverpool Plains, Moree Plains, Narrabri, Tamworth Regional and Uralla.

=== Mining ===
Gold was discovered in 1851 at Rocky River, approximately two kilometres west of Uralla and started a rush to the area. Then gold was found at Hanging Rock and nearby Swamp Creek in 1852. In the early 1850s some alluvial gold was found at Mulla Creek and Rywung (now Weabonga) on Swamp Oak Creek. In 1852 the first licenses to prospect were taken out. In the late 19th century several gold and antimony mines were established at places such as Halls Peak and Hillgrove, as well as two ambitious hydro-electric schemes to power them, the remains of which can be seen today along the Styx River and at Gara Gorge. The first gold mining was recorded at Tia in 1866 and in 1873 a reef was discovered at McLeod's Creek, near Walcha. The discovery of the Torrington Tin Lode was made in 1881 but the small prospectors soon lost control to overseas mining companies. Tin and arsenic were mined from the 1880s at the Ottery Mine, near Emmaville. Copper was discovered at Gulf Creek, near Barraba, in 1889 and the first mine was established there in 1892. At its peak, in 1901, the copper mine was one of the largest in the state. Asbestos was first mined at Woodsreef, also near Barraba, from 1919 to the 1980s.

Mining had a major influence on the rise and fall of other towns and villages such as, Bingara, Bear Hill, Elsmore, Emmaville, Metz, Nundle, Stannifer, Tingha and Torrington.

=== Railway service ===
Construction of the Northern Tablelands railway service commenced in the 1870s and the Main North railway line reached Werris Creek and west Tamworth in 1878, Armidale in 1883 and Wallangarra on the Queensland border in 1888. The Main North railway line is now closed north of Armidale.

The Mungindi railway line from Werris Creek to Gunnedah opened in 1879, Narrabri in 1884, Moree in 1897, and Mungindi in 1914. The line is currently truncated to Weemelah between Moree and Mungindi. The line between Werris Creek and Moree is also known as the North-West line. A branch line was opened from Moree to Inverell in 1901. This line was closed in 1994. A branch line was opened between Camurra (11 km north of Moree) to North Star and Boggabilla in 1932 but it is now closed beyond North Star. Another branch was opened from Narrabri to Burren Junction in 1903.

=== Natural disasters ===
The major weather events in the region were:

- June 1950 – 1 person drowned in the flooded Barwon River, and 250,000 sheep were lost in the Moree area.
- October 1950 – 2 drowned in the Namoi area.
- February 1955 – nearly every home in Narrabri was flooded.
- February 1956 – 1 drowned in the flooded Peel River
- January 1962 – Walcha's worst flood when 40 business houses and 39 residences were inundated.
- February 1971 – 5 killed, $25 million damage to stock and crops in the flooded Namoi area.
- January 1974 – Namoi flood area: $4 million property damage, $45 m roads and bridges. 500,000 sheep lost, worth $23m. $15m crop losses. $3 million beef cattle loss.
- September 1996 – A severe storm, with strong winds, heavy rain and hail, hit Armidale and caused widespread damage.
- November 2000 – The worst floods in half a century devastated Gunnedah, Narrabri and Wee Waa.
- November 2008 – Devastating damage occurred in the Tamworth, Somerton, Gunnedah and Weabonga areas after flash flooding.

== New England and its boundaries ==
New England has no clearly defined boundaries, and the term has several possible definitions. These boundaries also vary according to the units responsible for services, including county councils, local government areas, electorates and the Livestock Health and Pest Authority (formerly the Pastures Protection Boards) etc. The New England region does not have a Bureau of Meteorology forecast as such, but the whole of the Northern Tablelands and part of the North West Slopes and Plains forecasts cover this region.

New England's major settlements are Tenterfield, Inverell, Glen Innes, Moree, Armidale, Narrabri, Tamworth, Gunnedah, Quirindi and Wee Waa. Of these, Tamworth and Armidale are the major commercial areas, both with large shopping centres and tourist attractions. Of these, Inverell and Moree are considered semi-major towns.

The narrowest and most common definition of New England consists of the Northern Tablelands highland area which forms part of the Great Dividing Range, from the Moonbi Range in the south to the border of Queensland in the north. This tableland region is about 320 kilometres (200 mi) long by approximately 130 kilometres (81 mi) wide. It includes substantial areas more than 900 metres (3,000 ft) above sea-level, with a distinctive cold climate and distinctive vegetation.

This highland region is often referred to as the New England Tableland, New England Plateau, or Northern Tablelands. There are widespread peaks over 1,000 metres (3,300 ft) and the highest point at Round Mountain is 1,585 metres (5,200 ft) above sea level. Other key peaks include Point Lookout at 1,564 metres (5,131 ft), Ben Lomond at 1,512 metres (4,961 ft), Mount Grundy at 1,463 metres (4,800 ft), Mount Hyland at 1,434 metres (4,705 ft), and Mount Duval at 1,393 metres (4,570 ft).

This definition of "New England" includes the towns and districts of Tenterfield, Glen Innes, Guyra, Inverell, Armidale and Walcha.

A broader definition of the New England Region covering 98,574 square kilometres (38,060 sq mi), includes areas beyond the highlands which can also be considered to be the North West Slopes region and the Liverpool Plains. This definition is frequently known as New England North West or less commonly the Northern Region or Northern Inland Region and includes the western valleys of the Gwydir River and Namoi River and their tributaries, and the foothills and spur ranges which generally form the western side of the central Northern Tablelands. Towns and districts such as Moree, Narrabri, Gunnedah, the city of Tamworth and Quirindi, are included in the New England region according to this basis. Smaller towns include, Manilla, Barraba, Bingara, Boggabri, Mungindi, Wee Waa and Werris Creek.

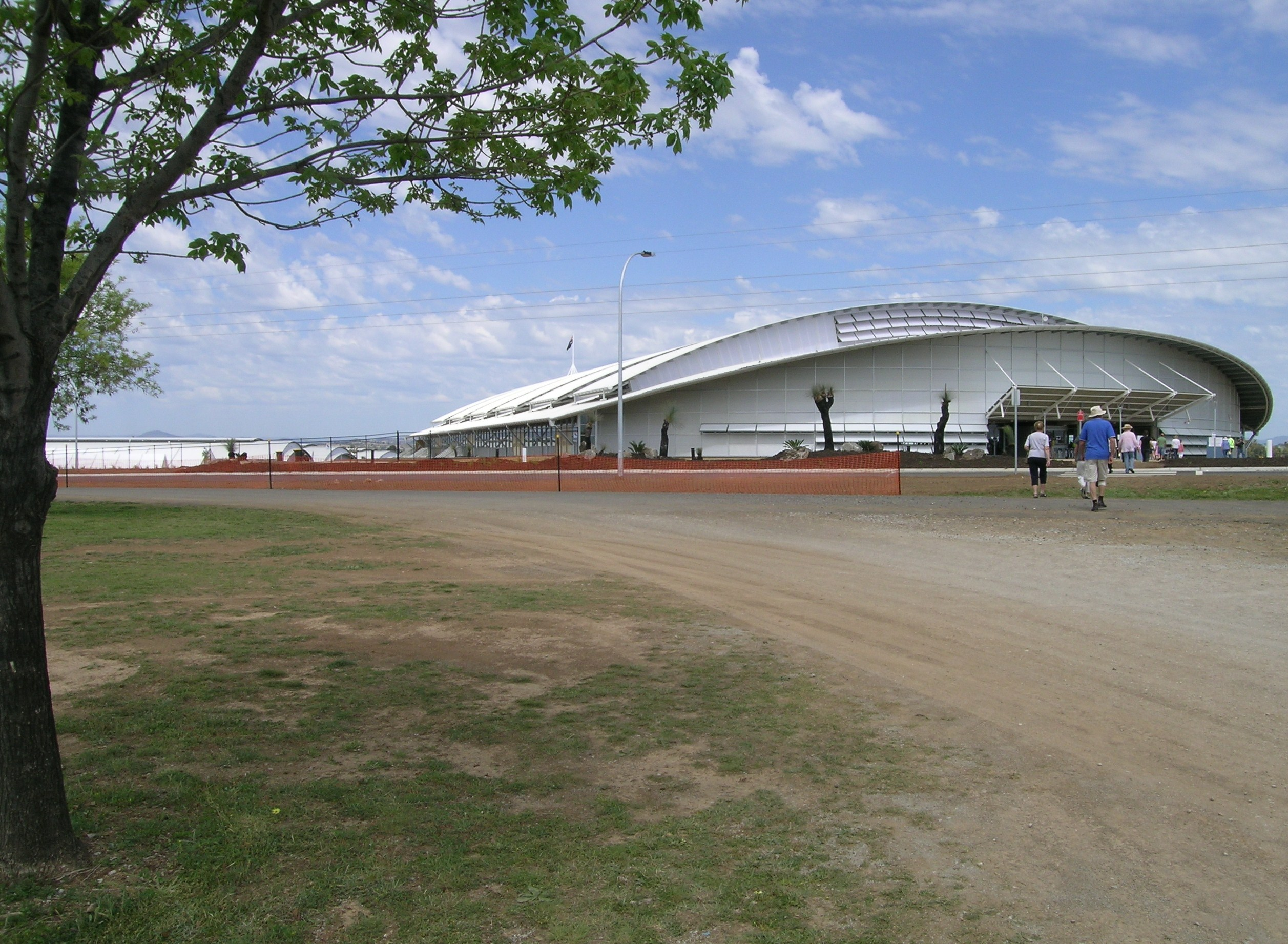
The Australian Equine and Livestock Events Centre

The two traditional centres of New England are Tamworth and Armidale. Armidale is home to the University of New England, one of Australia's oldest universities. It also has large shopping centres and is the second largest city in the region. Tamworth is the bigger of the two, and is now best known as the centre of Australian country music and the home of the Australian Equine and Livestock Events Centre (AELEC) and Tamworth Regional Entertainment Centre (TREC). Other major towns and districts of New England include Narrabri, Moree, Glen Innes, Inverell, Tenterfield, Gunnedah and Walcha.

At its broadest definition, during the New England New State Movement the New England Region included the northern coastal lowlands of New South Wales, known as the Mid North Coast and Northern Rivers region, and including cities such as Lismore and Grafton. Several proposals were made for a new Australian state of New England and this included the North Coast region in the boundaries. Apart from this usage, the Mid North Coast and Northern Rivers region are not considered to be part of New England.

Police stations in New England Local Area Command (LAC) are Armidale, Ashford, Bundarra, Deepwater, Delungra, Emmaville, Glen Innes, Guyra, Inverell, Tenterfield, Tingha, Uralla and Yetman. Bendemeer, Nowendoc, Walcha and Walcha Road are in the Oxley LAC.

== Geography and ecology ==
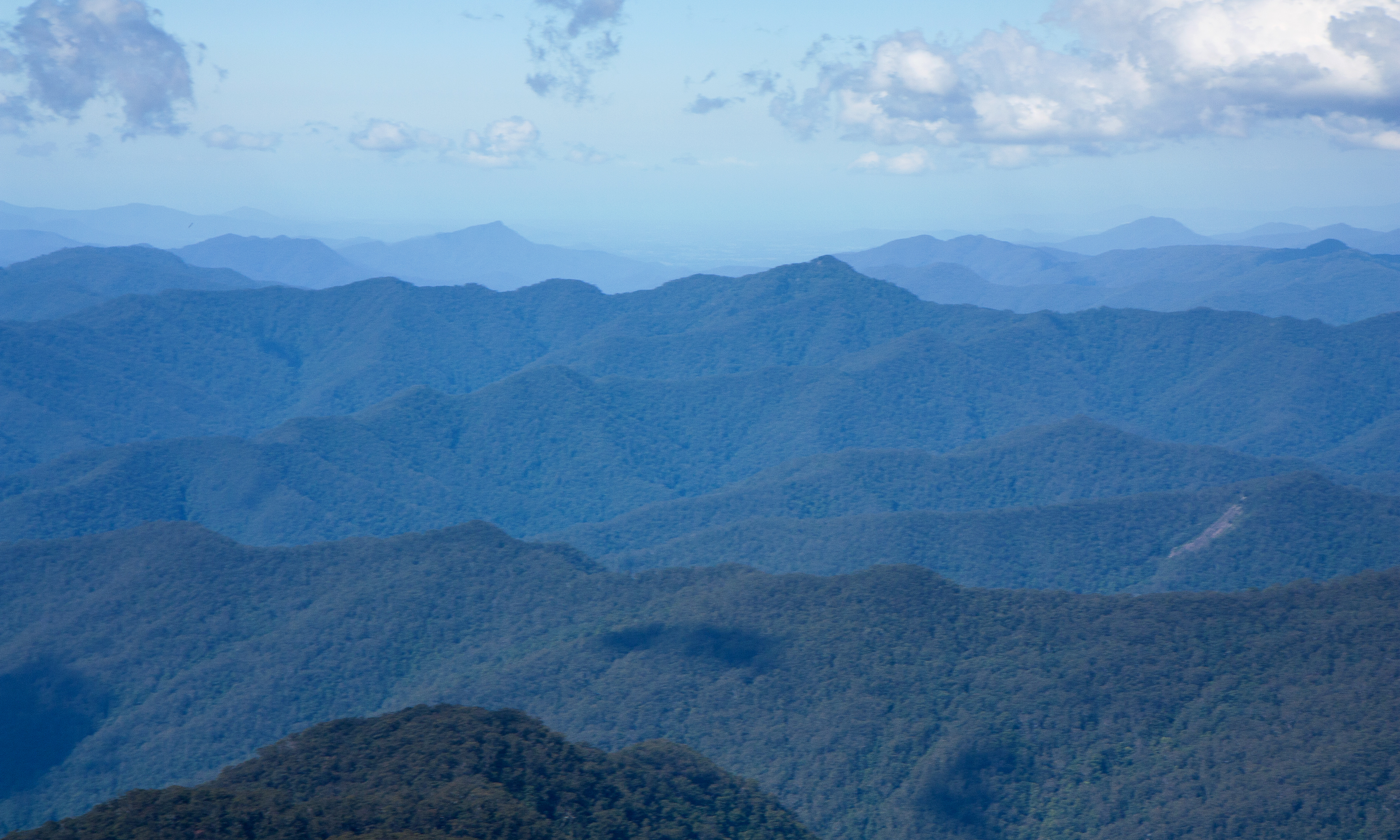
Point Lookout, New England National Park, NSW

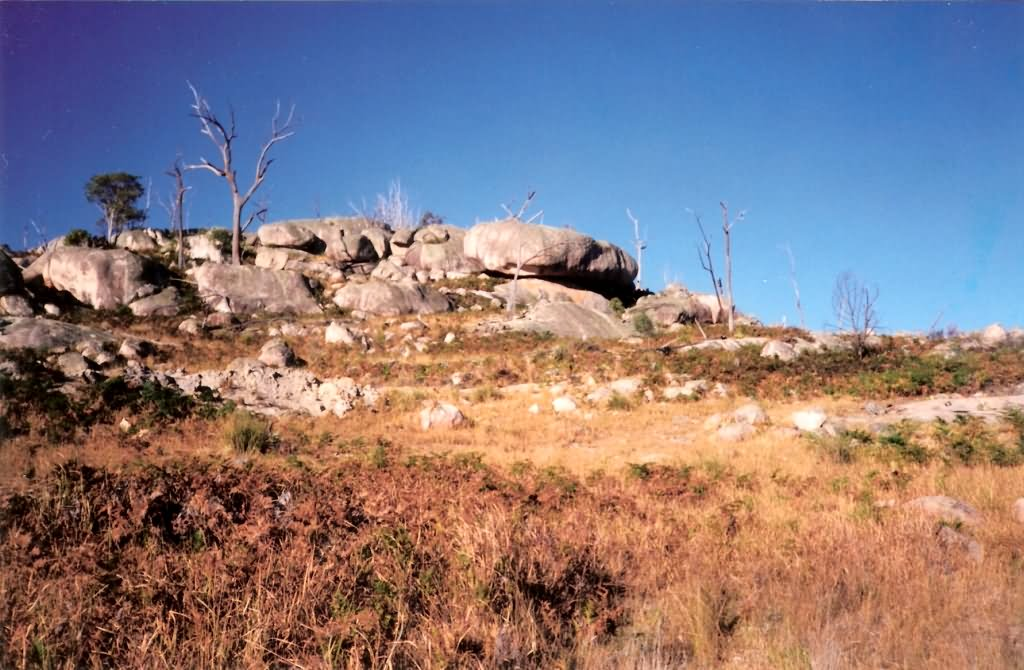
Rocky ridges like this are scattered across the New England landscape.

The topography of the region is dominated by the Northern Tablelands plateau. The eastern side of the plateau is drained by the various headwaters and tributaries of the Clarence River, Hastings River and the Macleay River. The eastern rivers are short and swift, and in many places form deep gorges and waterfalls. Notable waterfalls include the Apsley Falls at Walcha plus the Ebor Falls and Wollomombi Falls which are on Waterfall Way east of Armidale. These gorges fragment the eastern side of the plateau, which in some areas such as New England National Park and Point Lookout are quite close to the coast. There are many National Parks along the rugged eastern fringes of the highlands including Cathedral Rock National Park, which has the region's highest peak, and Nymboida National Park.

The western side of the plateau is somewhat less rugged, and is drained towards the west by the tributaries of the Severn River, the Gwydir River and the Namoi River. These rivers form part of the Murray-Darling Basin. There are large dams at Copeton Dam on the Gwydir and at Keepit Dam, Chaffey Dam and Split Rock Dam in the Namoi catchment, plus Pindari Dam on the Severn River. The Nandewar Range is a major western spur of the highlands, culminating in Mount Kaputar near Narrabri.

The hilltops of the Great Dividing Range are basalt from north of Uralla to Glen Innes, and the eastern slopes are the lighter "trap" soils. On the western slopes near Bendemeer, Bundarra, Kentucky and Tenterfield the country is granite, with extensive sandy loams. The New England Peppermint Grassy Woodland lies within the region.

The New England lies in the temperate zone, and the climate is generally free from extremes of heat and cold. The greatest heat is usually experienced in the north-west around Narrabri and Mungindi. Winter frosts are common on the Northern Tablelands and winter snow is not unusual in this area. The Northern Tablelands receives most of its rain between late summer and early autumn with an annual average rainfall of about 800 mm, with the eastern escarpment having falls of around 2,000 mm average.

=== Flora ===
Wattles (Acacias), native apples (Angophora floribunda), black sallee (Eucalyptus stellulata), Blakely's red gum (Eucalyptus blakelyi), Hillgrove box (Eucalyptus retinens), New England blackbutt (Eucalyptus andrewsii), broadleaved New England stringybark (Eucalyptus caliginosa), manna gum (Eucalyptus viminalis), New England peppermint (Eucalyptus nova-anglica), ribbon gum (Eucalyptus nobilis), silvertop stringybark (Eucalyptus laevopinea) wild cherry and yellow box (Eucalyptus melliodora) and stringybark (Eucalyptus caliginosa) trees are common across the Northern Tablelands. The river oak (Casuarina cunninghamiana) grows along many creeks and river beds on the eastern and western slopes.

Bolivia Hill and the adjacent nature reserve are the only recorded locations of the endangered Bolivia Hill boronia (Boronia boliviensis), Bolivia homoranthus (Homoranthus croftianthus), Bolivia Stringybark (Eucalyptus boliviana), the shrub Bolivia Hill Pimelea (Pimelea venosa) and the vulnerable Bolivia wattle (Acacia pycnostchya). The rare Hillgrove spotted gum (Eucalyptus michaeliana) can be found near Hillgrove and in parts of the Oxley Wild Rivers National Park.

On the Western Slopes Caley's ironbark (Eucalyptus caleyi), McKie's stringybark (Eucalyptus mckiena), red stringybark (Eucalyptus macrorhynca), river red gums (Eucalyptus camaldulensis), rough-barked apple (Angophora), silver-leaved ironbark (Eucalyptus melanophloia nophloia), tumbledown gum (Eucalyptus dealbata), white box (Eucalyptus albens) and white cypress pine (callitris columellaris) are commonly found.

Some of the invasive weeds and plants found in the New England region include:

- Blackberry (Rubus fruticosus), competes with desirable pastures and harbours pest animals.
- Bracken competes with desirable pastures and causes toxicity to stock.
- Lantana (Lantana camara), invades the bushland
- Mother of millions (Kalanchoe delagoensis) causes severe toxicity to stock
- Nodding thistle (Carduus nutans)
- Patterson's curse (Echium plantagineum) competes with desirable pastures and causes toxicity to stock.
- Saffron thistle (Carthamus lanatus)
- Serrated tussock (Nassella trichotoma), competes with desirable pastures
- St John's wort (Hypericum perforatum) competes with desirable pastures and causes toxicity to stock.

=== Fauna ===
Common animals that may be encountered across the New England region include: kangaroos, echidnas, wallabies, possums and wombats. Common birds are: cockatoos, currawongs, magpies, crows, wild ducks, galahs, parrots, kookaburras, ravens, rosellas and emus (on the western slopes). Snakes, lizards, jacky dragons (Amphibolurus muricatus) and goannas may also be encountered.

Endangered species that may be seen include the brush-tailed rock-wallaby (Petrogale penicillata) which may be spotted in isolated sections of Oxley Wild Rivers National Park. Bundarra is one of only three breeding areas in New South Wales for the endangered regent honeyeater. Werrikimbe National Park is the home of the rare (native) Hastings River mouse which was considered to be extinct until it was re-discovered in 1981. The Namoi River snapping turtle (Elseya belli) is a species of turtle found only in the upper reaches of the Namoi River, Gwydir River and Macdonald River.

The area is also known to have supported vast populations of Australian megafauna.

Pest animals in the New England region include, foxes, rabbits, feral goats and feral pigs.

== Economy ==
The New England region has a great diversity of mineral deposits ranging from large coal deposits in the Werris Creek to Boggabri area to metallics and gemstones on the tablelands. Antimony, coal, gold, sapphires and tin have been the most important economic commodities mined in the New England region.

There are numerous other business activities across the region ranging from small enterprises to large multi-national corporations that are producing goods for domestic and international markets. Aviation training is provided by the Tamworth-based BAE Systems flight training college, the Australasian-Pacific Aeronautical College.

Cattle and sheep are the predominant types of livestock produced in the New England and they have been produced since their importation during the earliest days of European settlement. The Northern Tablelands produce some of Australia's best fine wool and beef cattle. The western slopes are major areas for cotton and wheat. Other primary production activities include dairying, the production of grains, lamb, pork, fruit, potatoes, poultry, eggs, various mining activities, timber production, viticulture and aquaculture.

== Transport and communications ==
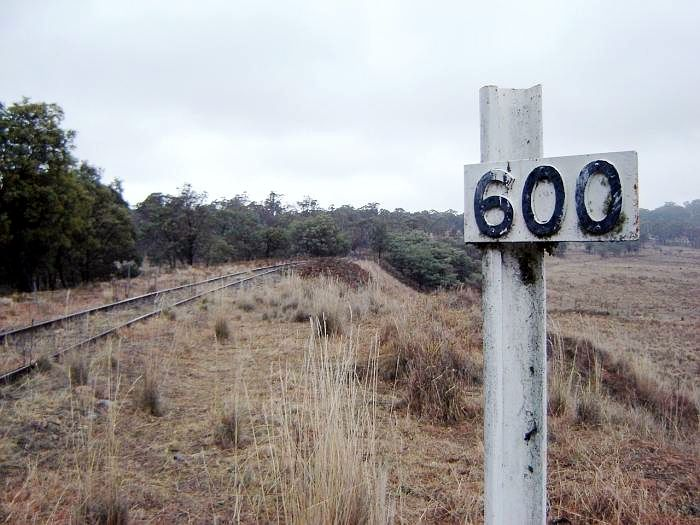
Abandoned railway north of Armidale

The New England region is traversed by five major highways and a concentrated network of minor roads. On the tablelands the New England Highway, which links Tamworth, Uralla, Armidale, Guyra, Glen Innes and Tenterfield is a major route linking New South Wales and Queensland. The Newell Highway is a major route linking Victoria and Queensland through Narrabri and Moree. Thunderbolts Way from Gloucester provides the shortest route from Sydney to the New England and continues through Walcha, Uralla and Bundarra to Inverell. The Oxley Highway, Gwydir Highway, the scenic Waterfall Way and Bruxner Highway traverse the New England region from west to east. On Western Slopes the Kamilaroi Highway runs in a north-western direction for 620 km, from Willow Tree passing through Quirindi, Gunnedah, Narrabri and Wee Waa until it reaches Bourke. Fossickers Way is a tourist route that runs from Nundle to Warialda in the north and then east to Inverell and Glen Innes passing through some rich gem areas.

The major towns have air, coach and rail services that supplement the road network. The Main North railway line following the same route as the New England Highway to Wallangarra, Queensland was the first railway link between the states, however the coastal railway is now used and the New England line is disused north of Armidale. There is a daily passenger service from and to Sydney which extends to Moree in the north west and Armidale in the north. The train divides at Werris Creek.

Armidale Airport and Tamworth Airport are the region's main two airports which provides daily domestic flights to Sydney and Brisbane that are operated by QantasLink and Link Airways.

== Media ==
=== Radio ===
Radio stations that broadcast to the region are ABC New England North West, 2TM, 2YOU, and 2ARM.

=== Television ===
TV stations the broadcast to the region are:

- Seven (formerly branded as Prime7), 7two, 7mate, 7flix, 7Bravo – Seven Network owned and operated channels.
- Nine (NBN), 9Go!, 9Gem, 9Life – Nine Network owned and operated channels.
- 10, 10 Drama, 10 Comedy – Network 10 owned and operated channels.
- ABC, ABC Family, ABC Kids, ABC Entertains and ABC News, part of the Australian Broadcasting Corporation.
- Special Broadcasting Service, SBS, SBS Viceland, SBS Food, SBS WorldWatch, SBS World Movies and NITV.

== Education ==
The New England region has a comprehensive range of educational facilities available, including 125 public schools.

Armidale is the home of the University of New England, Australia's oldest regional university and was the location of the former Armidale Teachers College. Other Armidale schools include, New England Girls' School (NEGS), The Armidale School (TAS), Armidale Secondary College, O'Connor Catholic College and Presbyterian Ladies' College. Calala, near Tamworth, is the home of Farrer Memorial Agricultural High School, a public high school for boys. Calrossy Anglican School, Oxley High School, Peel High School, Tamworth High School and Tamworth Public School are the other principal schools that are located in Tamworth.

The New England Institute of TAFE has campuses in Tamworth, Armidale, Boggabilla, Glen Innes, Gunnedah, Inverell, Moree, Narrabri, Quirindi and Tenterfield.

== Health services ==
On 25 August 2000, the New England North West Westpac Rescue Helicopter Service (WRHS) commenced operation after four years of fundraising and planning. The New England North West WRHS operates 24 hours a day, 7 days a week with an annual average of 130 missions.

== National parks ==
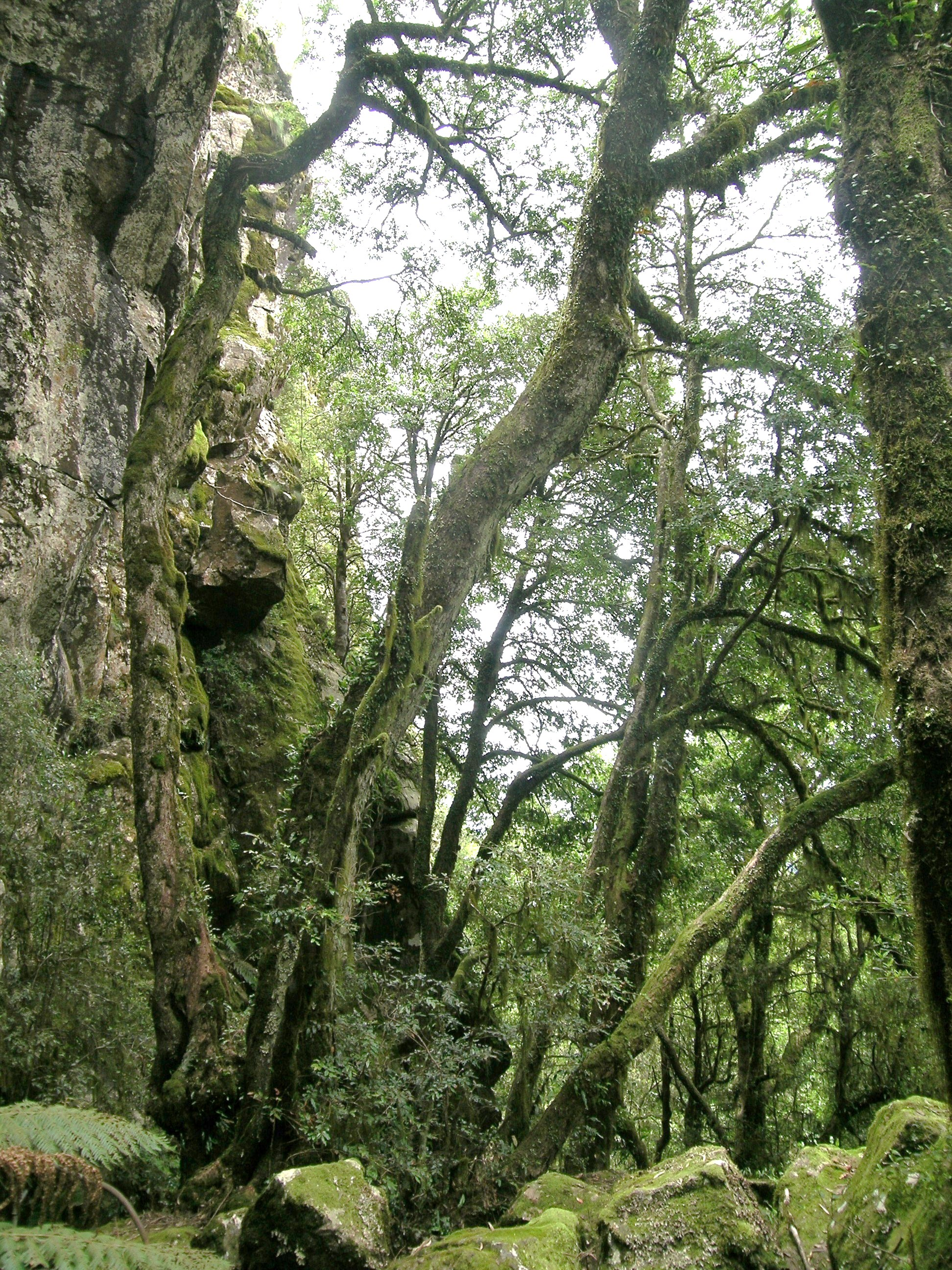
Moss covered trees and rocks on the Weeping Rock track in the New England National Park

There is a wide range of 27 main national parks and over 30 nature reserves in the New England area of the NSW National Parks and Wildlife Service region, plus Mount Kaputar National Park which is in the Central Region. National parks including World Heritage listed areas that form part of the Central Eastern Rainforest Reserves (CERRA), gorge country and wild rivers on the rugged eastern fringe of the region include:

- Cathedral Rock National Park which includes the highest peak in the region, Round Mountain
- Guy Fawkes River National Park
- New England National Park
- Oxley Wild Rivers National Park
- Washpool National Park
- Werrikimbe National Park

== New State Movement ==
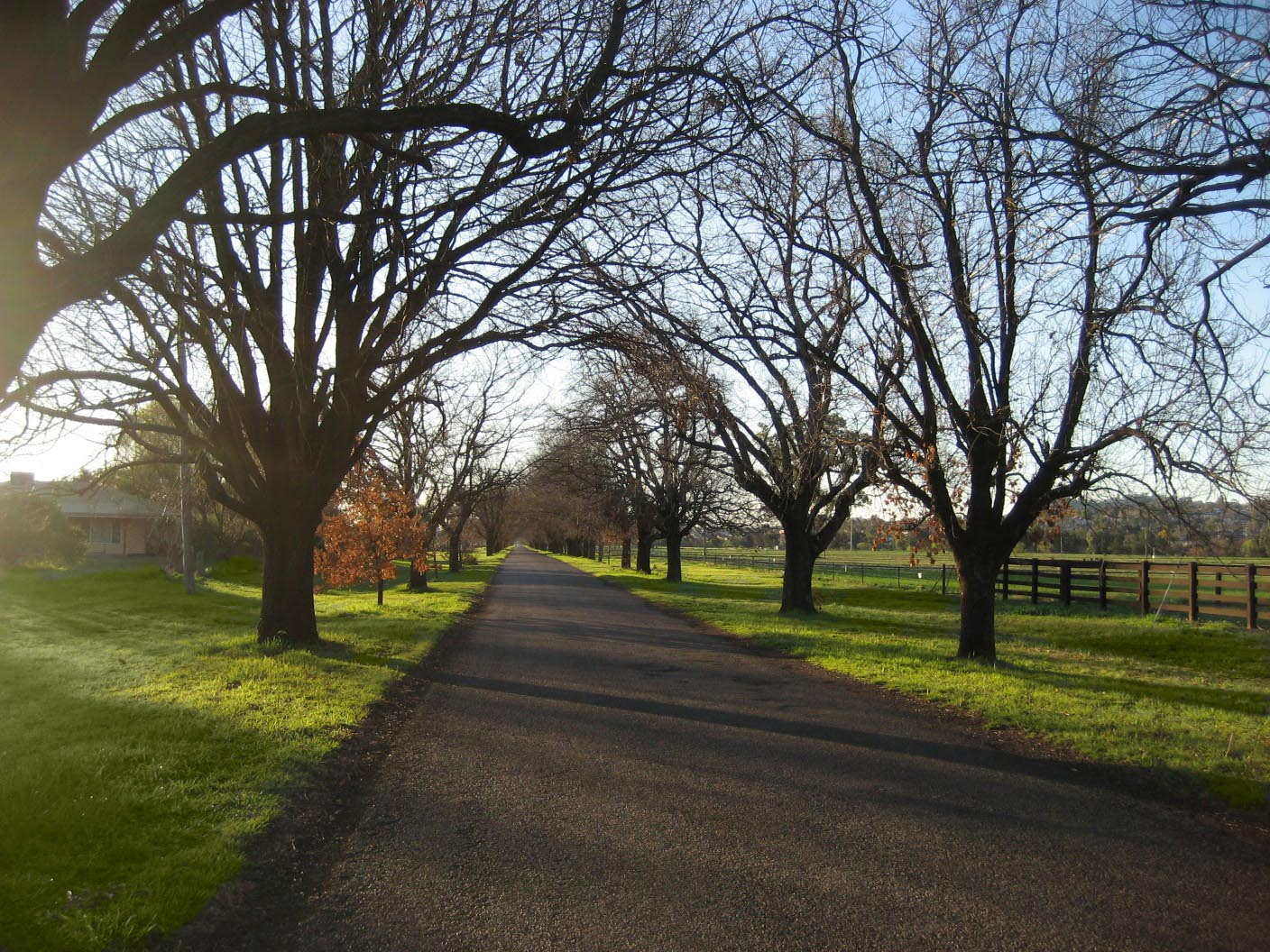
The New England Countryside: King George Avenue in Tamworth

New England has been the home of Australia's most persistent attempt to form a new state within the Australian commonwealth. In the 1930s and again in the 1960s, the New England New State Movement campaigned for New England to be separated from New South Wales. The movement was closely allied with the Country Party, which could have expected to form the government of such a new state.

On 29 April 1967, a referendum in the region on the creation of a new state in northern NSW returned a 'no' vote of 54%, although the forced inclusion of the City of Newcastle, which is not a part of New England, was the major contributing factor that led to the 'no' vote.

Chapter VI of the Constitution of Australia allows new states to be formed, but only with the consent of the Parliament of the state in question.

== See also ==
- Division of New England
- Electoral district of Northern Tablelands
- List of regions in Australia
- Northern Tablelands, New South Wales
- Robertson Land Acts
