= Fossickers Way =

Highway in New South Wales

Fossickers Way New South Wales
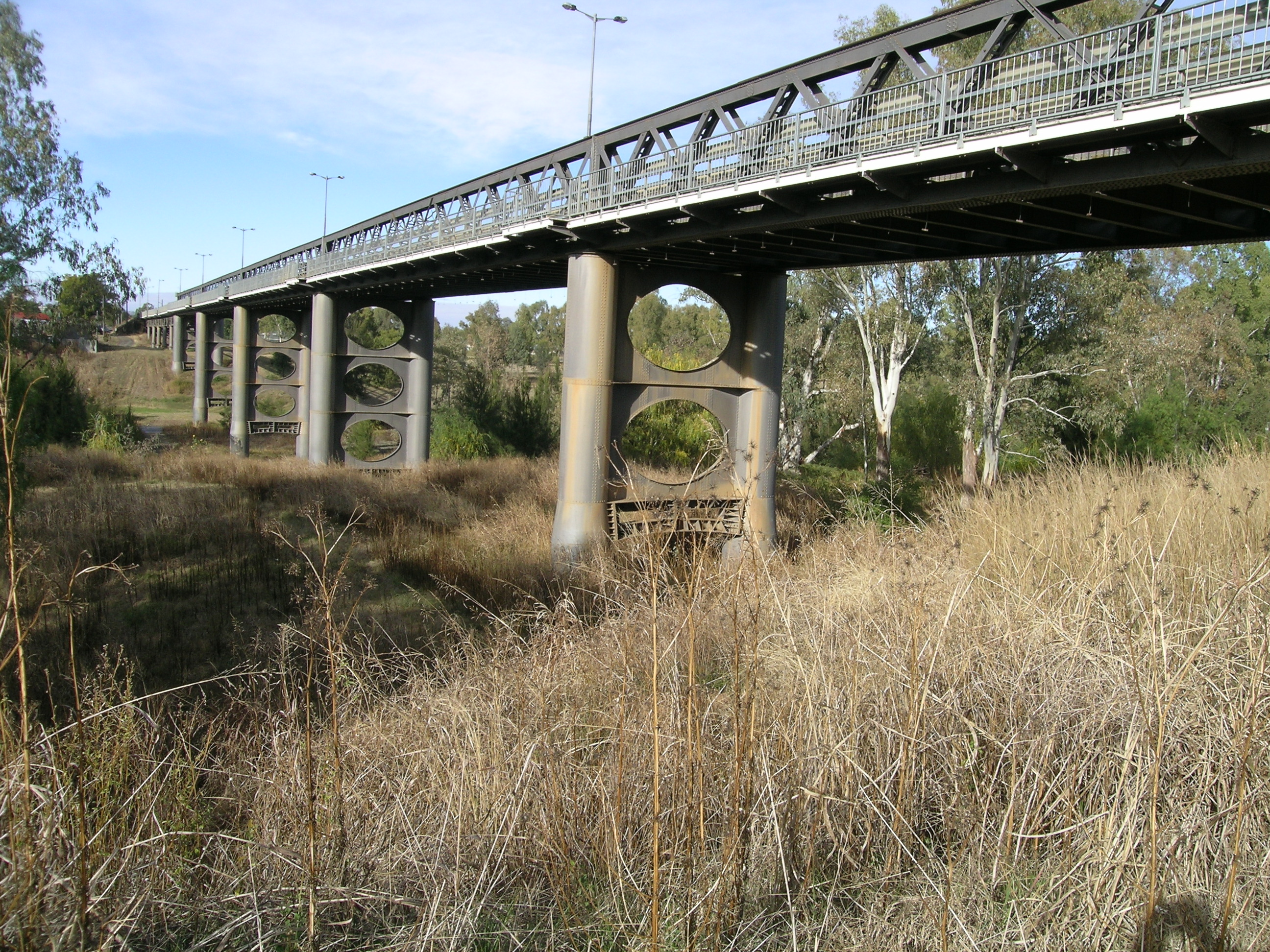
- Bridge over the Namoi River in Manilla

General information
- Type: Rural road
- Length: 379 km (235 mi)
- Gazetted: August 1928
- Route number(s): B95 (2013–present) (Tamworth–Warialda); B76 (2013–present) (Warialda–Glen Innes)
- Former route number: State Route 95 (1974–2013) (Tamworth–Warialda)

Major junctions
- North end: New England Highway; Glen Innes, New South Wales
- Oxley Highway; Gwydir Highway
- South end: River Road; Nundle, New South Wales

Location(s)
- Major settlements: Tamworth, Bingara, Manilla, Inverell

Fossickers Way is a series of country roads located in the Northern Tablelands region of New South Wales, Australia that form a 379-kilometre (235 mi) scenic and tourist drive. The road's southern terminus is located in Nundle with its northwest terminus in Warialda; thereafter the road joins the Gwydir Highway and heads east to Inverell before reaching its eastern terminus in Glen Innes; The name refers to a tourist route overlaid on existing roads, and is not an officially gazetted one. The majority of the Fossickers Way is designated route B95.

The scenic route draws its name of Fossickers Way due to the many deposits of gold and the variety of gemstones that have been found in the area (mostly by Europeans) since the early 1850s. Prior to this time, local Aboriginal tribes such as the Werawai people of Nundle and its surrounds were known to use local minerals and stones for the purpose of making tools, such as axe heads.

== Route ==
Fossickers Way transverses the western slopes of the Northern Tablelands and passes through some of the world’s richest gem areas. In these parts, sapphires, zircon, jasper, prase, rhodonite, crystals and even gold may be found. The highway passes through open wheat and grazing lands and deeply wooded slopes, through country towns rich in gold rush history.

Fossickers Way starts at the intersection of River and Nundle Roads in Nundle, and continues in a north-westerly course along Nundle Road via Dungowan to meet New England Highway at Nemingha, then travels northeast along New England Highway to Tamworth. It then proceeds in a northerly direction along Manilla Road via Manilla to Barraba, continues north as Cobbadah Road via Cobbadah to Bingara, and continues north as Alan Cunningham Road to the intersection with Gwydir Highway just west of Warialda. It then proceeds east along Gwydir Highway through Warialda via Inverell to finish at Glen Innes. As a scenic drive that incorporates seven shires in northern NSW, Fossickers Way acts as an alternate route between Sydney and Brisbane.

In this area, sapphires, zircon, jasper, prase, ridonite, crystals and even gold may be found along various quarries, rivers and creeks, such as Swamp Oak Creek, just out of the town of Nundle where gold was discovered in 1851 by a local squatter, Nathan Burrows It has been reported that he made the discovery, then immediately informed folks in nearby Tamworth and the gold rush began thereafter. Gwydir Highway passes through open wheat and grazing lands and deeply wooded slopes through country towns, rich in gold rush history.

== History ==
The passing of the Main Roads Act of 1924 through the Parliament of New South Wales provided for the declaration of Main Roads, roads partially funded by the State government through the Main Roads Board (MRB). Main Road No. 63 was declared along this road from the intersection with Great Northern Highway (today New England Highway) at Tamworth, via Manilla and Bingara to Warialda (and continuing northwards via Yetman and Boggabilla eventually to the border with Queensland at Goondiwindi), and Main Road No. 105 from Nundle to the intersection with Great Northern Highway, today New England Highway, at Tamworth (and continuing southwards via Glenrock to Scone) on the same day, on 8 August 1928. With the passing of the Main Roads (Amendment) Act of 1929 to provide for additional declarations of State Highways and Trunk Roads, these were amended to Trunk Road 63 and Main Road 105 on 8 April 1929.

The Department of Main Roads, which had succeeded the MRB in 1932, truncated the northern end of Trunk Road 63 to Yetman when State Highway 16 (later named Bruxner Highway) was declared on 16 March 1938, subsuming the former alignment from Yetman via Boggabilla to the state border with Queensland at Goondiwindi.

The passing of the Roads Act of 1993 updated road classifications and the way they could be declared within New South Wales. Under this act, the route today retains its declaration as Main Roads 63 and 105, from Nundle to Nemingha, then from Tamworth to Warialda.

Fossickers Way was signed State Route 95 between Tamworth and Warialda in 1974. With the conversion to the newer alphanumeric system in 2013, this was replaced with route B95.

== Tourism ==
Many events occur along Fossickers Way throughout the year, including the annual Tamworth Country Music Festival in January. The Fossicker's Way Treasure Hunt is also an annual event which takes participants through all eight towns on the trail.

== Major junctions ==
LGA	Location	km	mi	Destinations	Notes
Tamworth	Nundle	0.0	0.0	Jenkins Street (River Road); Oakenville Street (Nundle Road)	4-way intersection; southern terminus of Fossickers Way; Fossickers Way continues west along Nundle Road
Peel River		0.6	0.37	Bridge over the river (Bridge name unknown)	
Peel River		12	7.5	Bridge over the river (Bridge name unknown)	
Tamworth	Bowling Alley Point	12	7.5	River Road – Nundle	T-intersection
Tamworth	Dungowan	34	21	Ogunbil Road – Gloucester	Roundabout
Cockburn River		51	32	Bridge over the river (Bridge name unknown)	
Tamworth	Nemingha	51	32	New England Highway/Oxley Highway (A15/B56 east) – Tamworth, Armidale	4-way intersection; south-eastern concurrency terminus with routes A15/B56
Tamworth	Tamworth	57	35	Murray Street (New England Highway) (A15 west) – Muswellbrook, Singleton, Newcastle	North-western concurrency terminus with route A15 at roundabout
Tamworth	Tamworth	58	36	Oxley Highway (B56 west) – Gunnedah, Coonabarabran	North-western concurrency terminus with route B56; southern terminus of route B95 at T-intersection
Namoi River		104	65	Bridge over the river (Bridge name unknown)	
Manilla River		116	72	Bridge over the river (Bridge name unknown)	
Manilla River		150	93	Bridge over the river (Bridge name unknown)	
Gwydir	Bingara	210	130	Finch Street (west) – Bingara; Maitland Street (north) – Bingara	4-way intersection
Gwydir	Bingara	210	130	Link Street (south) – Bingara	T-intersection
Gwydir River		211	131	Bridge over the river (Bridge name unknown)	
Myall Creek		218	135	Bridge over the river (Bridge name unknown)	
Gwydir	Warialda	248	154	Gwydir Highway (B76) – Moree, Inverell	Northern terminus of route B95 at T-intersection
Gwydir	Warialda	251	156	Warialda Road – Yetman, Boggabilla	T-intersection
Macintyre River		311	193	Bridge over the river (bridge name unknown)	
Inverell	Inverell	312	194	Byron Street (northeast) – Inverell	Roundabout
Inverell	Inverell	313	194	Tinga Road, to Thunderbolts Way – Uralla, Walcha, Gloucester	T-intersection
Glen Innes Severn	Glen Innes	379	235	Church Street (New England Highway) (A15) – Armidale, Tamworth, Stanthorpe, Warwick (QLD)	T-intersection; eastern terminus of Fossickers Way; Gwydir Highway (B76) continues south along Church Street
1.000 mi = 1.609 km; 1.000 km = 0.621 mi: Concurrency terminus; Route transition

== See also ==
- List of highways in New South Wales
