= Split Rock Dam =

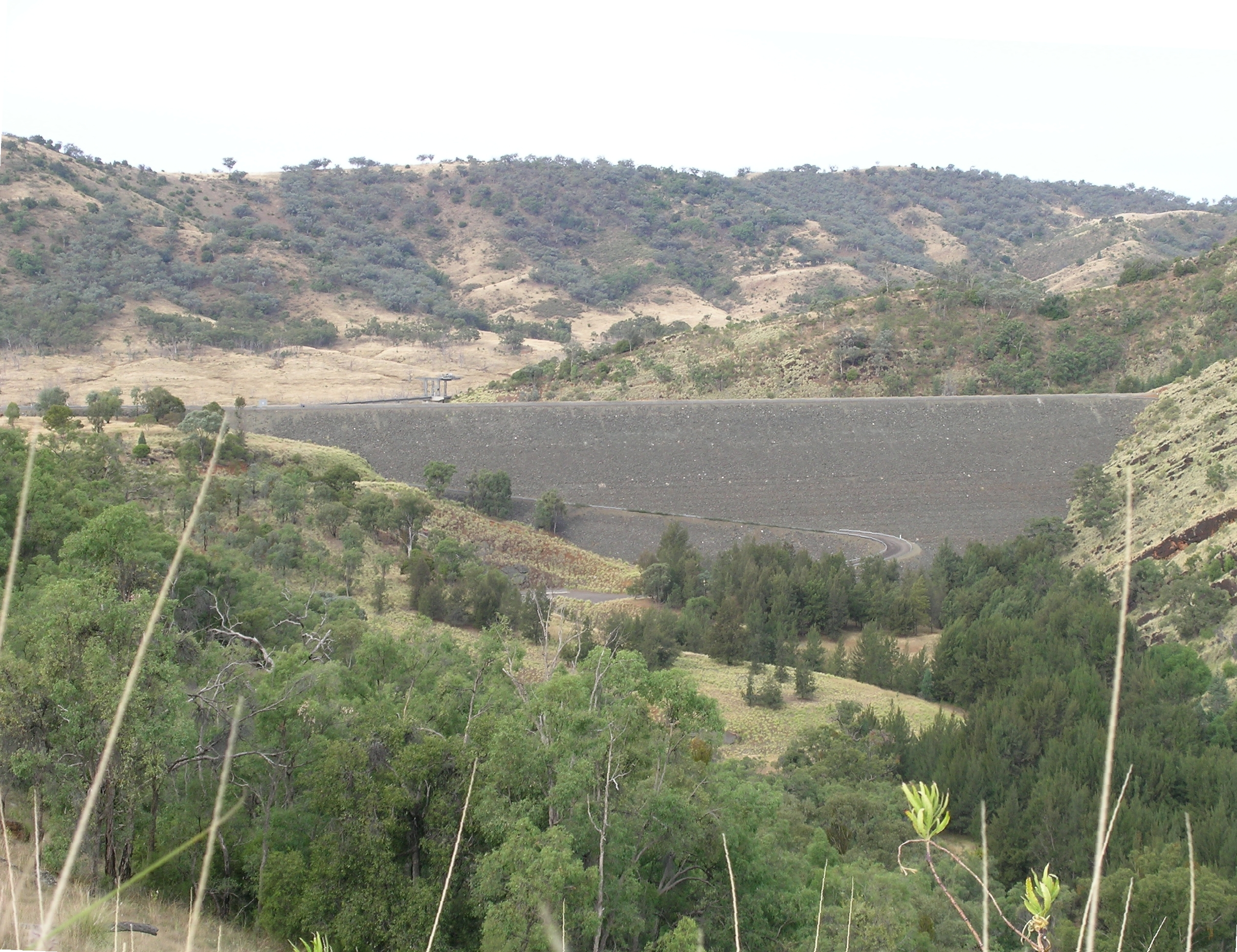
- Split Rock Dam wall, 2010.

- Location of the Split Rock Dam in New South Wales
- Country: Australia
- Location: North West Slopes, New South Wales
- Coordinates: 30°32′S 150°42′E
- Status: Operational
- Construction began: 1984
- Opening date: 1987
- Owner: State Water Corporation

Dam and spillways
- Type of dam: Rock-fill dam
- Impounds: Manilla River
- Height: 66 m (217 ft)
- Length: 484 m (1,588 ft)
- Dam volume: 1,048 m^{3} (37,000 cu ft)
- Spillways: 1
- Spillway type: Ungated concrete chute
- Spillway capacity: 6,860 m^{3}/s (242,000 cu ft/s)

Reservoir
- Creates: Split Rock Reservoir
- Total capacity: 397,370 ML (322,150 acre⋅ft)
- Catchment area: 1,650 km^{2} (640 sq mi)
- Surface area: 2,150 ha (5,300 acres)
- Maximum water depth: 52 m (171 ft)
- Normal elevation: 449 m (1,473 ft) AHD
- Website waternsw.com.au

Split Rock Dam is a minor embankment dam across the Manilla River upstream of Manilla in the north-western slopes region of New South Wales, Australia. The dam's purpose includes flood mitigation, irrigation, water supply and conservation. The impounded reservoir is called Split Rock Reservoir.

== Location and features ==
Commenced in 1984, completed in 1987, and upgraded in 2012, the Split Rock Dam is a minor concrete-face rock-filled dam on the Manilla River, located approximately 28 kilometres (17 mi) upstream, north of Manilla and 70 kilometres (43 mi) north of Tamworth, accessed by a turnoff from Fossickers Way. The dam was built by Abignano Pty Limited on behalf of the New South Wales Department of Land and Water Conservation to supply water for irrigation, flood mitigation and potable water for towns in the Namoi Valley, including Manilla and Barraba. Together with Keepit Dam, Split Rock Dam supplies extensive irrigation water in the Namoi Valley. The dams also supply water for the town of Walgett and generates hydro-power for the national grid.

The dam wall constructed with 1,048 cubic metres (37,000 cu ft) of concrete faced rockfill is 66 metres (217 ft) high and 484 metres (1,588 ft) long. The maximum water depth is 52 metres (171 ft) and, when full, the reservoir has capacity of 397,370 megalitres (322,150 acre⋅ft) at 449 metres (1,473 ft) AHD. The surface area of Split Rock Reservoir is 2,150 hectares (5,300 acres) and the catchment area is 1,650 square kilometres (640 sq mi), mostly from the Upper Manilla and Ironbark Creeks plus small creeks and gullies, too, including Crow Mountain and Eumur Creeks. The uncontrolled concrete chute spillway is capable of discharging 6,860 cubic metres per second (242,000 cu ft/s). An A$8.1 million upgrade of facilities was completed during 2012 and involved construction of a new, 2-metre-high (6.6 ft) concrete parapet wall on the embankment.

At the time of its initial construction in 1987, Split Rock Dam incorporated the latest dam technology with an intake tower that can select water from any specified depth. This ensures that cold, de-oxygenated water from lower levels is mixed with water that contains more oxygen from the warmer layers above, before it leaves the storage.

In 2013, Tamworth Regional Council announced a project to construct a 28 kilometres (17 mi) pipeline from Split Rock Dam to Barraba to ensure local residents have access to a quality water supply would proceed. Additional project infrastructure includes a pumping station near the dam, a pressure tank, and upgrades to Barrabra water treatment plant.

The dam is named after a fissure in a large rock near the dam site.

== Recreation ==
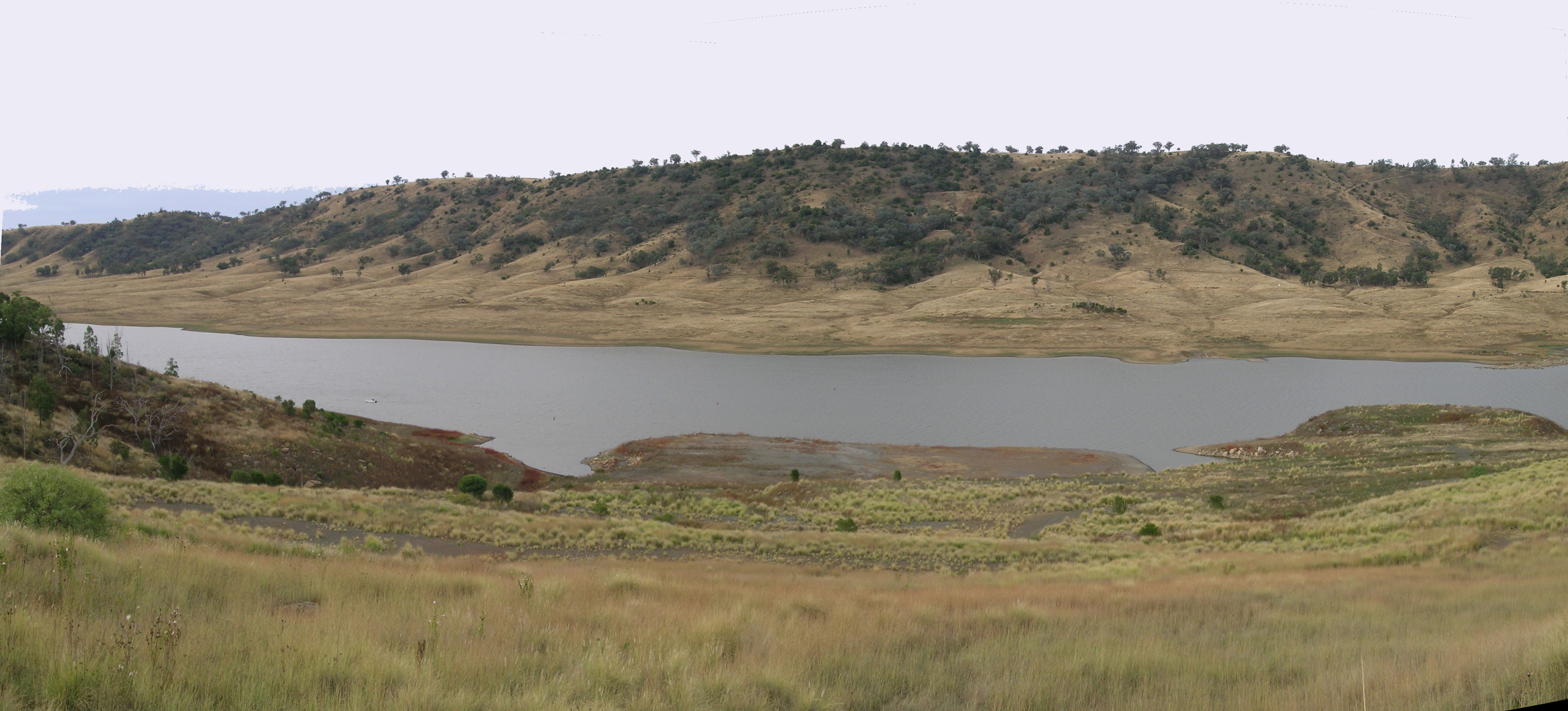
Split Rock Reservoir, at 2.8% of its capacity, 2010.

The reservoir has recreational opportunities including camping areas and facilities for launching ski boats and sailing boats. There are toilet, barbecue, picnic, and camping facilities as well as a boat ramp. Boat access is restricted near the dam wall. The reservoir contains fish species such as Murray cod, golden perch, silver perch, eel-tailed catfish and carp.

On the reservoir's northern shore is Glen Riddle Recreation Reserve, a 14 hectares (35 acres) nature reserve with toilets, picnic and camping facilities.

== See also ==
- Irrigation in Australia
- Keepit Dam
- List of dams and reservoirs in New South Wales
