= Bundarra-Barraba Important Bird Area =

Important Bird Area in New South Wales, Australia

Coordinates: 30°26′S 150°52′E

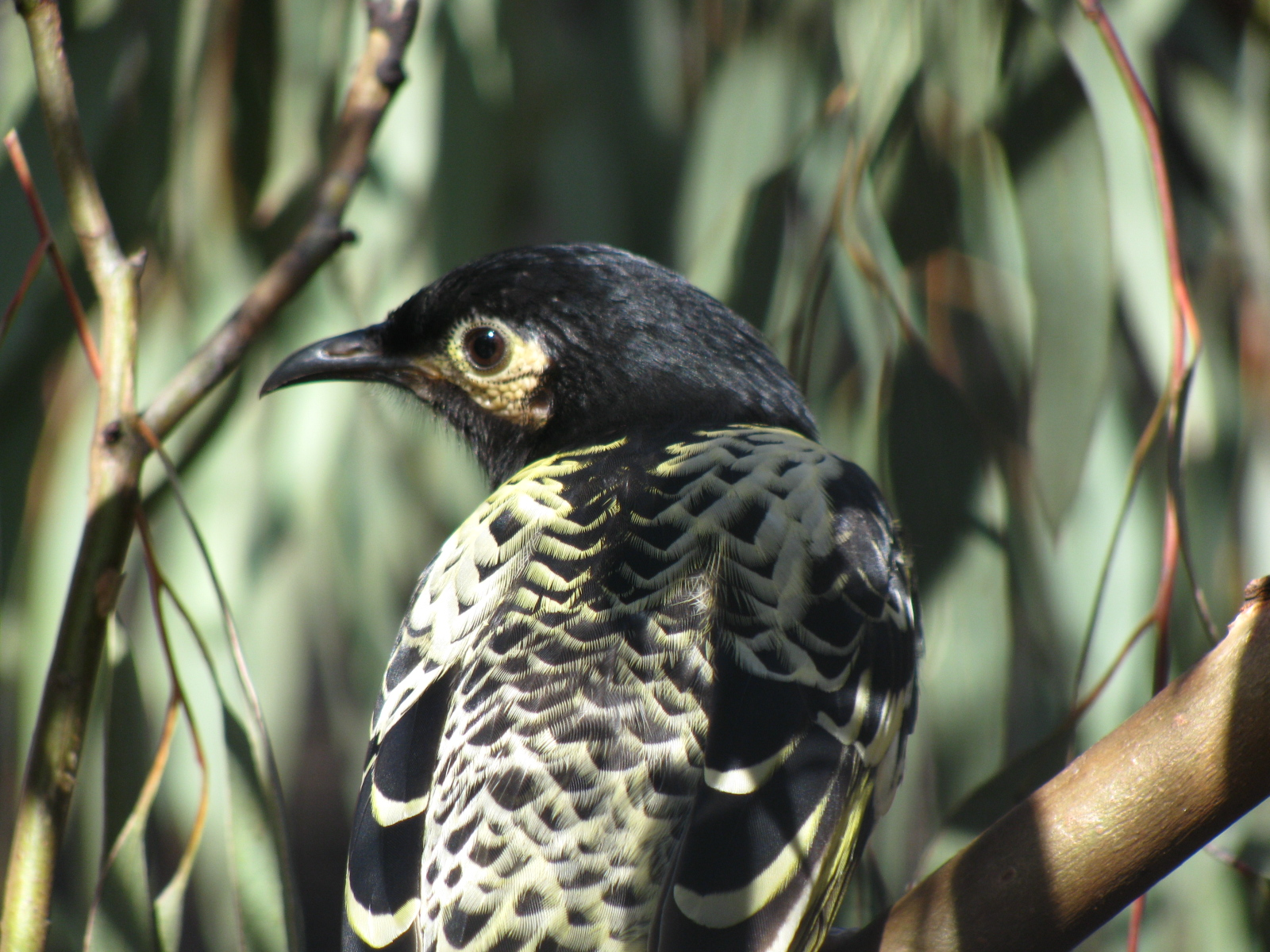
The Bundarra-Barraba area is important for the regent honeyeater

The Bundarra-Barraba Important Bird Area lies in the Northern Tablelands of north-eastern New South Wales, Australia. It is important for the conservation of the endangered regent honeyeater and is classified as an Important Bird Area (IBA) by BirdLife International.

== Description ==
The 3500 km^{2} IBA is roughly bounded by the towns of Bundarra, Barraba, Kingstown and Manilla, and their connecting roads. It is characterised by a mix of eucalypt woodlands and farmland.

== Birds ==
The IBA supports the second-largest population of the regent honeyeater as well as significant numbers of the near threatened diamond firetail.
