= Manilla River =

Coordinates: 30°45′S 150°43′E

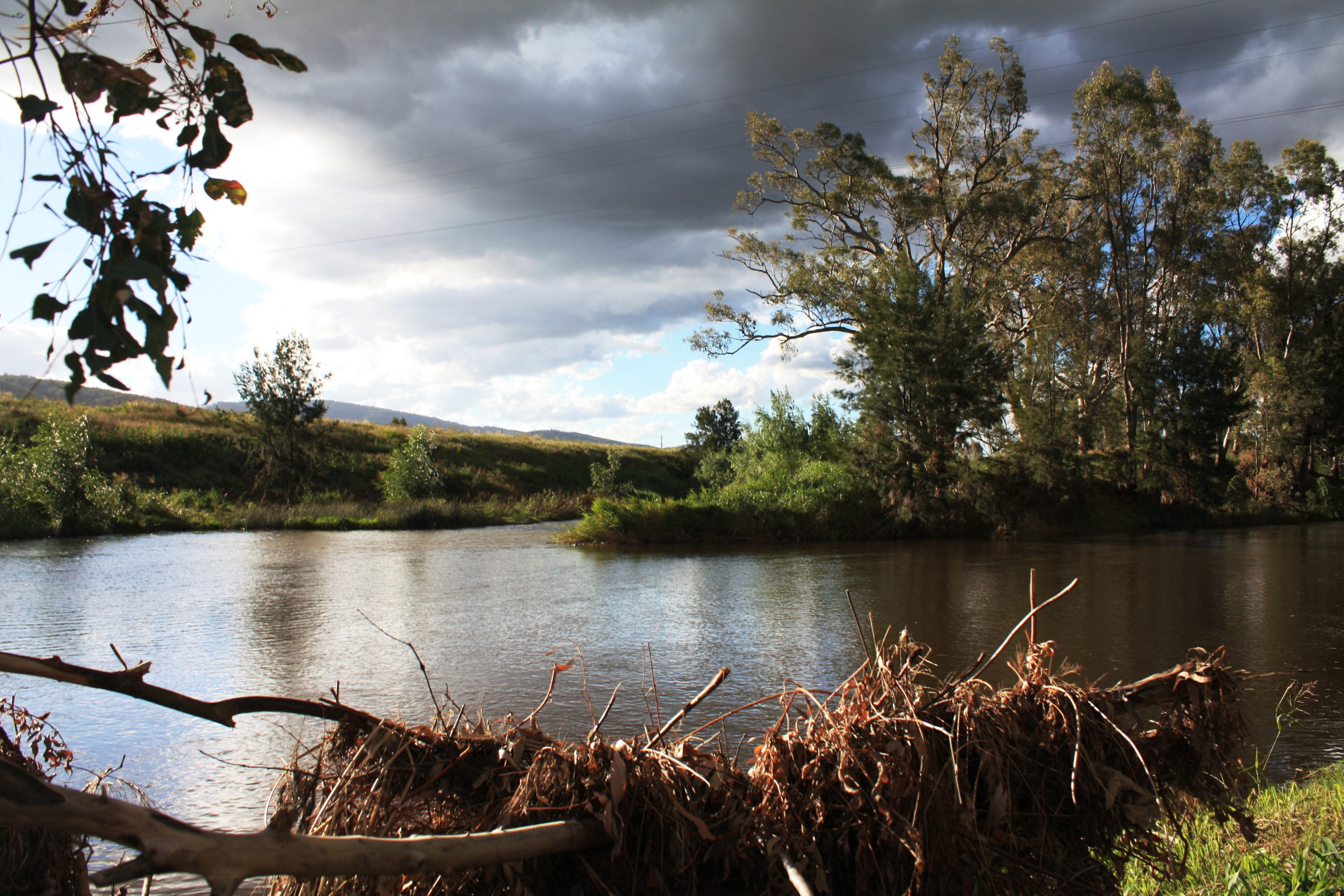
- The confluence of the Manilla River and the Namoi River at Manilla.
- Etymology: Aboriginal: manilla, maneela, muneela meaning "winding river" or "round about".

Location
- Country: Australia
- State: New South Wales
- Region: IBRA: New England Tablelands, Brigalow Belt South
- District: Northern Tablelands
- Municipality: Tamworth

Physical characteristics
- Source
  - location: south–west of Barraba
  - elevation: 845 m (2,772 ft)
- Mouth: confluence with the Namoi River
  - location: Manilla
  - elevation: 349 m (1,145 ft)
- Length: 138 km (86 mi)

Basin features
- River system: Murray–Darling basin
- Reservoir: Split Rock Reservoir

Manilla River, a perennial stream that is part of the Namoi catchment within the Murray–Darling basin, is located in the Northern Tablelands district of New South Wales, Australia.

The stream (called a river) rises south–west of Barraba on the northern slopes of the Baldwins Range and drains a portion of the hill country on the western side of the New England highlands and the southern slopes of the Nandewar Range; flowing generally north and east and to the town of Barraba. During its course, the stream is joined by five minor tributaries, and flows in a southerly direction towards its confluence with the Namoi River at the town of Manilla; dropping 496 metres (1,627 ft) over its length of 138 kilometres (86 mi).

The name of the river is derived from the Australian Aboriginal words of manilla, maneela, or muneela meaning "winding river" or "round about".

Approximately 10 kilometres (6.2 mi) north of Manilla, Split Rock Reservoir, on the Manilla River, provides one of the main water storages for flood control and irrigation in the Namoi River basin.

== See also ==
- List of rivers of Australia
- Rivers of New South Wales
