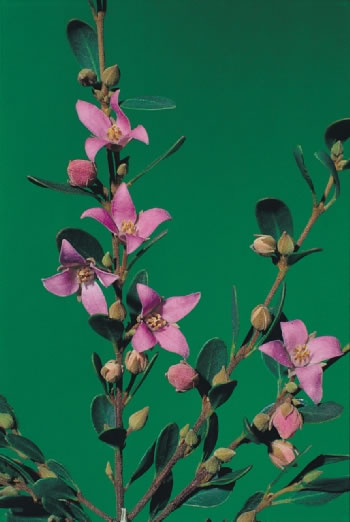

Scientific classification
- Kingdom: Plantae
- Clade: Tracheophytes
- Clade: Angiosperms
- Clade: Eudicots
- Clade: Rosids
- Order: Sapindales
- Family: Rutaceae
- Genus: Boronia
- Species: B. ruppii

Binomial name
- Boronia ruppii Cheel

= Boronia ruppii =

Rupp's boronia

Species of flowering plant

Boronia ruppii, commonly known as Rupp's boronia, is a species of plant in the citrus family Rutaceae and is endemic to a small area in New South Wales. It is a shrub with hairy branches, simple and trifoliate leaves and pink, four-petalled flowers in the leaf axils. It only grows around the abandoned Woodsreef asbestos mine.

== Description ==
Boronia ruppii is a shrub that grows to a height of 0.4–2 m (1 ft 4 in – 6 ft 7 in) with hairy younger branches. The leaves are simple and trifoliate, the leaves and leaflets elliptic to spatula-shaped, 4–18 mm (0.16–0.71 in) long and 3–8 mm (0.12–0.31 in) wide on a petiole 1–3 mm (0.04–0.1 in) long. The flowers are pale to bright pink and are arranged singly in or in groups of up to three in leaf axils on a pedicel 3–8 mm (0.1–0.3 in) long. The four sepals are triangular to egg-shaped, 2–5 mm (0.08–0.2 in) long and 1–3 mm (0.04–0.1 in) wide. The four petals are 6–11 mm (0.24–0.43 in) long and 3–4.5 mm (0.1–0.2 in) wide. The eight stamens alternate in length with those near the sepals slightly longer than those near the petals. Flowering mainly occurs from July to December and the fruit is a glabrous capsule 4–6 mm (0.16–0.24 in) long and 3–3.5 mm (0.1–0.1 in) wide.

== Taxonomy and naming ==
Rupp's boronia was first formally described in 1928 by Edwin Cheel who published the description in Journal and Proceedings of the Royal Society of New South Wales from a specimen collected by Herman Rupp. The specific epithet (ruppii) honours the collector of the type specimen.

== Distribution and habitat ==
Boronia ruppii grows in dry woodland on soils derived from serpentinite and only occurs around the abandoned Woodsreef asbestos mine near Barraba.

== Conservation status ==
This boronia is listed as "endangered" under the New South Wales Government Biodiversity Conservation Act 2016. The main threats to the species are grazing by domestic livestock, feral and native animals, inappropriate fire regimes, clearing and habitat disturbance, and its small population size.
