= Manilla, New South Wales =

Manilla New South Wales
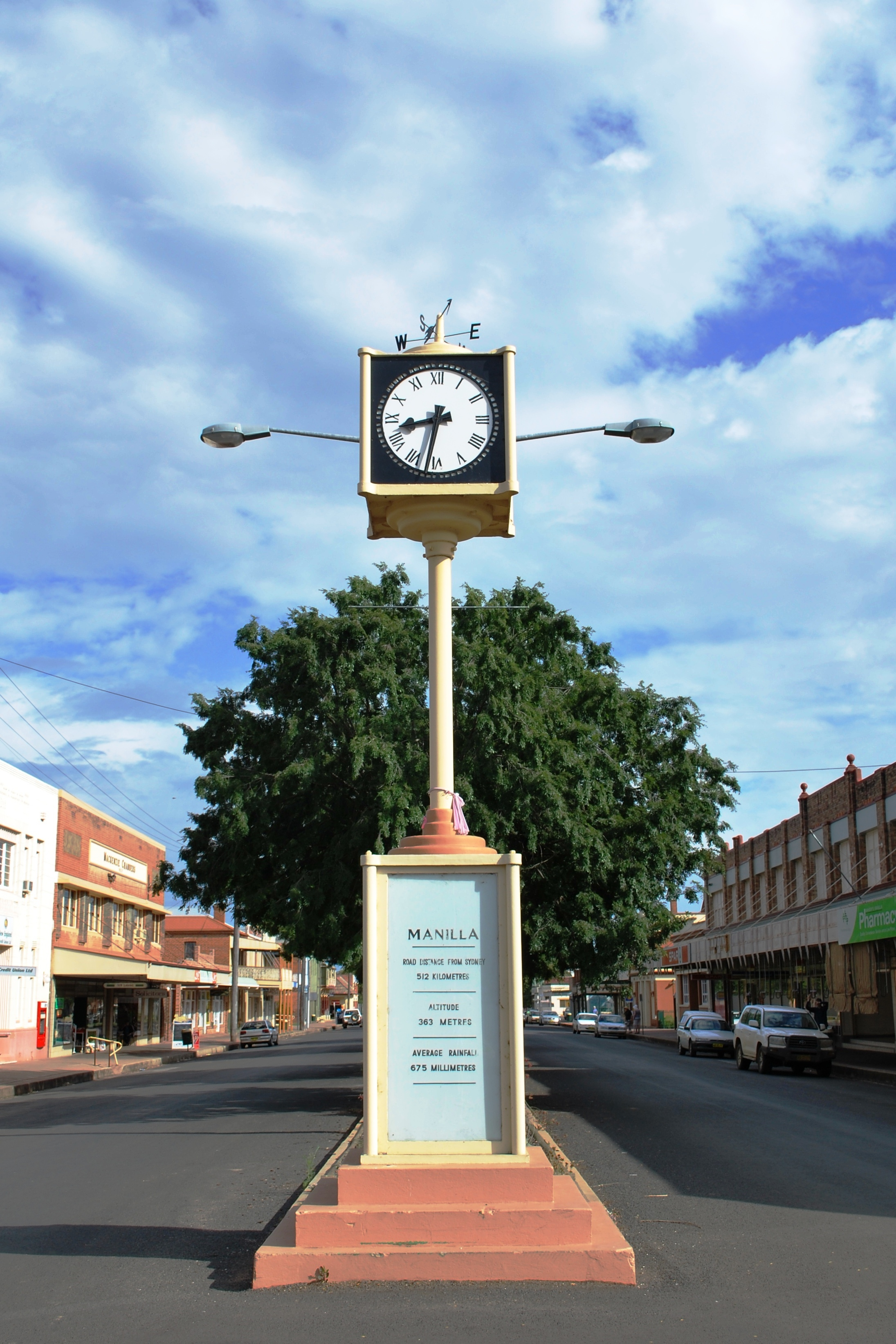
- Clock tower in the main street

- Coordinates: 30°45′0″S 150°43′0″E
- Population: 2,386 (2021 census)
- Elevation: 357 m (1,171 ft)
- Location: 45 km (28 mi) NW of Tamworth; 151 km (94 mi) S of Warialda; 459 km (285 mi) N of Sydney; 620 km (385 mi) SW of Brisbane
- LGA(s): Tamworth Regional Council
- County: Darling
- State electorate(s): Tamworth
- Federal division(s): New England

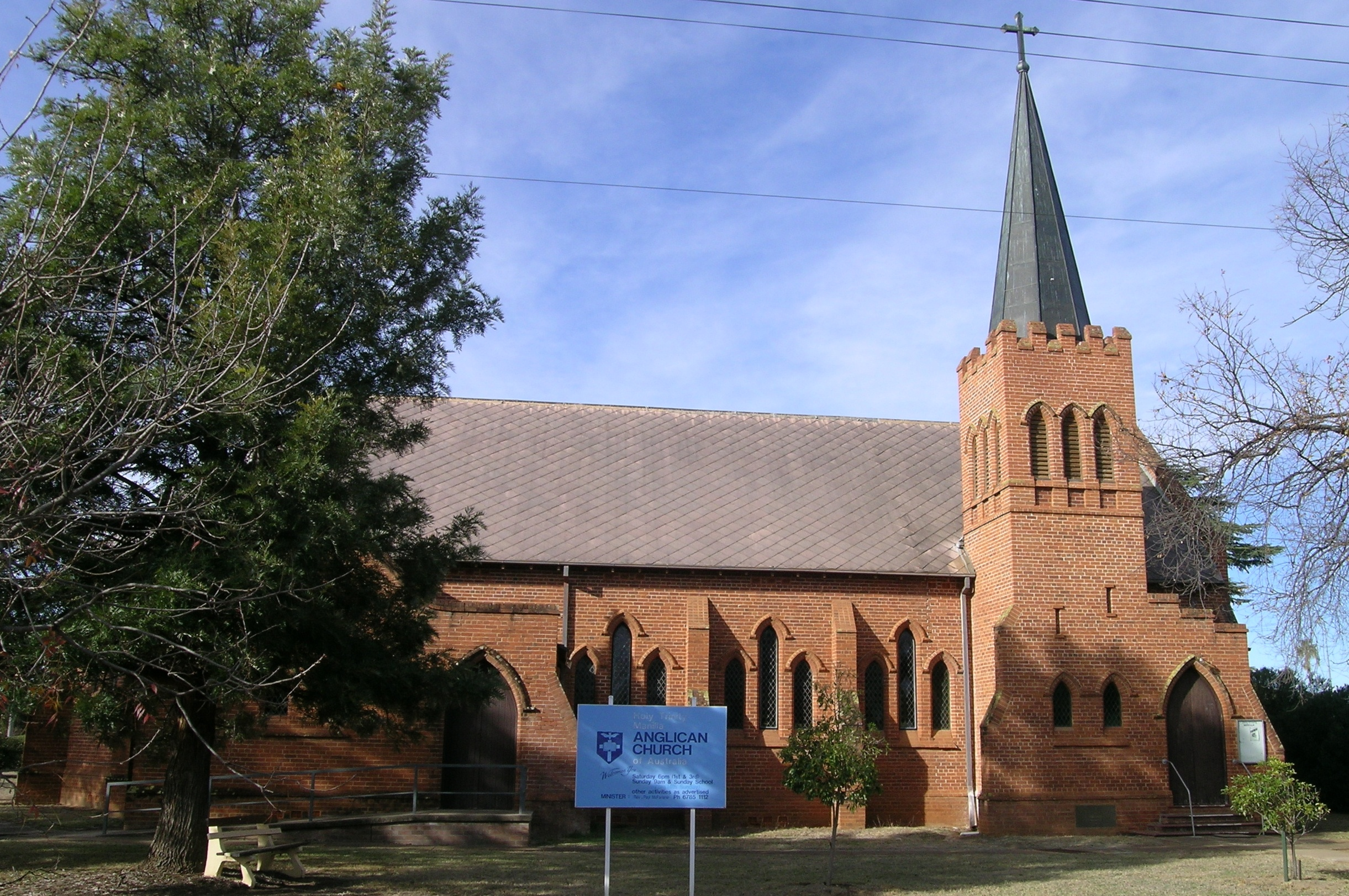
Holy Trinity Anglican Church, Manilla, NSW

Manilla is a small town in New South Wales, Australia, located on Fossickers Way 45 kilometres northwest of the regional city of Tamworth and 27 kilometres northeast of the historic village Somerton. Manilla is famous for its setting as a fishing, paragliding, and mountain biking area. The name Manilla comes from the Gamilaraay word 'Maneela', which is said to mean 'meeting of the rivers'.

The township of Manilla was established in 1853 at the junction of the Namoi River and the Manilla River. It was formerly the centre of Manilla Shire local government area, but this was amalgamated with Tamworth City Council and portions of Parry, Barraba and Nundle Shire Councils to form Tamworth Regional Council in 2004. It lies next to the Bundarra-Barraba Important Bird Area which is important for the conservation of the critically endangered regent honeyeater. Manilla is also well known for Split Rock Dam on the Manilla River and Lake Keepit on the Namoi River.

== Public facilities ==
- Police Station
- Post Office
- Swimming Pool
- Sportsground
- Tennis Courts
- War Memorial Hall, Library and Preschool

== Transport ==
Manilla is served by Tamworth Buslines route 443 from Tamworth.

== History ==
The junction of the Manilla and Namoi Rivers known as 'Maneela', was for generations, a camping ground for the local Indigenous people, members of the large Kamilaroi (Gamilaraay) tribes of northwestern New South Wales.

Thomas Florance led the first British surveying expedition to the region in 1827. The local Aboriginal clan rolled boulders from the hills onto Florance's encampment, whose men then fired upon them. Another skirmish occurred resulting in one of the surveying team being wounded by a spear and Florance shooting an Aboriginal man.

In 1832, Henry Dangar and Sir William Edward Parry conducted further surveying for the Australian Agricultural Company and camped on what is now the present site of the Manilla township. They found several Aboriginal families living there.

Around 1836, British pastoral squatters arrived in the area looking to establish large sheep and cattle stations on so-called crown land for the small leasehold fee of £10 per annum. Three massive properties were soon established in the Manilla region: Greenhatches formed by Joseph Greenhatch on behalf of Sydney businessman Charles Smith; Dinawirindi formed by Otto Baldwin; and Cuerindi formed by Thomas Simpson Hall and his brothers.

Conflict in the area between the colonists and the resident Aboriginal population resulted in the government sending a large detachment of New South Wales Mounted Police under the command of Major James Nunn to the region in early 1838. Nunn's force captured around 100 Aboriginal people just to the west of what is now Manilla, with fifteen taken prisoner and one being shot dead. Frontier conflict in the immediate vicinity appears to have ended after Nunn's operation, who proceeded north-west with his men, later perpetrating the Waterloo Creek massacre.

In about 1837, William Wentworth and John Charles Lloyd, squatted on a large tract of land in the area by moving stock further north. Wentworth named the station "Monilla and Glen Riddle", the boundaries of which overlapped somewhat with Dinawirindi, as shown in the 1848 Government Gazette, spreading on both sides of the Namoi and up the Manilla River. Dinawirindi was later reduced in size and re-named as Durham Court with the Baldwin family holding the property up until 2016. Cuerindi was also held within the Hall family for generations.

During the 1850s, teamsters with bullock waggons were regularly transporting goods from the Hunter District through the Manilla area to outlying cattle stations and the northern goldfield settlements of Bingara and Bundarra. Teams were often delayed at the junction of the Namoi and Manilla Rivers by high water. In 1853, enterprising Englishman George Veness arrived at ‘The Junction’ to set up a store and wine shop at the teamsters’ camping ground. In doing so, Veness is acknowledged as the founder of the Manilla township which was located on the boundary of the Manilla and Dinawirindi pastoral properties. The town's early prosperity was founded on the highly productive wheat and pastoral industries.

In 1864, the nascent township was practically wiped out by an immense flood. It took many years for the town to recover, with the first school being built in 1878 and the first post-office in 1880.

Australian singer-songwriter Darren Hanlon produced a song entitled 'Manilla NSW' which appeared on his 2006 record, 'Fingertips and Mountaintops'.

Historical population
Year	Pop.	±%
1921	1,380	—
1933	1,774	+28.6%
1947	1,802	+1.6%
1954	1,972	+9.4%
1961	1,914	−2.9%
1966	1,761	−8.0%
1971	1,703	−3.3%
1976	1,849	+8.6%
1981	1,884	+1.9%
1986	2,017	+7.1%
1991	2,110	+4.6%
1996	2,073	−1.8%
2001	2,033	−1.9%
2006	2,081	+2.4%
2011	2,107	+1.2%
2016	2,106	−0.0%
2021	2,014	−4.4%
Source: Australian Bureau of Statistics data.

At the 2006 census, Manilla had a population of 2,082, whilst as at the 2021 census there were 2,386 people.

== Rugby League and Dally Messenger ==
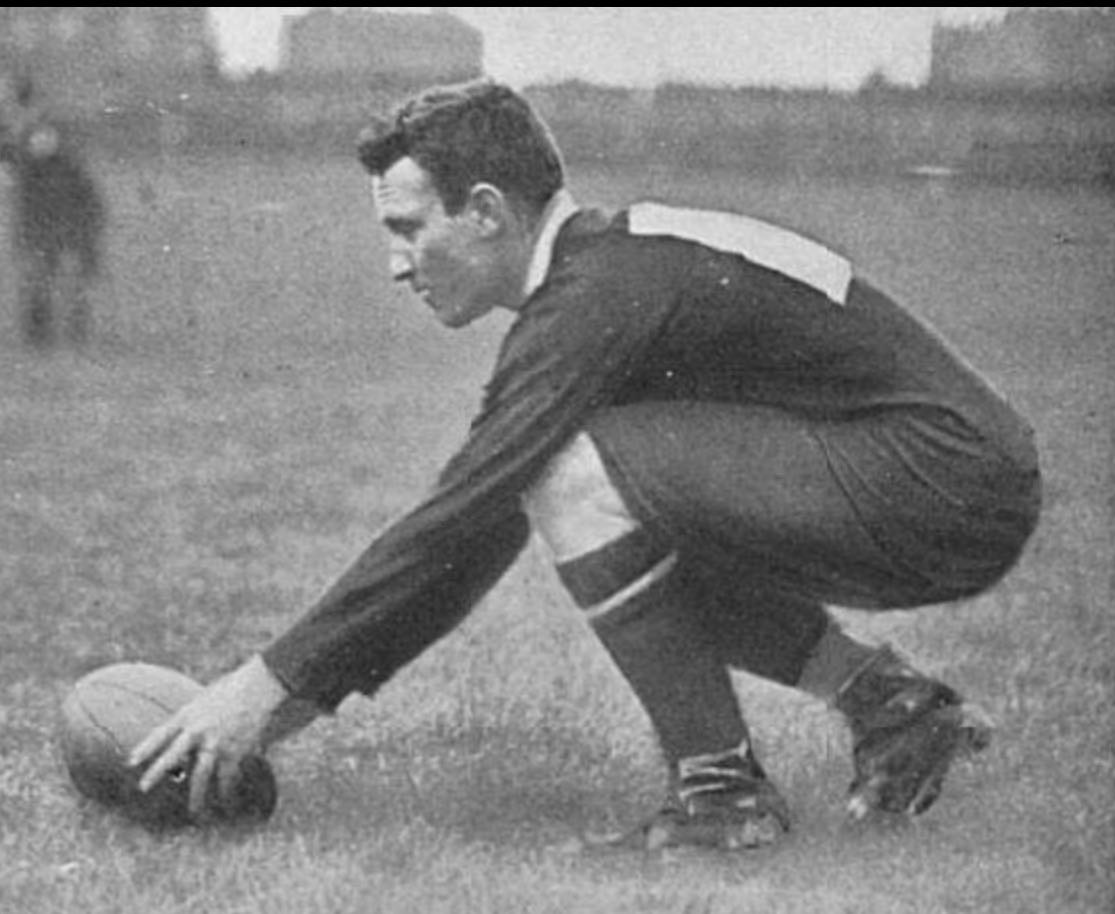
Dally Messenger preparing to kick a goal

In July 1917 Dally Messenger and his wife, Annie, took over the Royal Hotel in Manilla. Shortly after his arrival Dally established the Manilla Rugby League Club. This was difficult as there was a strong Rugby Union Team and many other young men were at Gallipoli or other theatres of World War I.

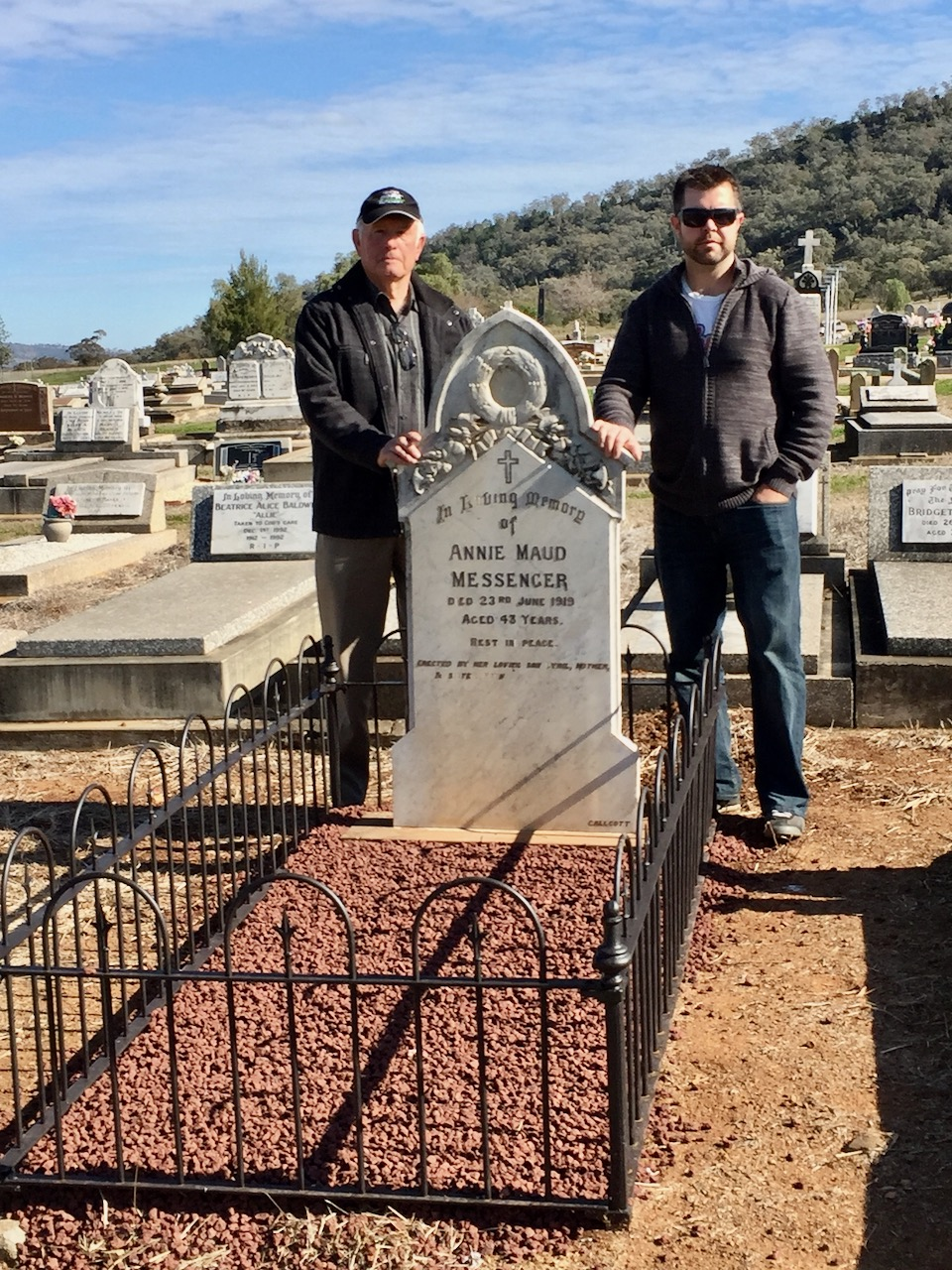
Grave of Annie Messenger – Manilla NSW. On the left is Annie and Dally's grandson, Ken Messenger, and on the right Cameron Dally Messenger, the great grandson.

His original team included Jack Hiscox, Roy Blanch, Frank and Norman Chapman, Jack Munro and Ivan Miller. Dally played some games but was more concerned, as coach, into forming these local young men into a quality team. In 1918 in the knockout competition held in Tamworth, Manilla defeated Quirindi 10-6 and Tamworth 14 nil.

In June 1919 Both Dally and Annie caught the Spanish flu pandemic. Dally recovered but Annie died on 23 June 1919 and is buried in the Manilla cemetery. On 23 August 1919 Dally returned to Sydney with his five year old son (Dally II).

Marking the history on the very day of its formation, 8 July 2017, the Manilla Rugby League club under captain Coach Mitch Doring celebrated its 100th anniversary (2017) of formation with a hard fought match against the Bendemeer Mountain Men whom they defeated 34–30. Guests of honour at the celebratory dinner afterwards included Dally Messenger’s grandsons Ken and Dally Messenger, and great grandchildren Cameron Dally Messenger and Genevieve Ann Messenger.

== Heritage listings ==
Manilla has a number of heritage-listed sites, including:

- Tamworth-Barraba railway: Manilla railway underbridges

== Aviation sports ==
In recent years, Manilla has become famous throughout the world as a major sports flying centre supporting hang gliding, paragliding, ultralight aircraft, gyrocopters and gliders (sailplanes). It boasts nearby Mt Borah, one of the world's best paraglider and hang glider launch sites. In 1998 local paragliding instructor and developer of Mt Borah, Godfrey Wenness, gained the world distance record with a flight of 335 kilometres (208 mi). Major free-flight competitions are staged annually during the summer months. The 10th FAI Paragliding World Championships were held at the site in 2007, attended by 150 pilots from 41 nations. In the week prior to the event Manilla was in the headlines around the world for the survival of paraglider pilot Ewa Wiśnierska of Germany who was sucked up into a thunderstorm to 9,946 metres (32,631 ft). The dramatic story was made into a TV documentary Miracle in the Storm which won an AFI award and was nominated for a Logie Award.

== Notable residents ==
- Henry Burrell (1873–1945), an amateur naturalist, photographer & film-maker, began unlocking the secrets of the platypus.
- Stan Coster (27 May 1930 – 25 March 1997), an Australian country music singer-songwriter.
- Tracy Coster, Australian country music artist, daughter of Stan Coster (above)
- Fiona Coote, aged 14, in 1984 became Australia's second and also its youngest heart transplant recipient
- Dally Messenger (1883–1959), a rugby league and rugby union player. He came to Manilla in 1917 and held the licence of The Royal Hotel.
- Harry M. Miller, entrepreneur, bought the Manilla property "Dunmore" in the 1970s.
- John Quayle, Australian former rugby league CEO, began playing rugby league with Manilla as a boy.
