= Barraba, New South Wales =

Barraba
- Town
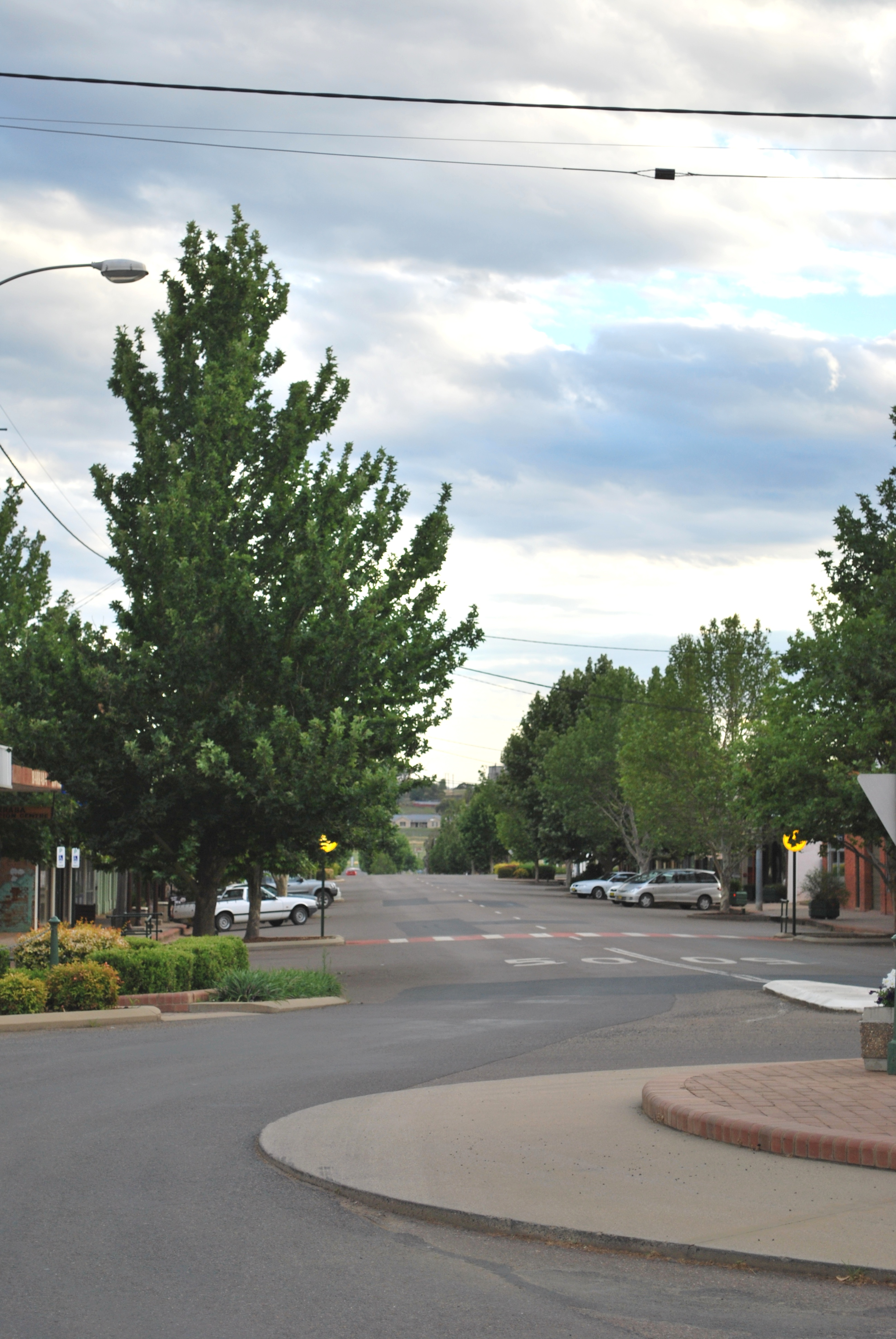
- The main street of Barraba

- Coordinates: 30°22′42″S 150°36′38″E
- Country: Australia
- State: New South Wales
- LGA: Tamworth Regional Council
- Location: 477 km (296 mi) from Sydney; 548 km (341 mi) from Brisbane (Qld); 90 km (56 mi) from Tamworth
- Established: 1850s

Government
  - State electorate: Tamworth
  - Federal division: New England
- Elevation: 500 m (1,600 ft)

Population
  - Total: 1,410 (2016 census)
- Postcode: 2347
- County: Darling
- Mean max temp: 24.4 °C (75.9 °F)
- Mean min temp: 8.3 °C (46.9 °F)
- Annual rainfall: 688.7 mm (27.11 in)

Barraba /ˈbærəbə/ is a town in the New England region of northern New South Wales, Australia. It was formerly the centre of Barraba Shire local government area, but most of this, including Barraba, was absorbed into Tamworth Regional Council in 2004. On Census night 2016, Barraba had a population of approximately 1,400 people. It is part of the Bundarra-Barraba Important Bird Area which is important for the conservation of the endangered regent honeyeater.

The town was the termination point for the Barraba branch railway line until it was closed.

== History ==
The Kamilaroi people lived and occupied the Barraba region prior to European settlement. The first white man in area was the explorer and botanist, Allan Cunningham, in 1827. At the same time, he discovered the Manilla River, which he named Buddle's Creek. A land holding named Barraba Station was taken up around 1837 or 1838. In July 1852, the Assistant Surveyor, J. T. Gorman mapped the future townsite.

During the 1850s, gold rushes in the region helped the growth of the township. On 1 April 1856, the first Barraba Post Office opened, with a brick post office built in 1882. A school followed, opening in 1861, in rented premises. In September 1876, there was an auction of the crown lands in Barraba. In the same year, the first St Laurence's church building was built, as well as the first bank. In 1878, the Commercial Hotel was built, and three years later, the Barraba Court House was built. On 20 March 1885, Barraba was proclaimed a town. During the 1890s, many more key buildings of the township were built, including the hospital (1891) and the Wesleyan Church (1898). In 1893, the population in Barraba reached 500; this increased to 1,164 in 1921.

First publised in 1900, the local newspaper Barraba Gazette closed on 8 April 2020 and was replaced by a section dedicated to Barraba news in the Manilla Express newspaper. The final extension of the Barraba railway line from Manilla to Barraba opened on 21 September 1908 without a ceremony. The last train to Barraba ran on 21 September 1983, with the majority of the line closing on 25 November 1987. In 1933, Connors Creek dam was constructed to supply water to the town.

Historical population
Year	Pop.	±%
1921	1,164	—
1933	1,428	+22.7%
1947	1,461	+2.3%
1954	1,521	+4.1%
1961	1,469	−3.4%
1966	1,425	−3.0%
1971	1,583	+11.1%
1976	1,947	+23.0%
1981	1,679	−13.8%
1986	1,498	−10.8%
1991	1,427	−4.7%
1996	1,267	−11.2%
2001	1,208	−4.7%
2006	1,161	−3.9%
2011	1,150	−0.9%
2016	1,126	−2.1%
2021	1,035	−8.1%
Source: Australian Bureau of Statistics data.

== Mining ==
=== Copper ===
In 1889, Copper was discovered at Gulf Creek, near Barraba and the first mine was established there in 1892. After mining had commenced, a village sprung up, which included a hotel, school and a post office. The Gulf Creek Post Office opened on 1 August 1897 and closed on 28 February 1966. At its peak, in 1901, the copper mine was one of the largest in the state. In July of that year, there were around 300 people living in the village.

=== Woodsreef asbestos mining and aftermath ===
Chrysotile asbestos was mined at Woodsreef, on a site of 400 hectares near Barraba. The Chrysotile Corporation of Australia carried out large-scale mining at the site from 1970 to 1983. The open-cut mine produced approximately 500,000 tonnes of chrysotile, or white asbestos, from 100 million tonnes of mined material.

The mine closure left a 75-million tonne waste rock dump covering an area of approximately 117 hectares. A 25-million tonne tailings dump also remains, covering approximately 43 hectares. This tailings stockpile has an average height of 45 metres, reaching a maximum height of 70 metres.

On 13 August 2008, an episode of The 7.30 Report described growing concern that the waste left by the derelict mine could pose a health risk to locals and passing tourists. The Asbestos Diseases Foundation of Australia called for an urgent clean-up of the site and a ban on members of the public going anywhere near it. A public dirt road did pass through the site until it was closed in December 2013.

The 7.30 Report story led to Hunter New England Health being directed to undertake an urgent study of the health implications for the Barraba community. This report has been completed but not released, despite the efforts of the Northern Daily Leader and the ABC to have its findings made public.

In 2011, the NSW State Government provided funding of $6.3 million to undertake major rehabilitation of the mine to address the most significant health, safety and environmental issues. These works included:

- containment of processed friable chrysotile asbestos
- removal of the former mill building, silos, and administration buildings
- implementation of a comprehensive air quality monitoring program and health risk assessment before, during and following remediation works
- closure of the nearby road.

== Climate and weather ==
Climate data for Barraba Post Office
Month	Jan	Feb	Mar	Apr	May	Jun	Jul	Aug	Sep	Oct	Nov	Dec	Year
Record high °C (°F)	44.9 (112.8)	44.0 (111.2)	38.2 (100.8)	34.4 (93.9)	29.5 (85.1)	24.4 (75.9)	25.1 (77.2)	32.1 (89.8)	33.5 (92.3)	38.0 (100.4)	41.0 (105.8)	42.1 (107.8)	44.9 (112.8)
Mean daily maximum °C (°F)	31.9 (89.4)	31.1 (88.0)	28.9 (84.0)	24.9 (76.8)	20.5 (68.9)	16.9 (62.4)	16.3 (61.3)	18.2 (64.8)	21.7 (71.1)	25.3 (77.5)	28.2 (82.8)	30.7 (87.3)	24.6 (76.3)
Mean daily minimum °C (°F)	16.5 (61.7)	15.9 (60.6)	12.8 (55.0)	7.9 (46.2)	4.0 (39.2)	1.5 (34.7)	0.3 (32.5)	1.1 (34.0)	4.1 (39.4)	8.1 (46.6)	11.9 (53.4)	14.6 (58.3)	8.2 (46.8)
Record low °C (°F)	5.8 (42.4)	5.0 (41.0)	0.1 (32.2)	−3.7 (25.3)	−6.2 (20.8)	−8.9 (16.0)	−9.4 (15.1)	−7.7 (18.1)	−5.0 (23.0)	−2.7 (27.1)	−0.6 (30.9)	2.8 (37.0)	−9.4 (15.1)
Average precipitation mm (inches)	86.5 (3.41)	77.0 (3.03)	56.8 (2.24)	39.0 (1.54)	41.8 (1.65)	46.2 (1.82)	42.8 (1.69)	39.6 (1.56)	44.0 (1.73)	63.1 (2.48)	73.3 (2.89)	77.4 (3.05)	686.9 (27.04)

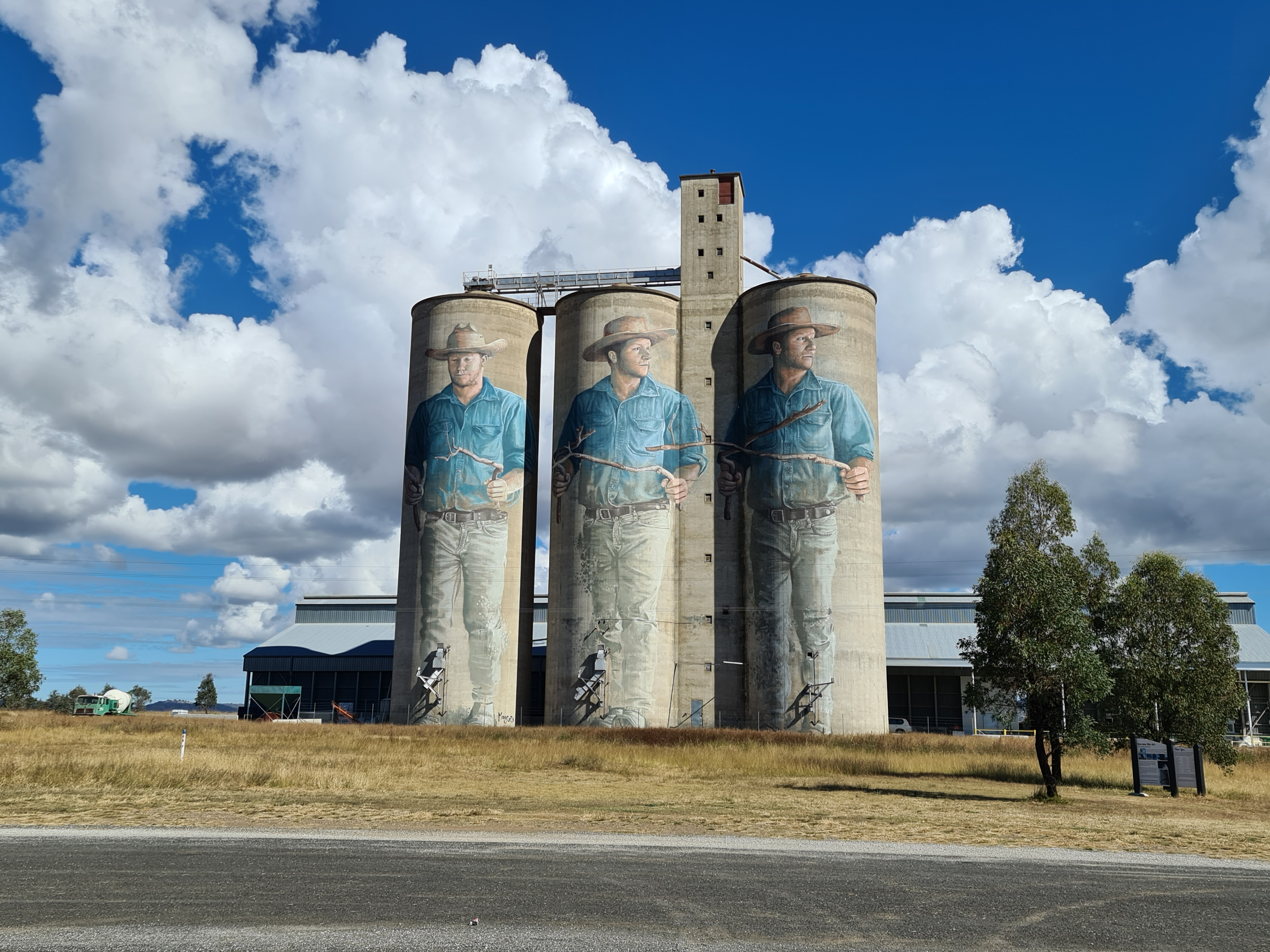
Murals on silos

The weather station at Barraba Post Office was opened firstly as a rain reporting station in March 1881. It became a full weather station in March 1966, with readings made by a human observer. The position of the weather station behind the post office may have led to incorrect weather data.

=== Notable weather extremes ===
A number of notable or significant weather events have affected the town over the years. These include:

- 1898 – The first known snowstorm to hit the town was reported.
- 7 October 1907 – During the afternoon, a hailstorm passed through the town.
- 6 February 1915 – A severe thunderstorm passed close to the town, affecting properties in the area. It dumped 3 inches of rain in about half an hour, and damaging winds (described as 'cyclonic winds') brought down trees, destroyed sheds and damage to houses.
- 25 February 1955 – The highest daily rainfall total of 194.3 mm was recorded.
- 3 July 1984 – The lowest recorded maximum temperature of 5.8 °C was recorded.
- July 1984 – The second known snowstorm to hit the town was reported.
- 2018 to 2020 - The fourth major drought which has affected farmers and the split rock dam lowered its water levels

== Water supply ==
Prior to the construction of the Split Rock Dam Pipeline, the water supply for the town was usually taken from the Manilla River, the Barraba Creek and Connors Creek Dam. When these sources dwindle, Barraba depends on emergency bores.

Approval was given in 2012 for the construction of the pipeline from Split Rock Dam. The dam, which was built in 1988, already had a draw valve in the wall in preparation for the pipeline to Barraba. The pipeline and associated capital works were completed in December 2015.

== Barraba Community Development Committee ==
The Barraba Community Development Committee is a 355 committee of Tamworth Regional Council. This community group has lobbied local, state and federal governments on a number of issues including the Pipeline from Split Rock Dam to Barraba, Woodsreef Mine Rehabilitation and continues to be an effective liaison between the community and Tamworth Regional Council.

== Notable residents ==
- Bill Bright - harpsichord maker
- Clive Crowley – soldier
- Grace Crowley – artist
- Shaun Faulkner – winner of the fourth season of The Mole in 2003
- Rupert Richardson – artist who among other things collaborated on the decoration of Bright's harpsichords
- Cassie Batten (Burrows)- Activist for medicinal cannabis, achieved laws to be changed for her epileptic son in Victoria. Also the cousin of Shaun Faulkner, winner of The Mole, 2003
- Andrew Farriss - INXS founding band member, singer/songwriter, country singer
