= Keepit Dam =

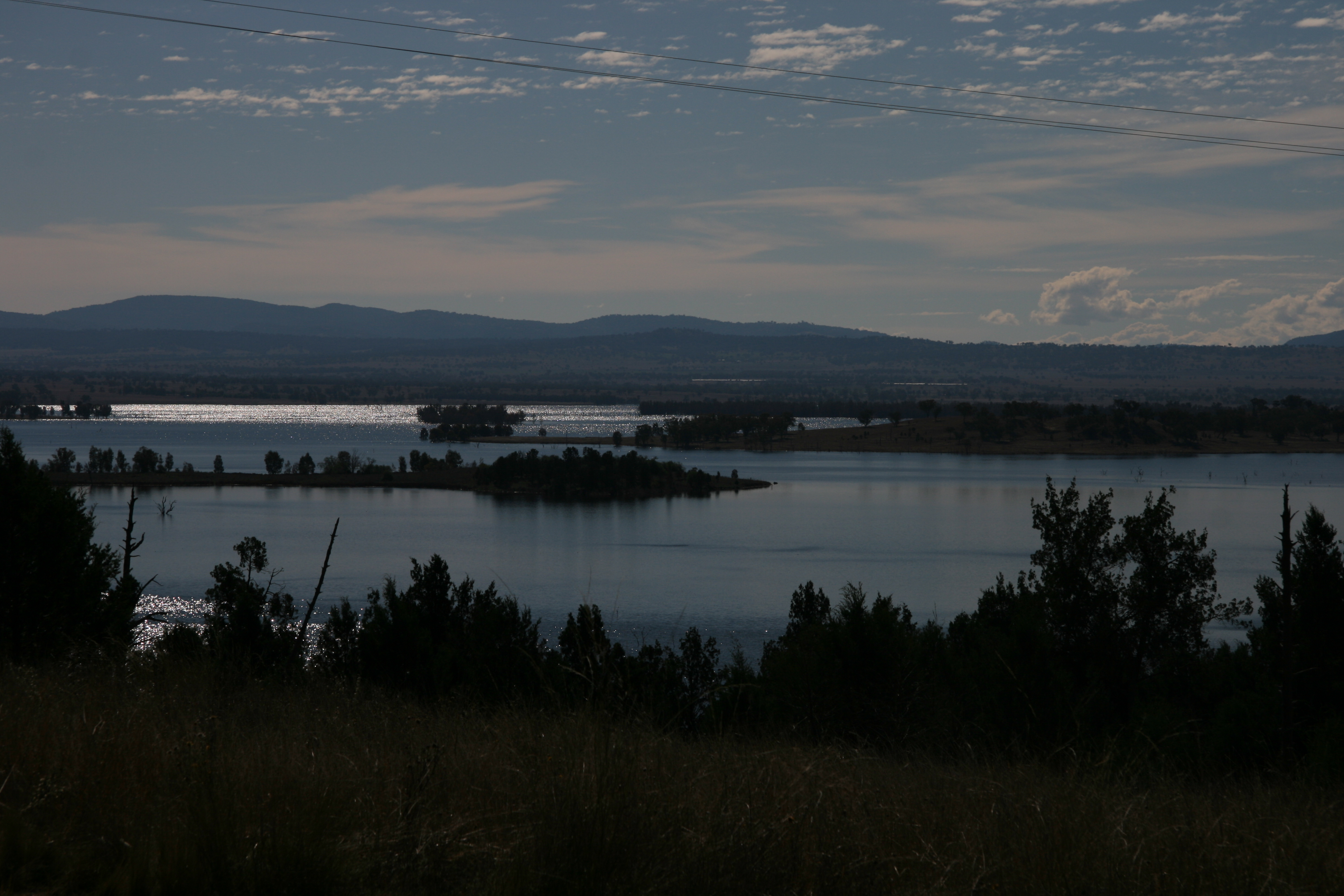
- Vista of Lake Keepit at 100% capacity, 2012.

- Location of Keepit Dam in New South Wales
- Country: Australia
- Location: North West Slopes, New South Wales
- Coordinates: 30°52′54″S 150°30′04″E
- Purpose: Flood mitigation, hydro-power, irrigation, water supply and conservation
- Status: Operational
- Construction began: 1939
- Opening date: 1960
- Owner: WaterNSW

Dam and spillways
- Type of dam: Gravity dam
- Impounds: Namoi River
- Height: 55 metres (180 ft)
- Length: 533 metres (1,749 ft)
- Spillways: 7
- Spillway type: Central gated overflow crest and six radial gates
- Spillway capacity: 10,480 cubic metres per second (370,000 cu ft/s)

Reservoir
- Creates: Lake Keepit
- Total capacity: 425,510 megalitres (15,027×10^{6} cu ft)
- Catchment area: 5,700 square kilometres (2,200 sq mi)
- Surface area: 4,370 hectares (10,800 acres)
- Maximum water depth: 48 metres (157 ft)
- Normal elevation: 329.6 metres (1,081 ft) AHD

Power Station
- Operator: Eraring Energy
- Commission date: 1960
- Type: Conventional
- Turbines: 1
- Installed capacity: 7.2 megawatts (9,700 hp)
- Annual generation: 10.2 gigawatt-hours (37 TJ)
- Website; Keepit Dam at www.waternsw.com.au

Keepit Dam is a major gated mass concrete gravity dam with an earth fill abutment and a central gated concrete overflow crest and six radial gate spillways across the Namoi River upstream of its junction with the Peel River in the North West Slopes region of New South Wales, Australia. The dam's purpose includes flood mitigation, hydro-power, irrigation, water supply and conservation. The impounded reservoir is called Lake Keepit.

== Location and features ==
Commenced in 1939, with construction halted during World War II, and completed in 1960, the Keepit Dam is a major dam on the Namoi River, located approximately 56 kilometres (35 mi) west of Tamworth and 39 kilometres (24 mi) north-east of Gunnedah, upstream of the confluence of the Namoi and Peel rivers. The dam was built by the New South Wales Water Conservation & Irrigation Commission to supply water for irrigation, flood mitigation and potable water for the town of Walgett.

The dam wall height is 55 metres (180 ft) and is 533 metres (1,749 ft) long. The maximum water depth is 48 metres (157 ft) and at 100% capacity the dam wall holds back 425,510 megalitres (15,027×10^{6} cu ft) of water at 329.6 metres (1,081 ft) AHD. The surface area of Lake Keepit is 4,370 hectares (10,800 acres) and the catchment area is 5,700 square kilometres (2,200 sq mi). The central gated overflow crest and six radial gates of the spillway are capable of discharging 10,480 cubic metres per second (370,000 cu ft/s). An A$146.6 million upgrade of facilities commenced in 2009 and resulted in the construction of two spillways and three saddle dams, completed during 2011. A further upgrade is due to commence in 2014 for completion by 2016 that will involve raising the height of the main dam wall by 3.4 metres (11 ft) and enhancing post tension in the concrete section of the wall.

Keepit Dam is operated in conjunction with Split Rock Dam. The two dams supply water requirements along much of the Namoi Valley, used for irrigation including cotton, cereal and wheat crops, lucerne, fodder and pasture, vegetables, vines, orchards and oil seeds.

=== Power generation ===
A hydro-electric power station generates up to 7.2 megawatts (9,700 hp) of electricity from the flow of the water leaving Keepit Dam with an average output of 10.2 gigawatt-hours (37 TJ) per annum. The station was completed in 1960 and upgraded in 1983. The facility is managed by Meridian Energy.

== Etymology ==
The name Keepit originates after a riverside property called Keypit or Keepit, resumed for part of the storage area. The word probably means 'keep it', a derogatory remark about the apparent worthlessness of the pastoral run.

== Recreation ==
The area surrounding Lake Keepit is used for local recreation including camping, picnics, swimming, boating, sailing, water skiing and fishing. The lakeshore is the location of Lake Keepit Soaring Club, the second largest gliding club by membership in Australia.

== See also ==
- Chaffey Dam
- Meridian Energy
- Irrigation in Australia
- List of dams and reservoirs in New South Wales
- Split Rock Dam
