= Kootingal, New South Wales =

Kootingal
- Town
- Coordinates: 31°03′S 151°03′E
- Country: Australia
- State: New South Wales
- LGA: Tamworth Regional Council
- Location: 474 km (295 mi) from Sydney; 20 km (12 mi) from Tamworth

Government
  - State electorate: Tamworth,
  - Federal division: New England
- Elevation: 452 m (1,483 ft)

Population
  - Total: 2,313 (2021 census)
- Postcode: 2352
- County: Inglis

Kootingal is a town in New South Wales, Australia in the Tamworth Regional Council area. It is commonly called a satellite suburb of Tamworth because of its closeness and the fact that its residents use Tamworth's services. Founded as an Aboriginal mission, Kootingal traces its name roots to the local Aboriginal Kamilaroi language. At the 2021 census, Kootingal had a population of 2,313 people.

It is an agricultural based town, with lucerne, fruit, vegetable, chicken and egg farms. It is nestled in a small rich alluvial valley in the Moonbi Range, part of the Great Dividing Range. Kootingal is located on the northern bank of a bend in the Cockburn River. Kootingal is located between the villages of Moonbi to the north and Nemingha to the south. It is located 474 km north west of Sydney and 20 km north east of Tamworth on the New England Highway.

Kootingal holds an annual Pumpkin Festival and Outdoor Leisure Show in April at the Kootingal sports ground. There are a variety of stalls and the show is suitable for all ages.

== Heritage listings ==
Kootingal has a number of heritage-listed sites, including:

- New England Highway: Moonby House

== Community facilities ==
- Caravan Park
- Catholic and Anglican Churches
- Kootingal Public School
- Moonbi House Retirement Village
- Police Station
- Post Office
- Railway Station
- Swimming Pool
- Sportsground
- Tennis Courts
- War Memorial Hall, Library and Pre-School

== Transport ==
Kootingal station is situated on the Main North railway line. Trains no longer continue all the way to the Queensland border, but the town is still served twice daily by the NSW TrainLink Xplorer service between Sydney and Armidale in both directions. This station is less than 20 minutes drive from Tamworth.

Tamworth Buslines operates a bus service between Kootingal, Bendemeer and Tamworth.

== Scouts ==
Kootingal has a Scout group in combination with the village of Moonbi. The Kootingal-Moonbi Scout group consists of Joey Scouts, Cub Scouts and Scouts. It is a thriving Group and enjoys many activities.
