= Danglemah, New South Wales =

Locality in New South Wales

Danglemah is a bounded rural locality in the New England (New South Wales) region of Australia.

== Locality ==
Danglemah is on Jamiesons Creek, a tributary of the Peel River nestled between mountains such as Flaggy Mountain (984m) and Cooee Mountain (1019m) in the Moonbi Ranges, of the Great Dividing Range, and is halfway between the towns of Tamworth and Walcha.

Located at 30°59′54″S 151°10′04″E Danglemah is about 320 km north of Sydney; and 14 km east of the village of Bendemeer, New South Wales. Danglemah is a Civil Parish in the County of Inglis.

The elevation is about 655m above sea level.

== History ==
The original inhabitants of the land were Aboriginal people of the Kamilaroi clan.

William Dangar and Edward Gostwyck Cory explored the area around Danglemah in 1830. In 1832 Edward Gostwyck Cory cut a track over the Moonbi range that the existing highway has generally followed. By 1834 the first squatters began farming the area.

Danglemah is the site of a closed railway platform on the Main North railway line in New South Wales, Australia. The platform was open between 1897 and 1985, initially as Jamieson's Siding, being renamed in 1918.

== Notable residents ==
- Barnaby Joyce

Preceding station	Former services	Following station
Woolbrook towards Wallangarra	Main Northern Line	Limbri towards Sydney
