= Namoi River =

River in New South Wales, Australia

Coordinates: 30°00′S 148°07′E

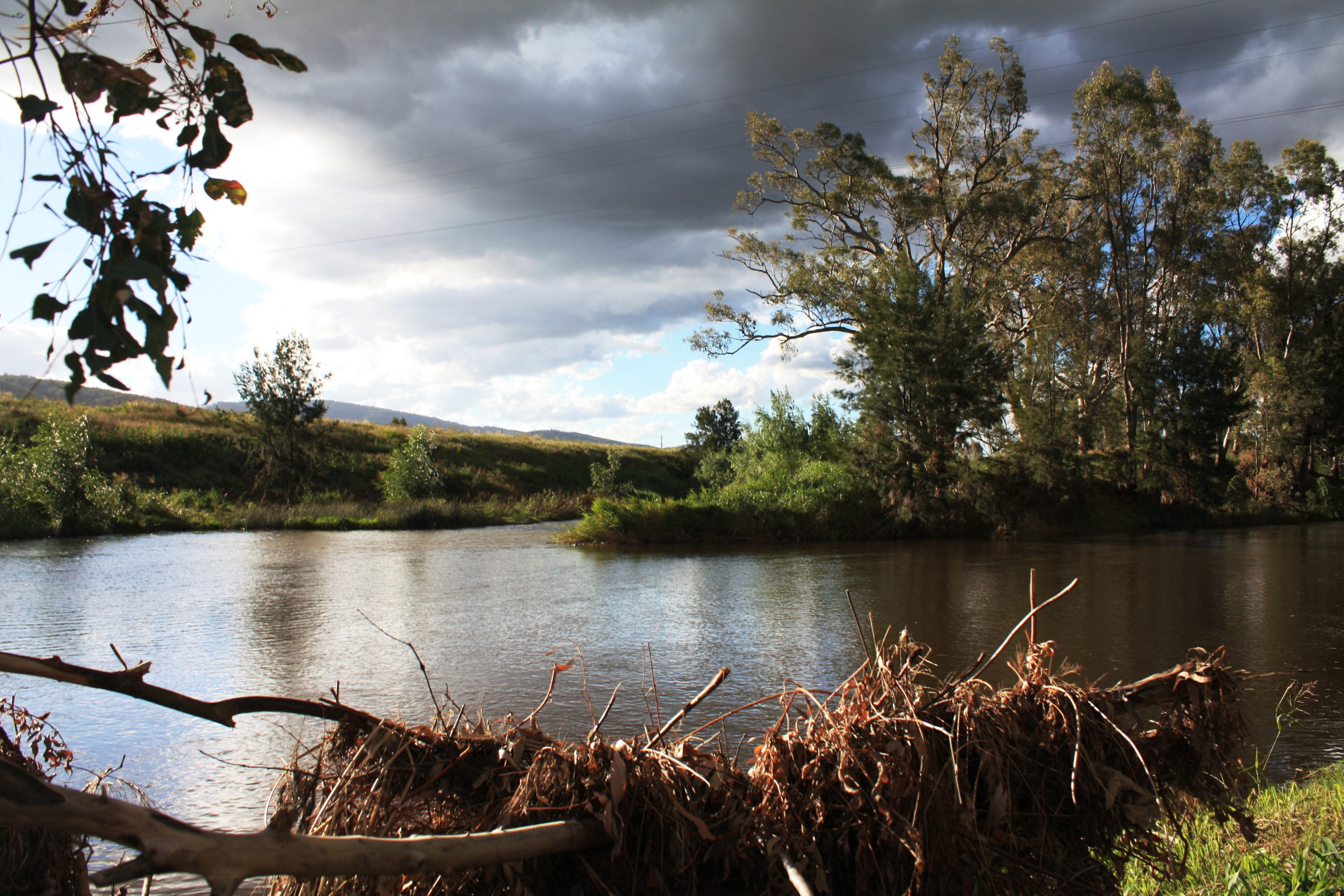
- The confluence of the Namoi and Manilla rivers, at Manilla
- Etymology: Aboriginal: 1. derived from the name for a species of acacia; 2. derived from ngamu, the Gamilaraay word for "breast"

Location
- Country: Australia
- State: New South Wales
- Region: IBRA: New England Tablelands
- District: Northern Tablelands, North West Slopes
- Municipalities: Narrabri, Walgett, Gunnedah

Physical characteristics
- Source: Moonbi Range, Great Dividing Range
  - location: Near Niangala
  - elevation: 708 m (2,323 ft)
- 2nd source: Macdonald River
- Source confluence: Boundary Creek
- Mouth: Confluence with the Barwon River
  - location: Near Walgett
  - elevation: 130 m (430 ft)
- Length: 708 km (440 mi)
- Basin size: 43,000 km^{2} (17,000 sq mi)
- Discharge
  - average: 25 m^{3}/s (880 cu ft/s)

Basin features
- River system: Barwon River, Murray–Darling basin
- Reservoirs: Lake Keepit, Baraneal Lagoon

The Namoi River, a major perennial river that is part of the Barwon catchment of the Murray–Darling basin, is located in the Northern Tablelands and North West Slopes districts of New South Wales, Australia.

The Namoi River rises on the western slopes of the Moonbi Range and Great Dividing Range, near Niangala, at the convergence of the Macdonald River and Boundary Creek, and flows generally west, joined by twenty-seven tributaries, including the Peel, Manilla and Mooki rivers, before reaching its confluence with the Barwon River, near Walgett.

The Namoi River descends 578 metres (1,896 ft) over its 708 kilometres (440 mi) course; passing near the towns of Gunnedah, Boggabri, Narrabri, Wee Waa and Walgett. The flow of the river is impounded by Lake Keepit and Baraneal Lagoon.

== Course ==
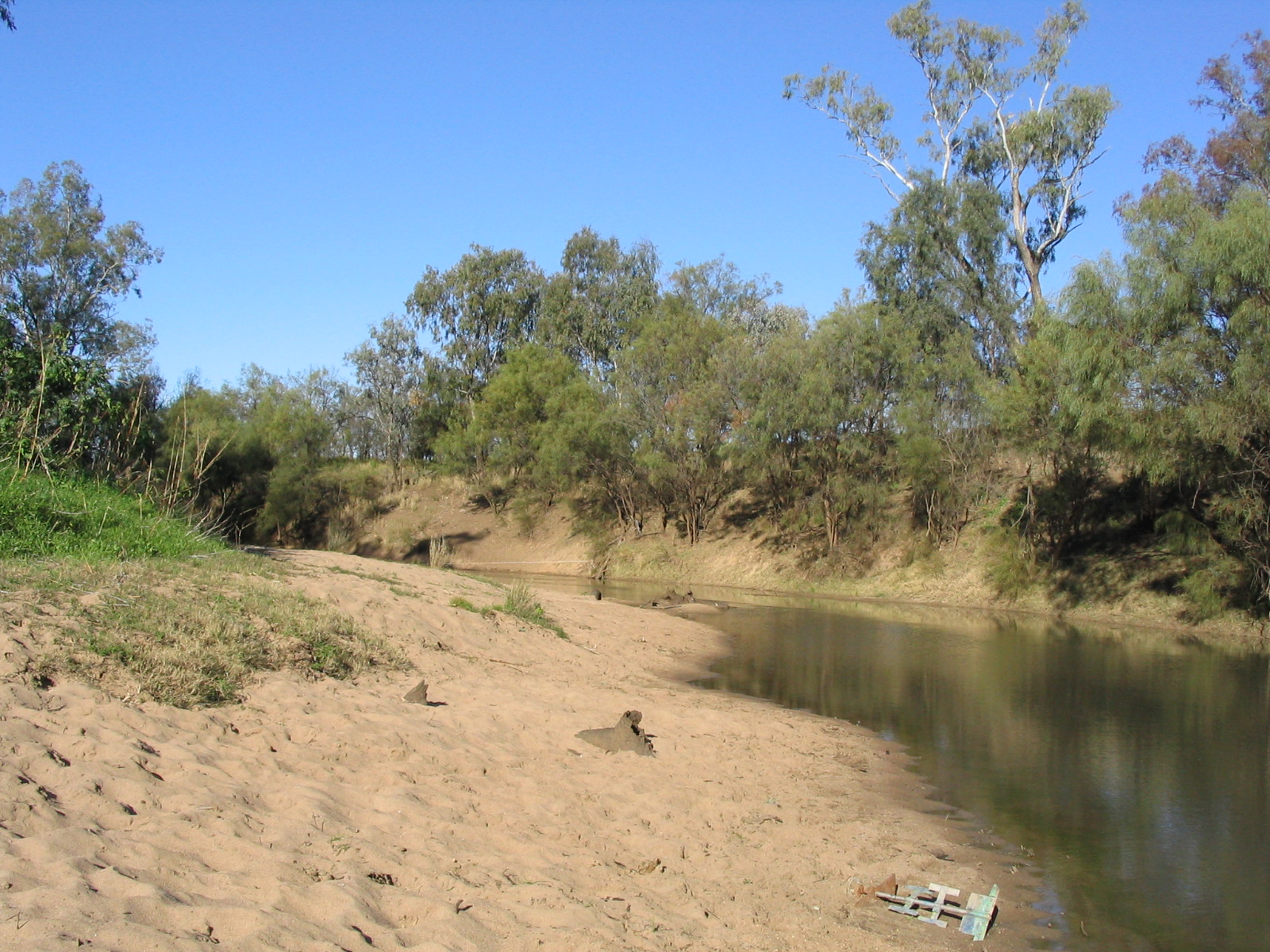
A sand bar and the banks of the Namoi River near Cuttabri.

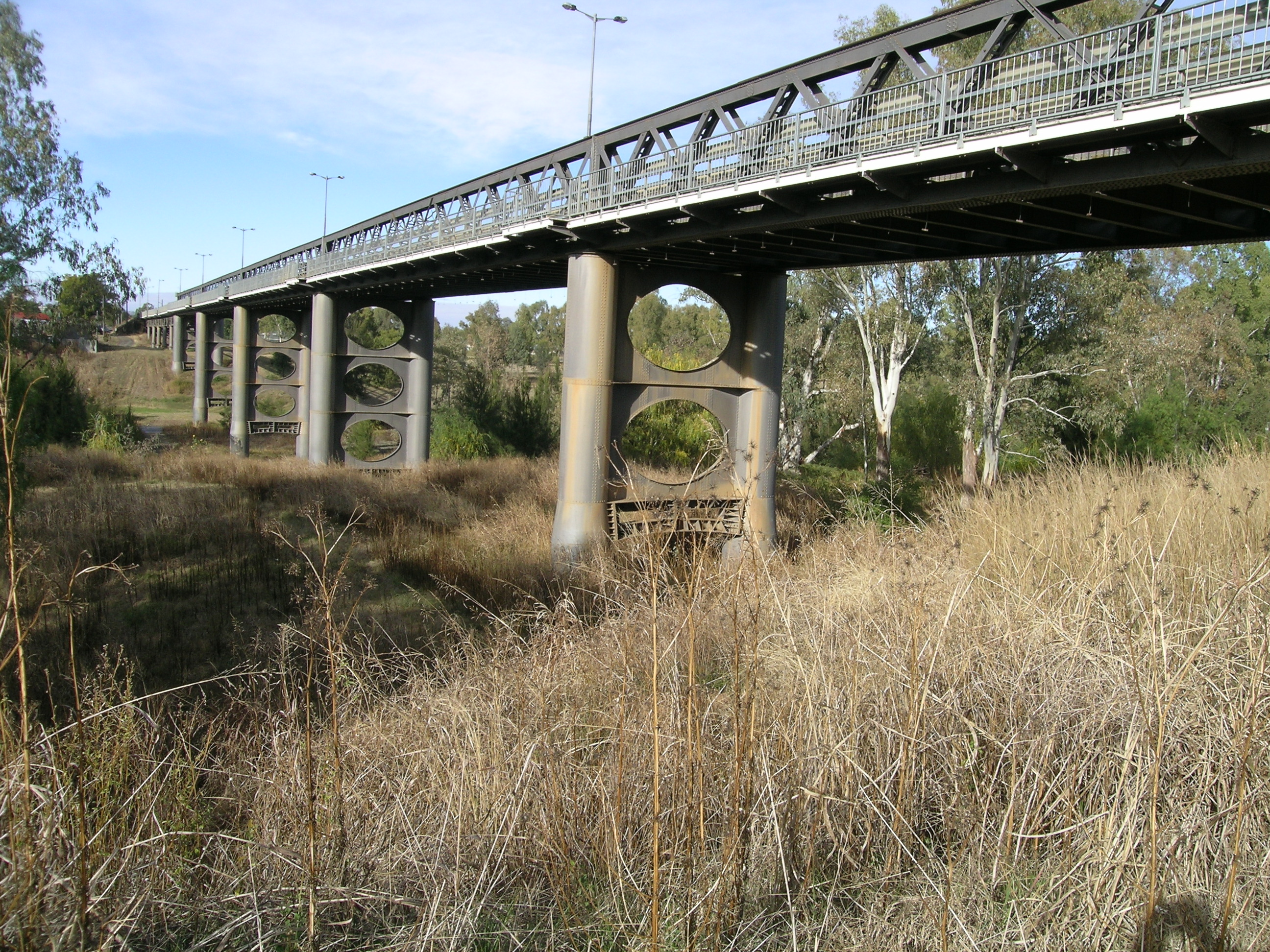
Bridge over the Namoi River, Manilla.

The headwaters of the Namoi, including the Macdonald River, the Peel River, the Cockburn River and the Manilla River, rise on the western slopes of the Great Dividing Range on the Northern Tablelands. Other smaller tributaries include Cobrabald River, Coxs Creek, Maules Creek, Mooki River and Bundock Creek. It rises east of Niangala and flows generally north west after its confluence with its major tributary, the Cobrabald River, then passes through the villages of Woolbrook and Bendemeer. It continues to flow westward to where it changes name to the Namoi River at Boundary Creek just east of where the river enters Warrabah National Park.

The Namoi flows past Manilla, where it is joined by the Manilla River. After passing into Keepit Dam it is joined by the Peel River before passing by Carroll, then joined by the Mooki River near Gunnedah on the Liverpool Plains. From here it flows north-westwards past Boggabri, Narrabri, Wee Waa and Burren Junction and eventually joins the Barwon River, near the town of Walgett.

Keepit Dam near Gunnedah is an important dam for flood control and irrigation. The floodplains of the lower Namoi around Wee Waa are an important area for growing cotton which is irrigated using water from the dam.

== History ==
The traditional custodians of the land surrounding the Namoi River are the Aboriginal people of the Kamilaroi nation. The word namoi or nammoy is believed to be the native name for a species of acacia; and ngamu is a Gamilaraay word for "breast". Alternative meanings of the name include Aboriginal words for "forked stick" and "meeting of the waters".

Allan Cunningham, a botanist-explorer, in 1827 became the first European to explore the Namoi River. Cunningham named this river "Mitchell" in honour of James Mitchell, the chief surgeon of Sydney Hospital, out of gratitude for his assistance with barometrical observations.

The Namoi River Road Bridge, which was built at Manilla in 1886, has been placed on the Register of the National Estate. This bridge has eleven metal lattice truss spans and is one of the longest six or seven metal truss bridges completed in Australia by that time.

== Fauna ==
The Namoi supports a wide range of fish and crustaceans, which include Murray cod, yellowbelly, silver perch, catfish (Tandanus tandanus) as well as yabbies (Cherax destructor). "Crawbob" is a regional name and may be called a "yabby" elsewhere in the state.

Murray cod in the Namoi grow to a very large size, with fish of forty kilograms or larger being not uncommon. European carp and extensive irrigation practices have had adverse impact on the native fish population over the last forty years, and restocking programs have been undertaken, mainly by volunteers, to ensure the survival of the native fish population.

The Namoi River snapping turtle or Bell's turtle (Elseya belli) is a species of turtle found only in the upper reaches of the Namoi River, Gwydir and Macdonald rivers on the North West Slopes.

The platypus (Ornithorhynchus anatinus) is found in this river and can often be seen around Warrabah National Park, east of Manilla.

== See also ==
- Rivers of New South Wales
- List of rivers of Australia
