= Limbri, New South Wales =

Limbri
- Town
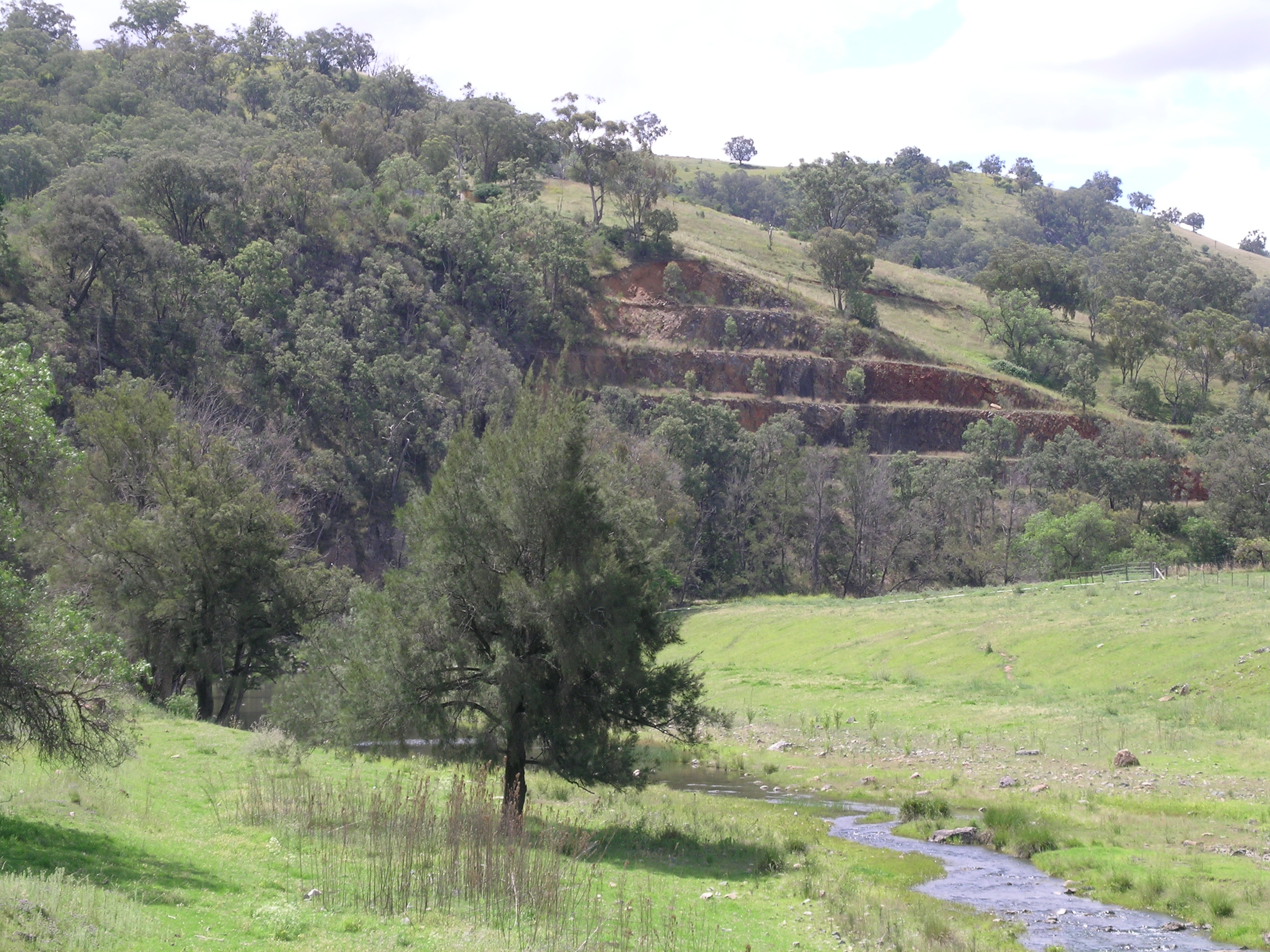
- Swamp Oak Creek and the rail cutting at Limbri

- Coordinates: 31°03′S 151°09′E
- Country: Australia
- State: New South Wales
- LGA: Tamworth Regional Council
- Location: 450 km (280 mi) from Sydney; 30 km (19 mi) from Tamworth

Government
  - State electorate: Tamworth, Northern Tablelands
  - Federal division: New England
- Elevation: 477 m (1,565 ft)

Population
  - Total: 259 (2006 census)
- Postcode: 2352
- County: Inglis

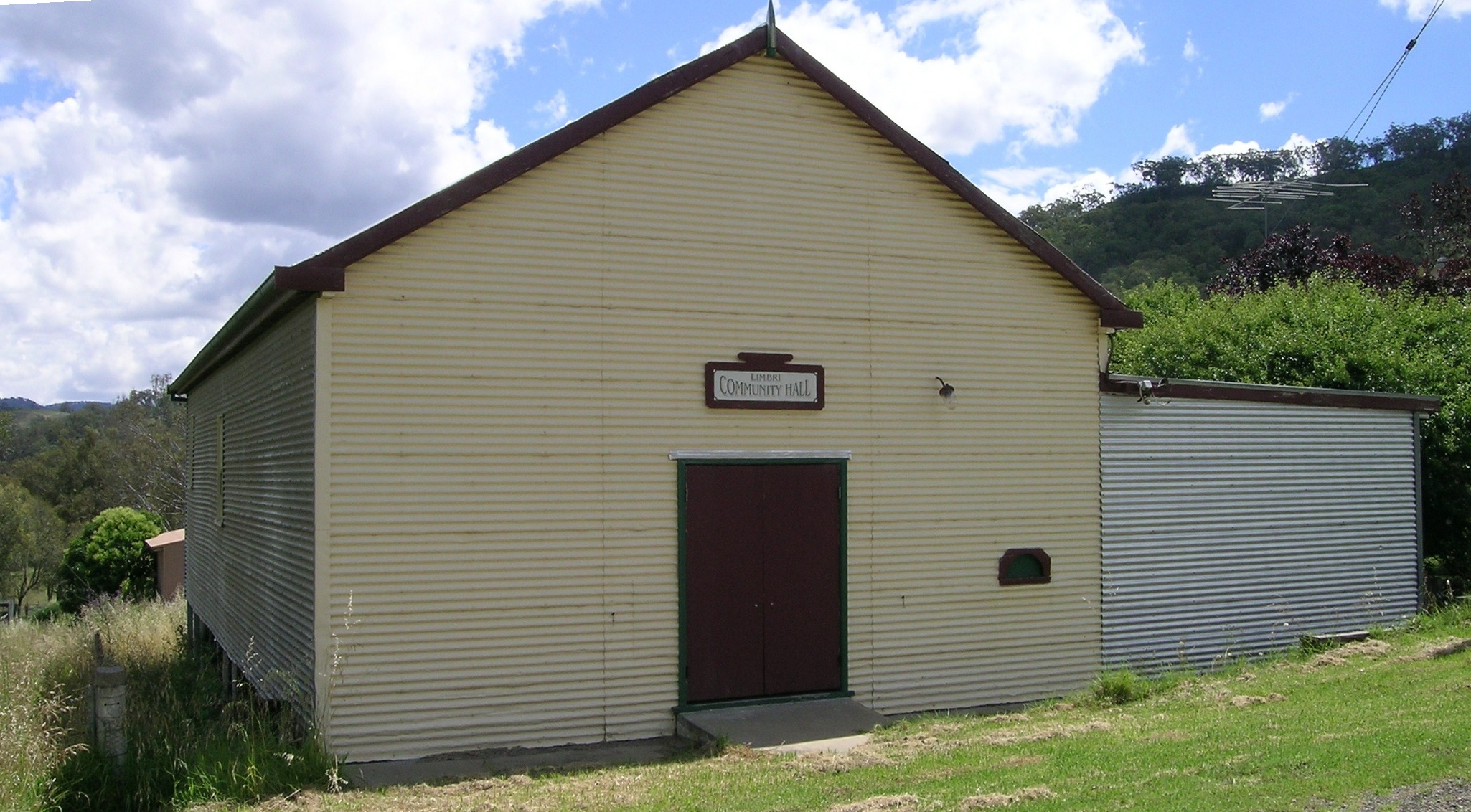
Community hall, Limbri, NSW

Limbri is a small village on Swamp Oak Creek, about 30 km east northeast of Tamworth and about 8 km east southeast of Moonbi in northern New South Wales, Australia. The population of the Limbri region in 2006 was 259.

Some alluvial gold was found at Limbri. It is now an agricultural based village, with sheep and cattle breeding the main pursuits.

Limbri public school opened in 1900 to serve the surrounding grazing properties and celebrated its centenary, but it is now closed. The general store that was there has also now closed. The region has the services of Limbri Landcare Group and Limbri/Mulla Creek Rural Fire Service.

== Limbri railway station ==
The station at Limbri on the Main North railway line to Armidale opened in 1885 as Farquarsons Siding. On 14 December 1893 it was renamed Limbri, but it has now been closed for a number of years. Limbri Tunnel is 300 m north east of the station site

Preceding station	Former services	Following station
Danglemah towards Wallangarra	Main Northern Line	Kootingal towards Sydney
