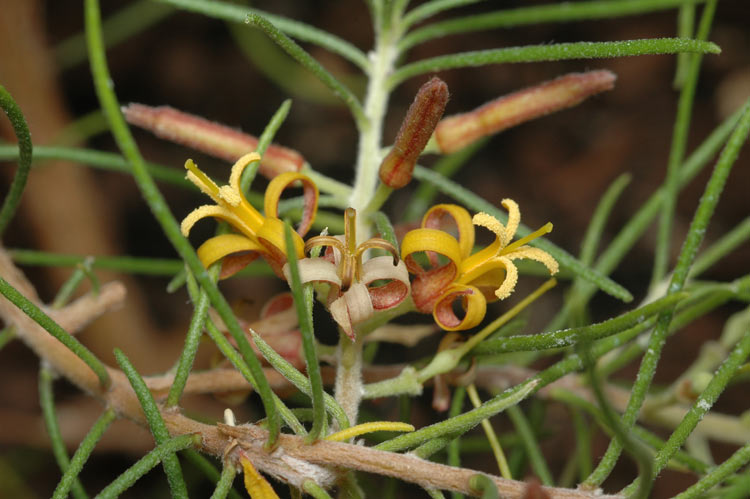
- In the Australian National Botanic Gardens

Scientific classification
- Kingdom: Plantae
- Clade: Embryophytes
- Clade: Tracheophytes
- Clade: Spermatophytes
- Clade: Angiosperms
- Clade: Eudicots
- Order: Proteales
- Family: Proteaceae
- Genus: Persoonia
- Species: P. fastigiata

Binomial name
- Persoonia fastigiata R.Br.
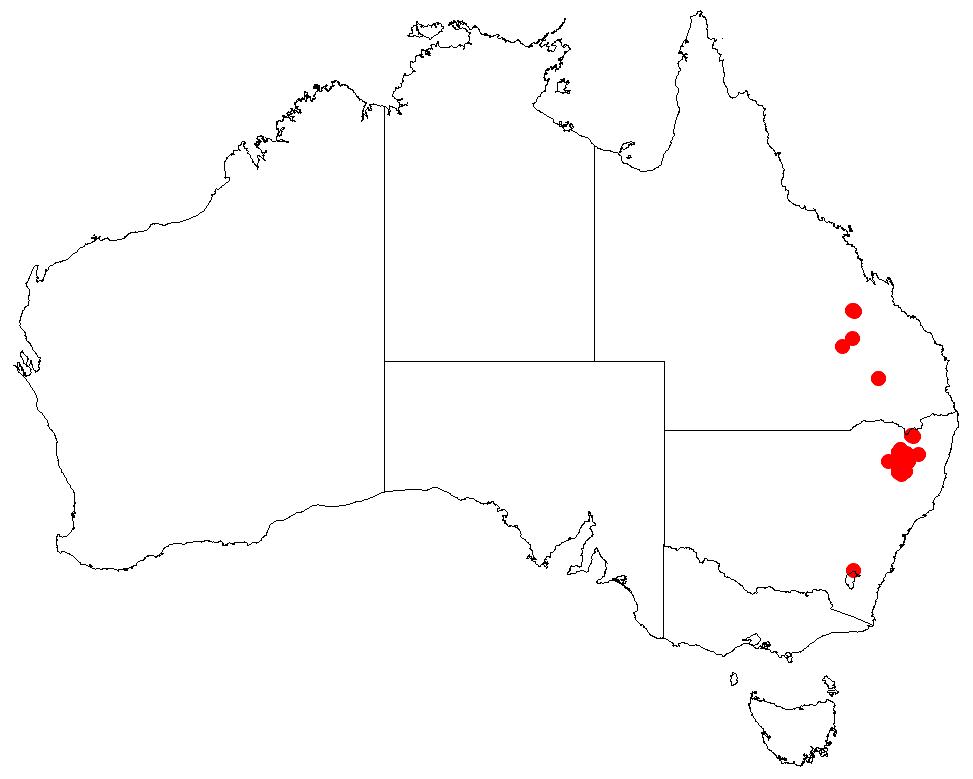
- Occurrence data from Australasian Virtual Herbarium

Synonyms
- Linkia fastigiata (R.Br.) Kuntze

= Persoonia fastigiata =

Species of flowering plant

Persoonia fastigiata is a plant in the family Proteaceae and is endemic to the Northern Tablelands of New South Wales. It is a small, erect to spreading shrub with linear leaves and hairy flowers arranged singly or in groups of up to five on a rachis up to 10 mm (0.39 in) long.

== Description ==
Persoonia fastigiata is an erect to spreading shrub that typically grows to a height of 0.5–1.5 m (1 ft 8 in – 4 ft 11 in) with smooth bark and hairy young branches. The leaves are mostly linear, 15–40 mm (0.59–1.57 in) long, 0.7–1 mm (0.028–0.039 in) wide and hairy when young. The flowers are arranged singly or in groups of up to five along a rachis 1–10 mm (0.039–0.394 in) long, each flower on a hairy pedicel 5–8 mm (0.20–0.31 in) long. The tepals are 9–10 mm (0.35–0.39 in) long and moderately hairy on the outside. Flowering mainly occurs from December to January.

== Taxonomy and naming ==
Persoonia fastigiata was first formally described in 1830 by Robert Brown in Supplementum primum Prodromi florae Novae Hollandiae from specimens collected near Port Jackson by Charles Fraser.

== Distribution and habitat ==
This geebung grows in woodland and forest on the Northern Tablelands between Glen Innes, the Moonbi Range and adjacent areas to the west, at altitudes between 800 and 1,200 m (2,600 and 3,900 ft).
