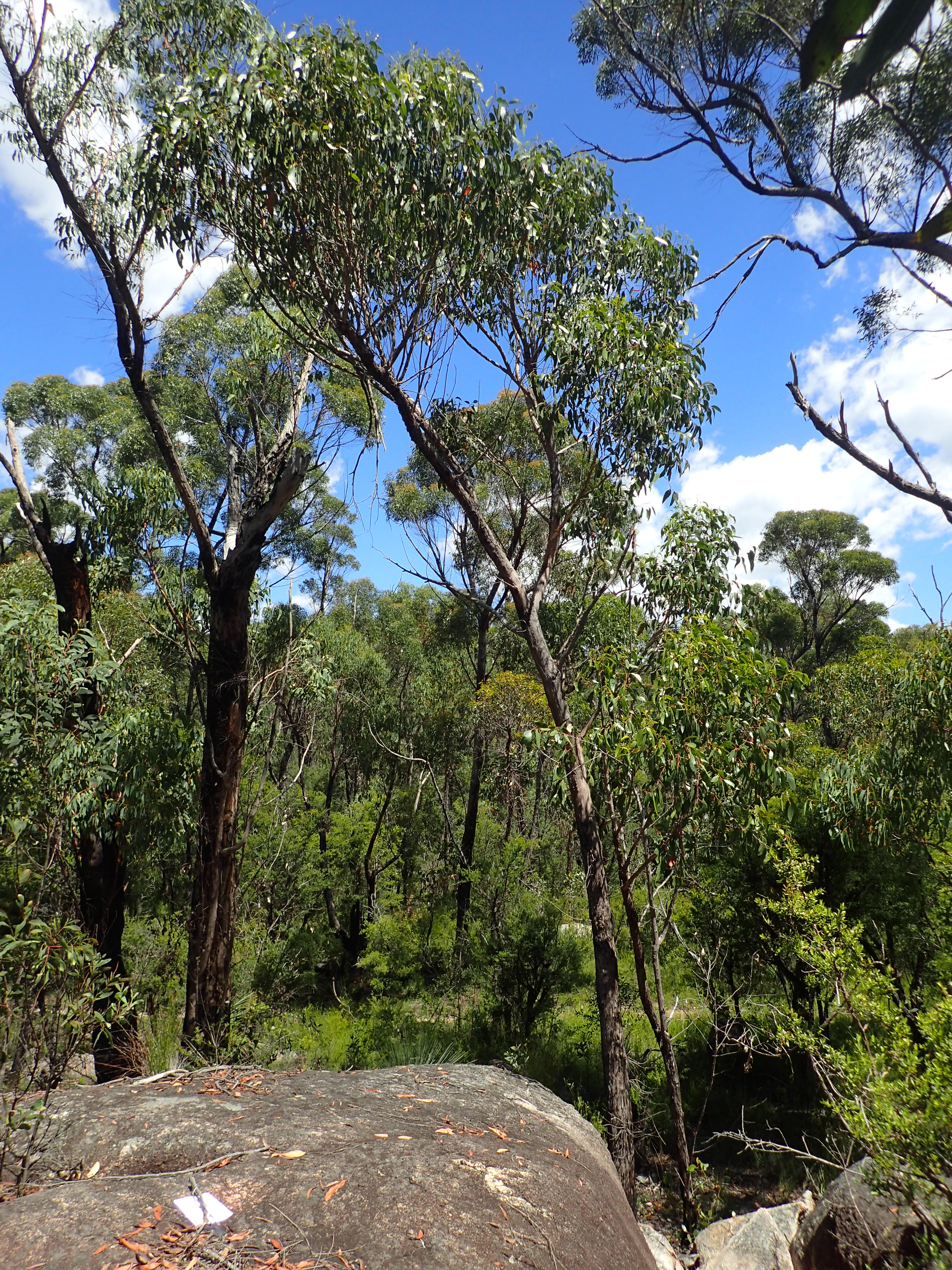
- Eucalyptus williamsiana in the Gibraltar Range National Park

Scientific classification
- Kingdom: Plantae
- Clade: Tracheophytes
- Clade: Angiosperms
- Clade: Eudicots
- Clade: Rosids
- Order: Myrtales
- Family: Myrtaceae
- Genus: Eucalyptus
- Species: E. williamsiana

Binomial name
- Eucalyptus williamsiana L.A.S.Johnson & K.D.Hill

= Eucalyptus williamsiana =

Large-leaved stringybark

Species of eucalyptus

Eucalyptus williamsiana, commonly known as the large-leaved stringybark, is a species of small to medium-sized tree that is endemic to northern New South Wales. It has rough, stringy bark on the trunk and branches, broadly lance-shaped adult leaves, flower buds in groups of seven, white flowers and hemispherical fruit.

== Description ==
Eucalyptus williamsiana is a tree that typically grows to a height of 20 m (66 ft) but often less, and forms a lignotuber. Young plants and coppice regrowth have thick, egg-shaped to elliptical leaves that are 60–125 mm (2.4–4.9 in) long and 30–75 mm (1.2–3.0 in) wide. Adult leaves are the same shade of glossy green on both sides, broadly lance-shaped to curved, 90–180 mm (3.5–7.1 in) long and 20–50 mm (0.79–1.97 in) wide on a petiole 15–27 mm (0.59–1.06 in) long. The flower buds are arranged in leaf axils in groups of seven on an unbranched peduncle 5–10 mm (0.20–0.39 in) long, the individual buds sessile or on pedicels up to 2 mm (0.079 in) long. Mature buds are oval to spindle-shaped, 7–10 mm (0.28–0.39 in) long and 5–6 mm (0.20–0.24 in) wide with a conical operculum. Flowering has been recorded from January to February and the flowers are white. The fruit is a woody hemispherical capsule 5–8 mm (0.20–0.31 in) long and 10–15 mm (0.39–0.59 in) wide with the valves near rim level.

== Taxonomy and naming ==
Eucalyptus williamsiana was first formally described in 1990 by Lawrie Johnson and Ken Hill from specimens collected near the western edge of the Gibraltar Range National Park in 1985. The specific epithet (williamsiana) honours "J.B." Williams for his contribution to knowledge of the flora of the New England region.

== Distribution and habitat ==
The large-leaved stringybark grows in woodland on the eastern side of the Northern Tablelands between Wallangarra in southern Queensland and Niangala in New South Wales. There is also a weakly naturalised population near Googong on the Southern Tablelands.
