= Cooee Mountain =

Cooee Mountain may refer to:

- Cooee Mountain (Queensland) in the Glass House Mountains
- Cooee Mountain (New South Wales) in the Moonbi Ranges
