= Macdonald River (Bendemeer) =

River in New South Wales, Australia

Coordinates: 30°53′S 151°10′E

Macdonald River Muluerindie
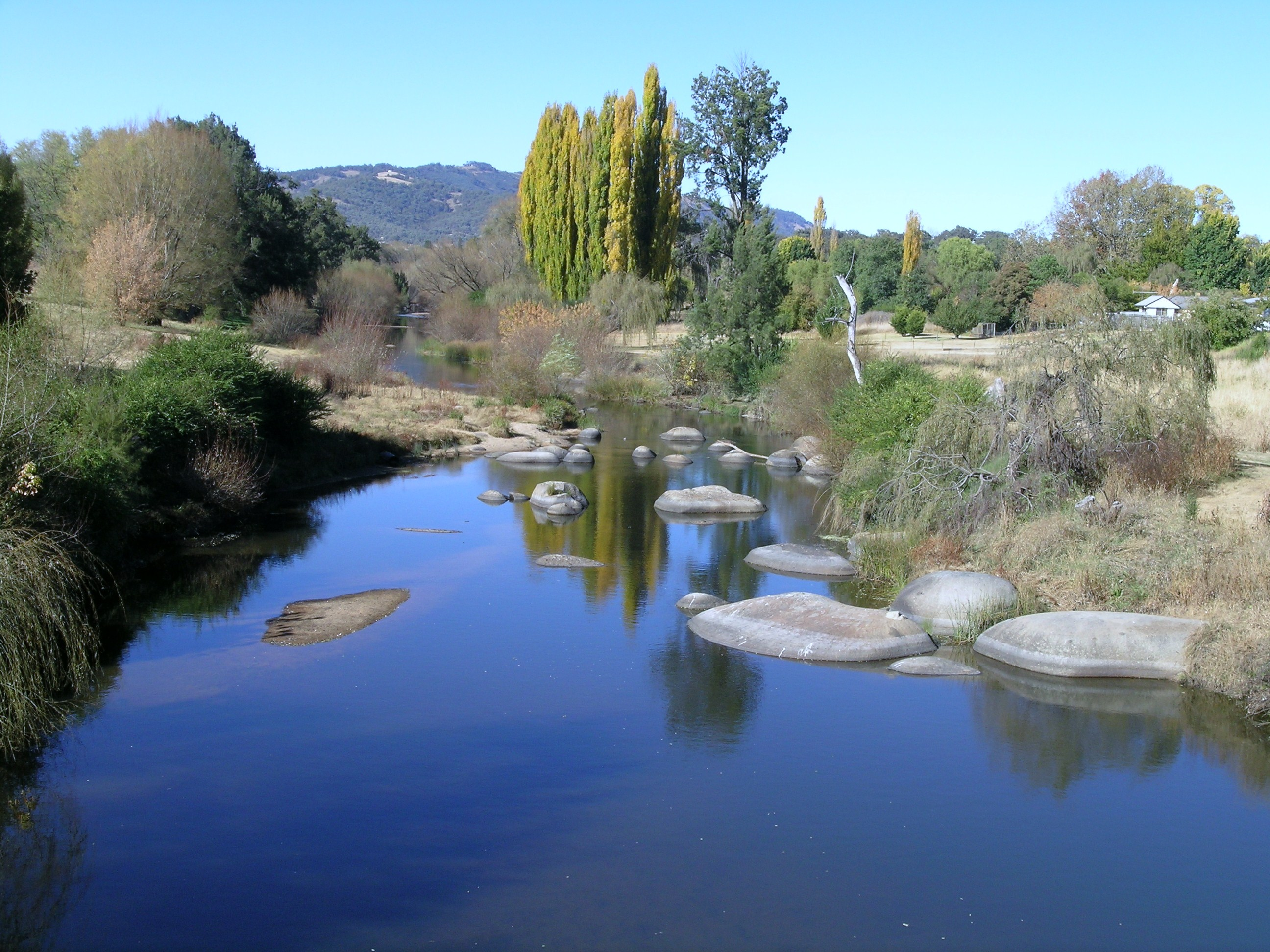
- Macdonald River at Bendemeer
- Etymology: Reputedly named after a Mr H. Macdonald

Location
- Country: Australia
- State: New South Wales
- Region: IBRA: New England Tablelands
- District: Northern Tablelands
- Municipality: Tamworth

Physical characteristics
- Source: Moonbi Range and Great Dividing Range
  - location: east of Niangala
  - elevation: 1,220 m (4,000 ft)
- Mouth: confluence with the Namoi River
  - location: Bald Rock Mountain
  - elevation: 705 m (2,313 ft)
- Length: 169 km (105 mi)

Basin features
- River system: Murray–Darling basin

Macdonald River, a perennial river that is part of the Namoi catchment within the Murray–Darling basin, is located in the Northern Tablelands district of New South Wales, Australia.

== Course and features ==
The river rises east of Niangala on the western slopes of the Moonbi Range and the Great Dividing Range and generally flows north west after its confluence with its major tributary, the Cobrabald River, and flows through Warrabah National Park before reaching its mouth, with the Namoi River; dropping 515 metres (1,690 ft) over its course of 169 kilometres (105 mi).

From source to mouth, the river passes through or near the villages of Woolbrook and Bendemeer.

== Recreation and development ==
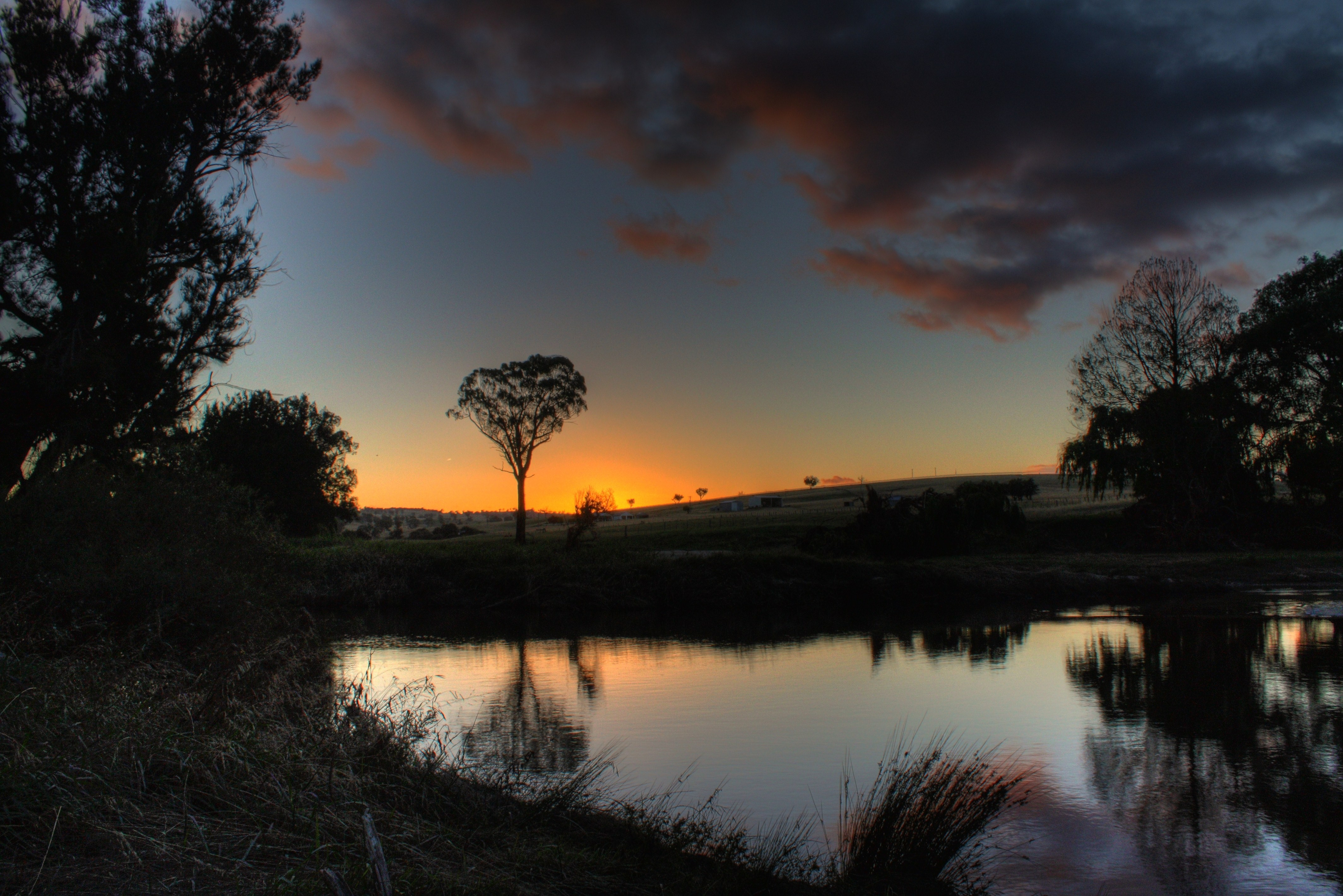
Macdonald River upstream from Woolbrook.

Trout fishing is possible in the waters of the Macdonald River, its creeks and tributaries upstream of the New England Highway road bridge at Bendemeer. The Namoi River snapping turtle or Bell's turtle (Elseya belli) is a species of turtle found only in the upper reaches of the Namoi River, Gwydir River and Macdonald Rivers.

The T A Perry Bridge, that carries the New England Highway and crosses the Macdonald River, was completed in 1985, enabling a bypass of the village of Bendemeer.

In November 2008, torrential rain caused severe flooding in the Macdonald River and led to the area being declared a natural disaster area.

== See also ==
- List of rivers of Australia
- List of rivers of New South Wales (L–Z)
- Rivers of New South Wales
