= Moonby House =

Moonbi House
- Location within New South Wales Location within Australia
- 31°02′34″S 151°03′47″E
- Location: New England Highway, Kootingal, Tamworth Regional Council, New South Wales, Australia

History
- Built: 1895–1896

Site notes
- Architectural style: Federation Filigree
- Owner: Freemasons Institution of NSW

New South Wales Heritage Register
- Official name: Moonbi House; Moonbi Retirement Homes
- Type: State heritage (built)
- Designated: 2 April 1999
- Reference no.: 61
- Type: House
- Category: Residential buildings (private)

Moonbi House is a heritage-listed colonial pastoral station and now retirement village located on the New England Highway in Kootingal in the Tamworth Regional Council local government area of New South Wales, Australia. The house was built from 1895 to 1896. It is also known as Moonbi Retirement Homes. The property is owned by the Freemasons Institution of NSW and was added to the New South Wales State Heritage Register on 2 April 1999.

== History ==
Through the process of "squatting" on Crown land, squatters had occupied most of the Peel Valley and adjacent Moonbi Ranges by the late 1830s.

By 1848 Henry Dangar had formed the "Moonbi" run of 10,240 hectares (25,300 acres). Henry Dangar was company surveyor for the Australian Agricultural Company and was the influencing factor in convincing Edward Parry (company agent for the Australian Agricultural Company) to exchange the coastal and mountainous lands at Port Stephens for the better pastoral lands of the Peel Valley.

Pastoral runs were open range country, with a head station that was the heart of the enterprise. Moonbi House was erected by the Gill family, which had made their money both from mail contracting and from pastoralism. This was the expression of that wealth at the end of the nineteenth century. Robert Alfred Orvill Gill built the house during 1895–96, of double brick made near the river, on the property Tangelwood.

In 1970 Moonbi House was restored by "Artificial Breeders Ltd." who made it the administrative headquarters of a cattle artificial insemination centre.

In 1977 the Masonic Lodge conceived to change it to a retirement village. In 1978 the Freemasons Benevolent Institution of NSW purchased the property to establish the Northern Inland Masonic Retirement Centre - as a residential aged care facility. At the time of the study Moonbi House was still being utilised for that purpose.

== Description ==
It is well-sited with views across the countryside to the Moonbi Ranges. Moonbi House is now located within a retirement village.

Moonbi House has a long driveway leading onto Churchill Drive, included as part of its curtilage.

Moonbi House, constructed between 1895 and 1896, is representative of the development of the pastoral expansion of the Parry Shire, and is also an outstanding example of a pastoral manor house in the Federation Filigree style. It is important to the local community as a landmark item and is associated with the historical figures Henry Dangar (original lease holder) and the Gill Family (original owners of the house). It is also developing additional social and cultural importance associated with its current use as a retirement village.

A substantial and well-detailed house featuring an interesting transitional architectural style.

== Heritage listing ==
Moonbi House was listed on the New South Wales State Heritage Register on 2 April 1999.

== See also ==
- Australian residential architectural styles
