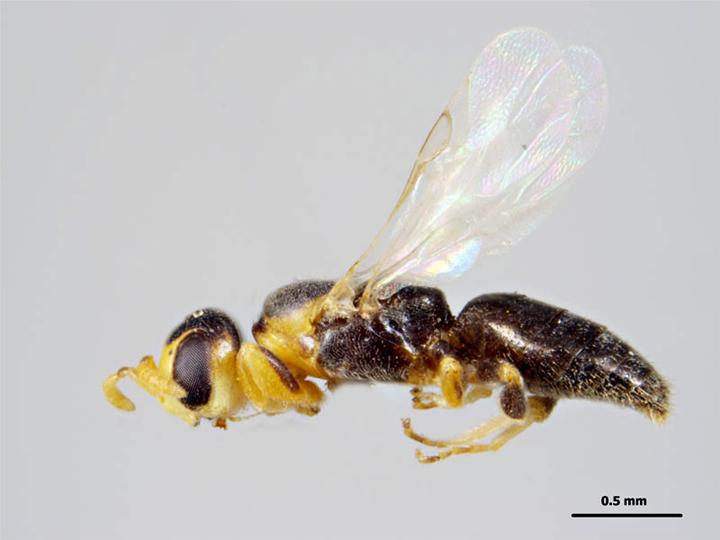
- Male

Scientific classification
- Kingdom: Animalia
- Phylum: Arthropoda
- Clade: Pancrustacea
- Class: Insecta
- Order: Hymenoptera
- Family: Colletidae
- Genus: Euryglossina
- Species: E. moonbiensis

Binomial name
- Euryglossina moonbiensis (Exley, 1968)

Synonyms
- Quasihesma moonbiensis Exley, 1968

= Euryglossina moonbiensis =

Species of bee

Euryglossina moonbiensis, or Euryglossina (Quasihesma) moonbiensis, is a species of bee in the family Colletidae and the subfamily Euryglossinae. It is endemic to Australia. It was described in 1968 by Australian entomologist Elizabeth Exley.

== Distribution and habitat ==
The species occurs in north-eastern Australia. The type locality is the Moonbi Range in the Northern Tablelands of New South Wales. It has also been recorded from Queensland and the Northern Territory.

== Behaviour ==
The adults are flying mellivores. Flowering plants visited by the bees include Angophora, Eucalyptus, Eugenia, Melaleuca and Tristania species.
