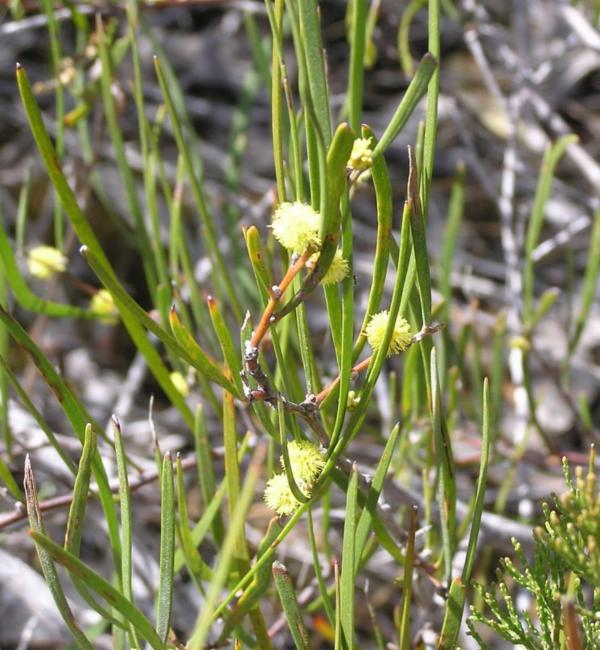
- In Girraween National Park

Scientific classification
- Kingdom: Plantae
- Clade: Tracheophytes
- Clade: Angiosperms
- Clade: Eudicots
- Clade: Rosids
- Order: Fabales
- Family: Fabaceae
- Subfamily: Caesalpinioideae
- Clade: Mimosoid clade
- Genus: Acacia
- Species: A. granitica

Binomial name
- Acacia granitica Maiden
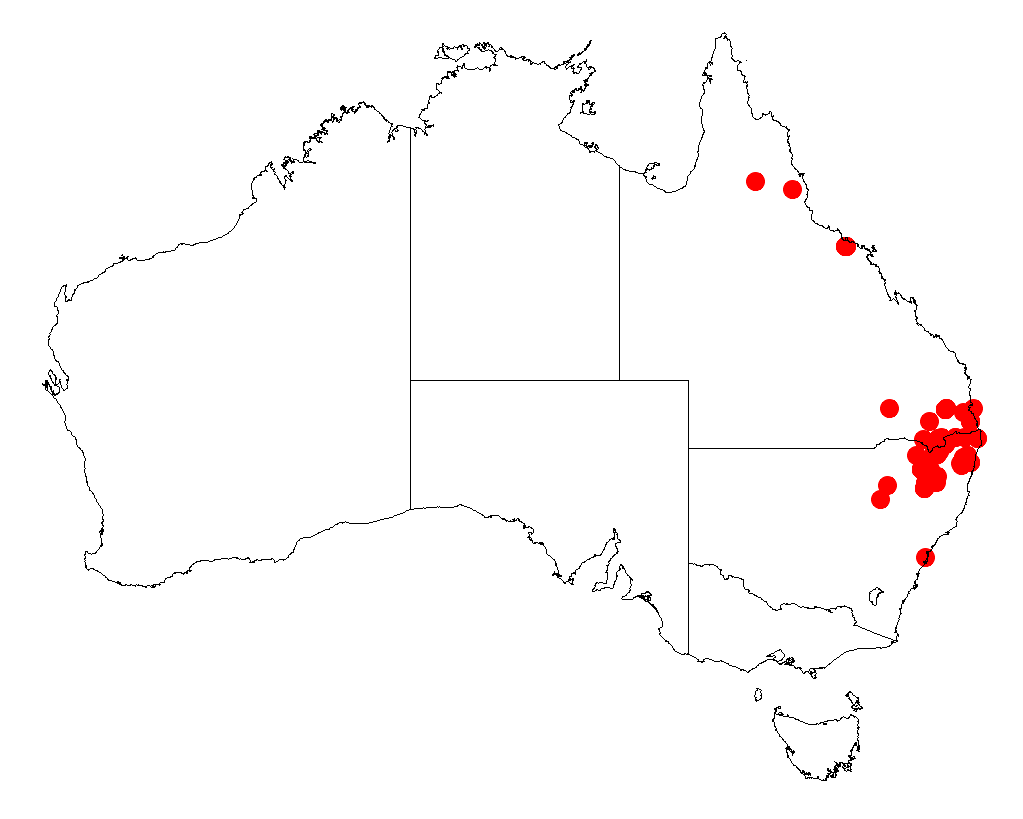
- Occurrence data from AVH

Synonyms
- Acacia doratoxylon var. ovata Maiden & Betche; Racosperma graniticum (Maiden) Pedley

= Acacia granitica =

Granite wattle

Species of legume

Acacia granitica commonly known as granite wattle, is a species of flowering plant in the family Fabaceae and is endemic to eastern Australia. It is a multistemmed, erect or often low-lying shrub with linear, leathery phyllodes, spikes of golden yellow flowers and straight pods, slightly constricted between, and raised over the seeds.

== Description ==
Acacia granitica is an erect to spreading, sometimes low-lying, multistemmed, flat-topped shrub that typically grows to a height of up to 3 m (9.8 ft) and has corrugated bark at its base. Its branches are glabrous, dark purplish brown and often resinous. The phyllodes are linear, straight to slightly curved, 100–250 mm (3.9–9.8 in) long, 1–3 mm (0.039–0.118 in) wide and leathery with up to three inconspicuous main veins. The flowers are golden yellow and borne in two oval or short-cylindrical spikes 3–10 mm (0.12–0.39 in) long in axils, on a peduncle 0.5–3.5 mm (0.020–0.138 in) long. Flowering occurs from late July to mid November, and the pods are straight to slightly curved (often curving and twisting after opening), 25–80 mm (0.98–3.15 in) long, 2–3 mm (0.079–0.118 in) wide and thinly leathery to firmly papery, slightly constricted between and raised over the seeds.

== Taxonomy and naming ==
This species was first formally described in 1920 by Joseph Maiden and Ernst Betche, who gave it the name Acacia doratoxylon var. ovata in the Journal and Proceedings of the Royal Society of New South Wales from a specimen collected near Stanthorpe. In 1921, Joseph Maiden raised the variety to species status, giving it the name Acacia granitica because the name Acacia ovata was already in use for a different species. Maiden did not give a reason for the epithet (granitica) but wrote "apparently always on granite".

== Distribution and habitat ==
This species mainly grows in north-eastern New South Wales near Bendemeer, Torrington and Guyra on granite outcrops in shallow sandy soil and also on sandstone in eucalypt forests, sometimes in heath or near creeks north of Grafton New South Wales to Crows Nest in Queensland. It tolerates poor drainage, frost and snow.

== See also ==
- List of Acacia species
