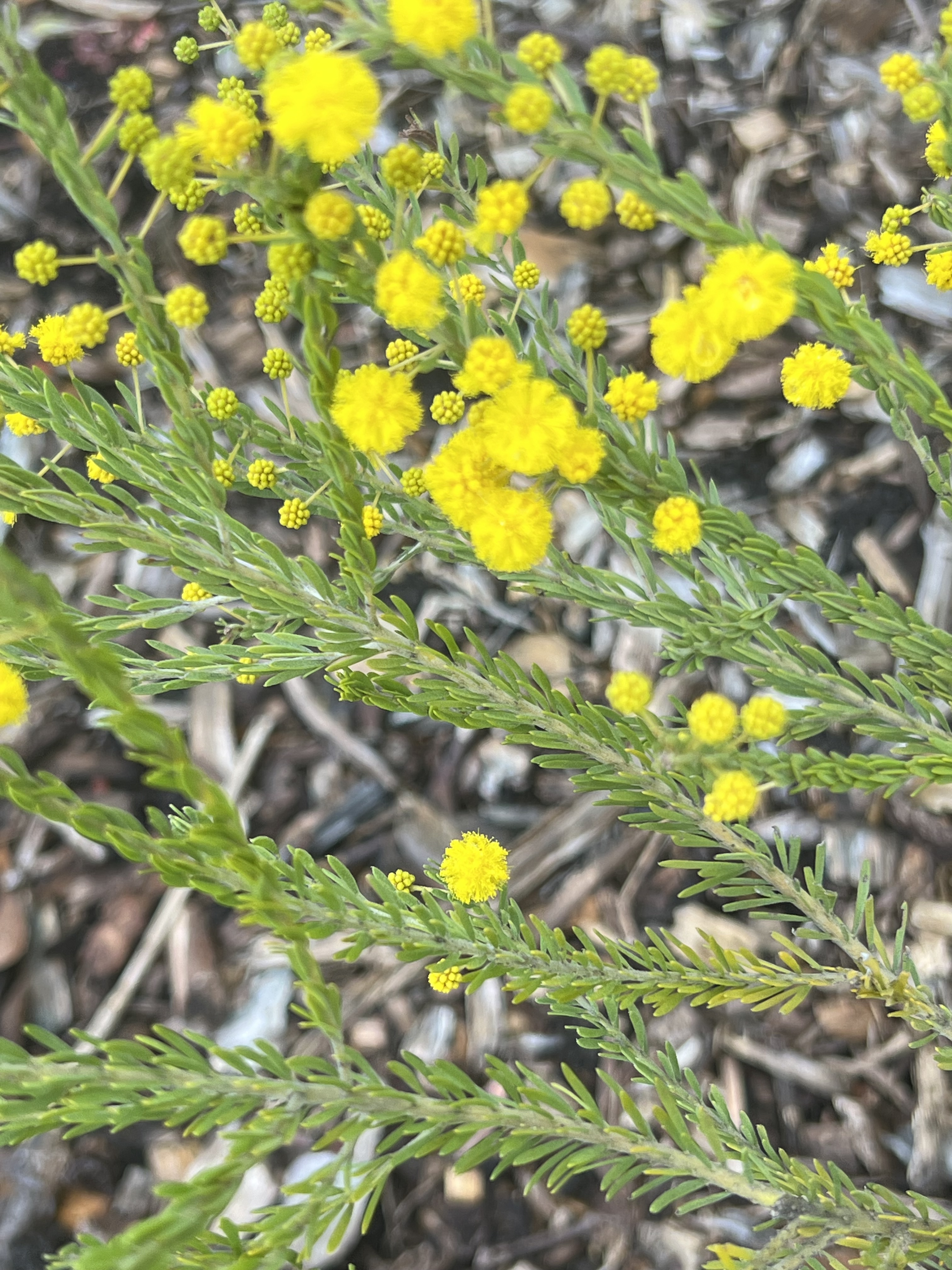

Scientific classification
- Kingdom: Plantae
- Clade: Tracheophytes
- Clade: Angiosperms
- Clade: Eudicots
- Clade: Rosids
- Order: Fabales
- Family: Fabaceae
- Subfamily: Caesalpinioideae
- Clade: Mimosoid clade
- Genus: Acacia
- Species: A. mariae

Binomial name
- Acacia mariae Pedley

Synonyms
- List: Acacia conferta auct. non A.Cunn. ex Benth.; Acacia tindaleae auct. non Pedley

= Acacia mariae =

Species of legume

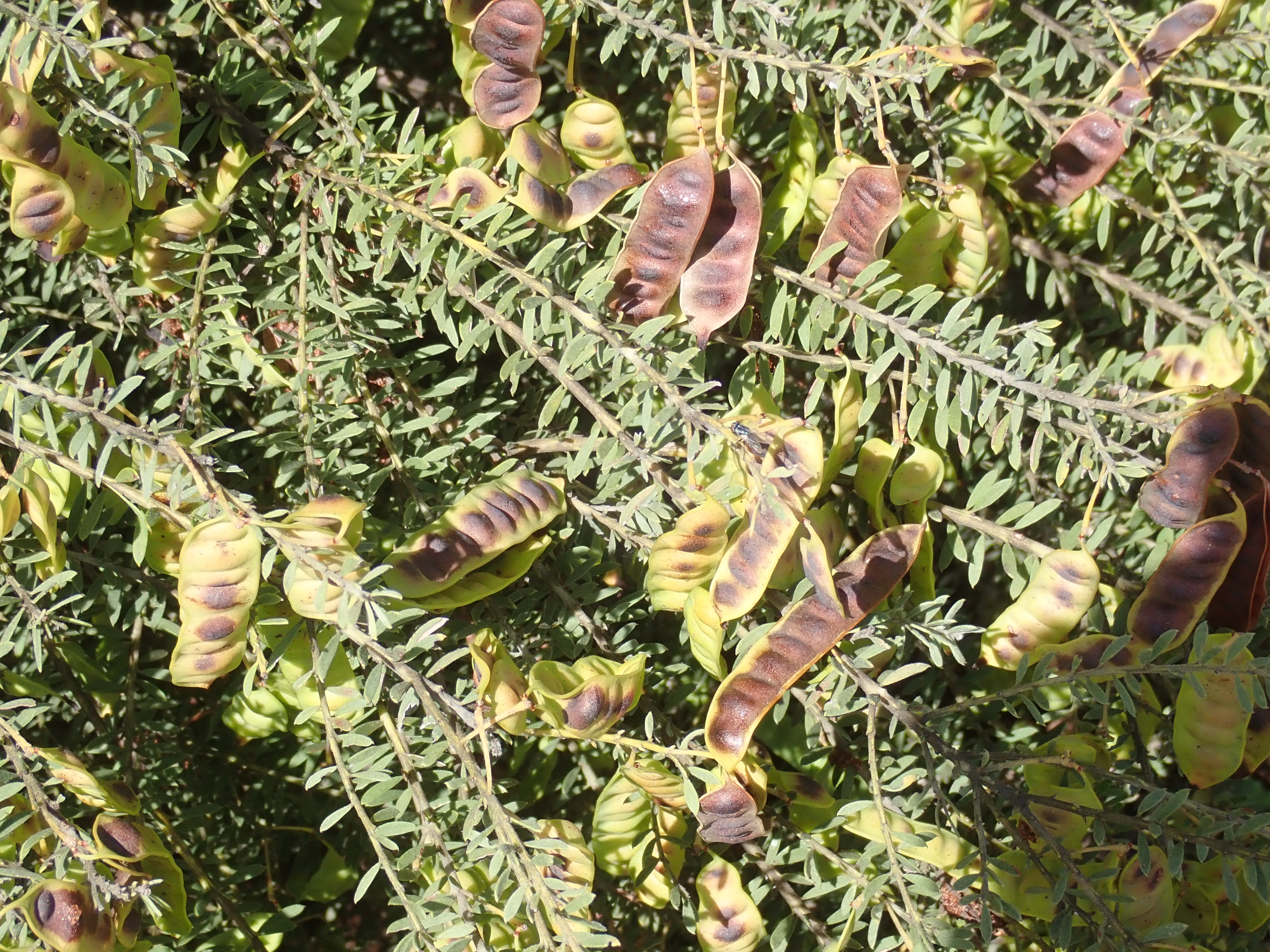
Pods

Acacia mariae, commonly known as golden-top wattle or crowned wattle, is a species of flowering plant in the family Fabaceae and is endemic to New South Wales, Australia. It is an erect to spreading or compact shrub with hairy branchlets, crowded, sometimes whorled, very narrowly elliptic to lance-shaped phyllodes, spherical heads of bright yellow flowers, and firmly papery to thinly leathery pods.

== Description ==
Acacia mariae is an erect to spreading, sometimes compact shrub, that typically grows to a height of 1–2 m (3 ft 3 in – 6 ft 7 in) and has branchlets densely covered with shaggy hairs pressed against the surface. Its phyllodes are crowded, sometimes more or less whorled or clustered, on short stem-projections, very narrowly elliptic to narrowly lance-shaped with the narrower end towards the base, 4–13 mm (0.16–0.51 in) long, 1–2 mm (0.039–0.079 in) wide, flat and straight or slightly curved. The phyllodes have silvery-grey hairs pressed against the surface, an obscure midvein and a small gland above the pulvinus. The flowers are borne in a spherical head in axils on a densely hairy peduncle 5–15 mm (0.20–0.59 in) long, each head 5–7 mm (0.20–0.28 in) in diameter with 27 to 38 bright yellow flowers. Flowering occurs from July to October, and the pods are 40–60 mm (1.6–2.4 in) long, 8–10.5 mm (0.31–0.41 in) wide and firmly papery to thinly leathery with a thread-like stalk 1–2 mm (0.039–0.079 in) long.

== Taxonomy ==
Acacia mariae was first formally described in 2006 by Leslie Pedley in the journal Austrobaileya from specimens collected near Pilliga in 1977. The specific epithet honours Mary Tindale who was once a botanist with the National Herbarium of New South Wales. Leslie Pedley opines that "it is regrettable that the name Acacia tindaleae has been relegated to the synonymy of Acacia conferta".

== Distribution and habitat ==
Golden-top wattle grows in sand in forest, woodland and mallee on the western slopes and plains on New South Wales between Cuttabri and Dubbo and west to Mount Hope. It is common in the Pilliga forest.

== See also ==
- List of Acacia species
