= Moonbi =

Moonbi New South Wales
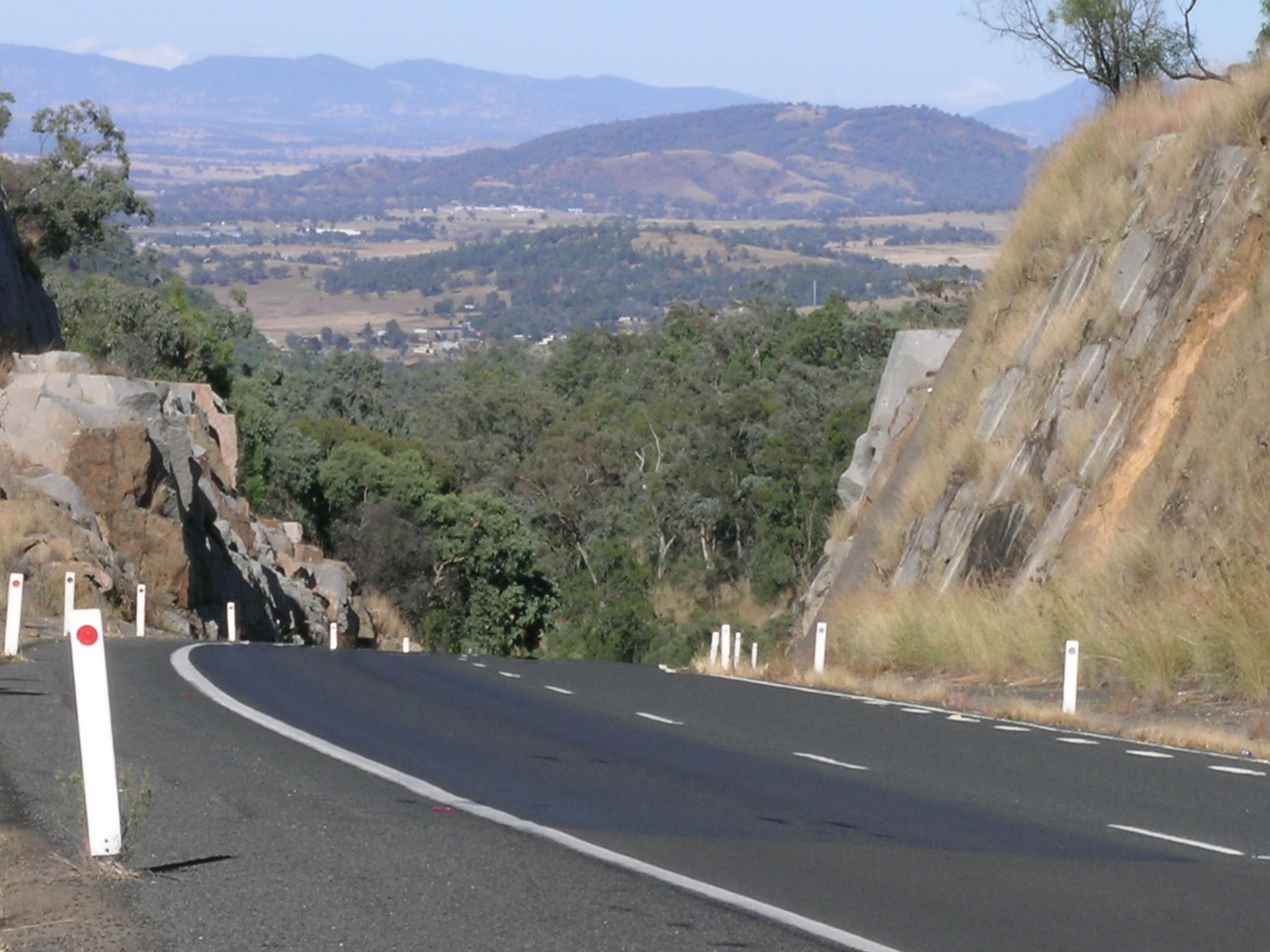
- Moonbi valley from the Moonbi Range

- Coordinates: 31°1′S 151°4′E
- Population: 357 (2006 census)
- Postcode(s): 2353
- Elevation: 464 m (1,522 ft)
- Location: 474 km (295 mi) from Sydney; 20 km (12 mi) from Tamworth
- LGA(s): Tamworth Regional Council
- County: Inglis
- State electorate(s): Tamworth
- Federal division(s): New England

Moonbi is a village situated on the New England Highway 20 kilometres north of Tamworth, New South Wales, Australia. It is nestled at the foot of the Moonbi Range and is part of the Tamworth Regional Council local government area. Moonbi is located a few kilometres to the north of the town of Kootingal. At the 2006 census, Moonbi had a population of 357 people.

The village is renowned as a centre for the poultry industry with many large poultry farms and associated industries located around the area. Moonbi has erected a large fibreglass chicken in recognition of the poultry industry centred here. The surrounding area has many small 'lifestyle' blocks that are often used to run horses.

== History ==
The Moonbi area is the traditional land of the Kamilaroi (or Gamilaraay) and Anaiwon Aboriginal people.

William Dangar and Edward Cory crossed the ranges in 1830. "Cory's Pillar", also known as Cory's Nightcap, is a prominent balancing stone landmark seen on the right of the New England Highway when travelling northwards on the first Moonbi Hill.

A village was settled there in the 1850s when bullock teams and travellers began passing through the region in search of new land for their livestock. During this period there were two inns and one hotel there. In 1859 a post office opened at Moonby Station and in 1882 the Moonbi Public School opened.

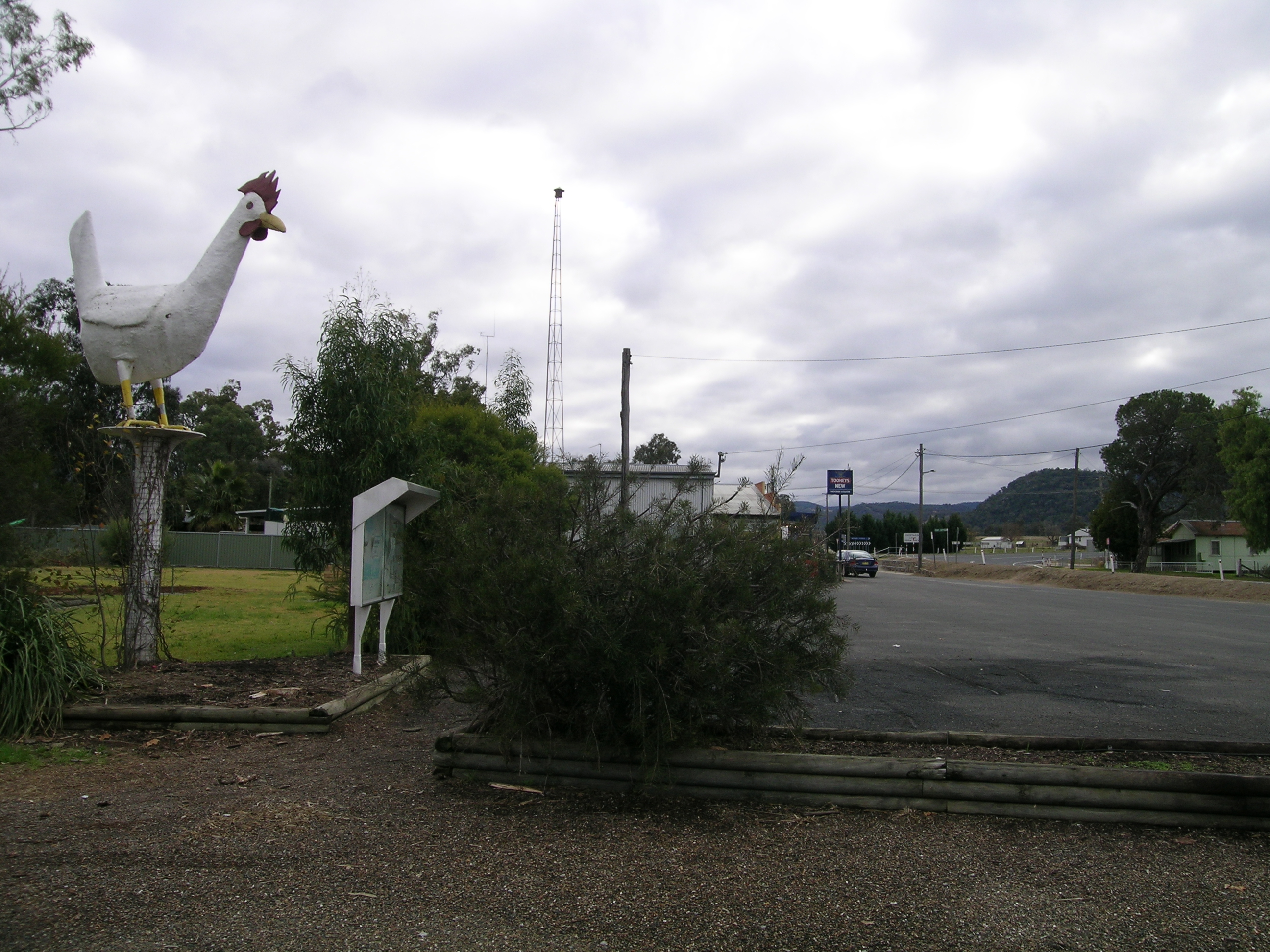
New England Highway, Moonbi with the range in the background

In August 2007 Moonbi became the centre of attention in the wake of the quarantined horses and lockdown at Moonbi Recreation Ground as a result of the equine influenza outbreak. This followed the running of dressage competitions here during the outbreak of EI. The situation was made difficult as no accommodation was available here for the horse owners.

The village has a post office, public school, recreation ground, pony club grounds, general store, nursing home, produce retailer, roadhouse, service station and a rubber belting supplies and engineering company.

Travelling north along the New England Highway, on the first Moonbi Hill, is the Moonbi Lookout perched on a huge granite outcrop with some beautiful views of Moonbi and the Cockburn Valley.

== Transport ==
Tamworth Buslines operates a bus service between Moonbi, Bendemeer and Tamworth.
