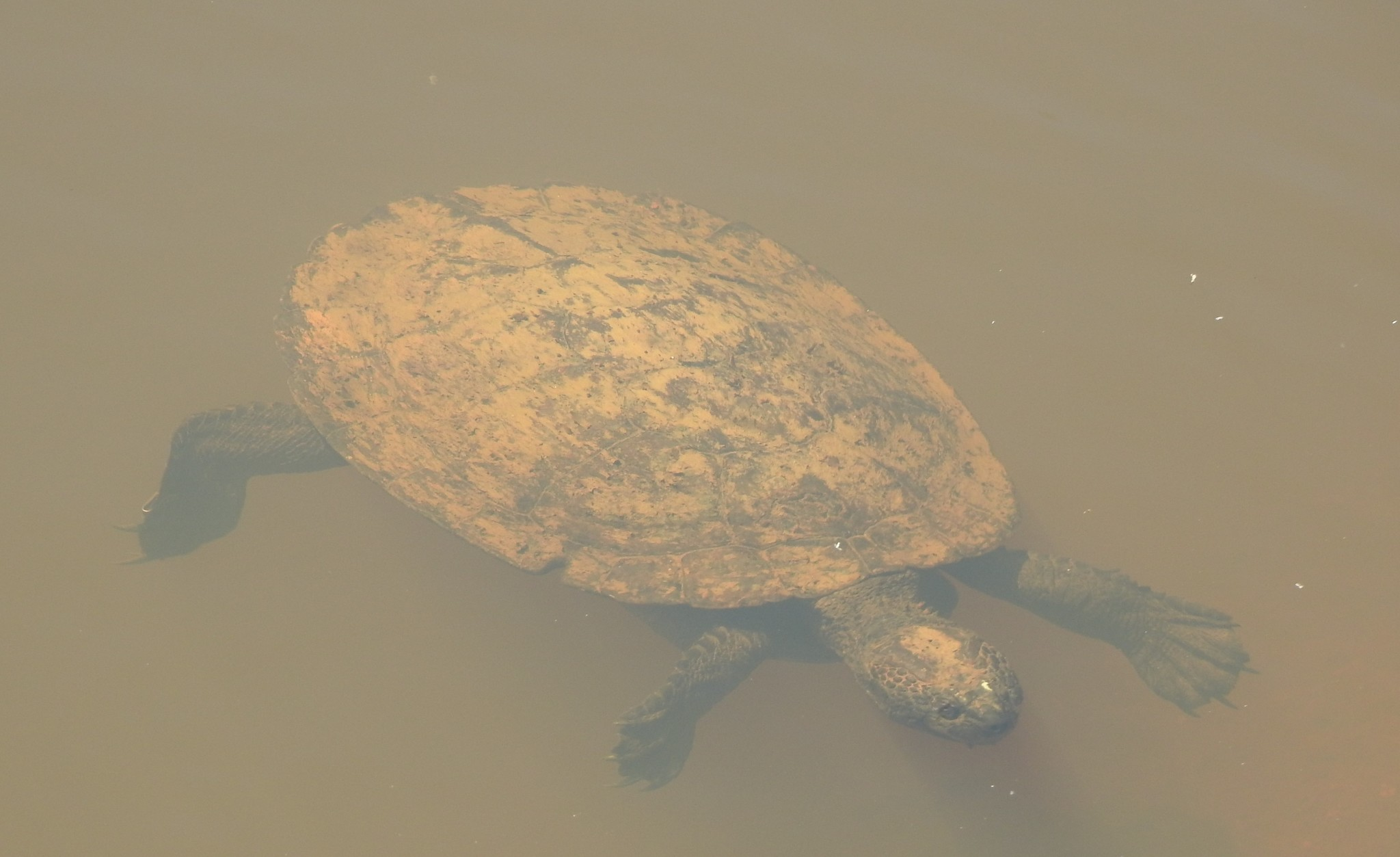

Conservation status
- Endangered (IUCN 2.3)

Scientific classification
- Kingdom: Animalia
- Phylum: Chordata
- Class: Reptilia
- Order: Testudines
- Suborder: Pleurodira
- Family: Chelidae
- Genus: Myuchelys
- Species: M. bellii

Binomial name
- Myuchelys bellii (Gray, 1844)

Synonyms
- Phrynops bellii Gray, 1844; Hydraspis bellii — Gray, 1855; Elseya bellii — Cann, 1998; Wollumbinia bellii — Wells, 2007; Myuchelys bellii — Thomson & Georges, 2009

= Namoi River snapping turtle =

Species of turtle

The Namoi River snapping turtle (Myuchelys bellii), also commonly known as Bell's turtle, the Namoi River elseya, or Bell's saw-shelled turtle, is a species of turtle in the family Chelidae. The species is endemic to New South Wales, Australia.

== Description ==
Myuchelys bellii is the largest species in the Myuchelys genus with adult males (up to 227 mm carapace length) smaller than females (up to 300 mm carapace length). They are a uniform light to dark brown color with a broad oval shape. Juveniles display a serrated posterior edge of the carapace this may persist into so adults but begin to smooth. The plastron in adults is a pale yellow with dark dark patches or streaks. Have a prominent shield on dorsal surface of the head extending posterior toward but not touching the tympanum. Forelimbs each have five claws and the hind limbs have four claws. Gray tail which is shorter than half the carapace length. Hatchling have a (mean carapace length 26.7 ± 0.3 mm; mean carapace width 26.8 ± 0.6 mm, n = 16).

== Etymology ==
The specific name, bellii, and some of the common names, are in honor of English zoologist Thomas Bell.

== Geographic range ==
M. bellii occurs in the upper reaches of the Namoi, Gwydir, Macdonald, and Severn rivers in northern New South Wales, Australia. A disjunct population occurs in Bald Rock Creek, in southeast Queensland.
