= Cobrabald River =

River in New South Wales, Australia

Coordinates: 31.0975°S 151.4650°E

Cobrabald River Cobrabald Creek, St. Leonards Creek
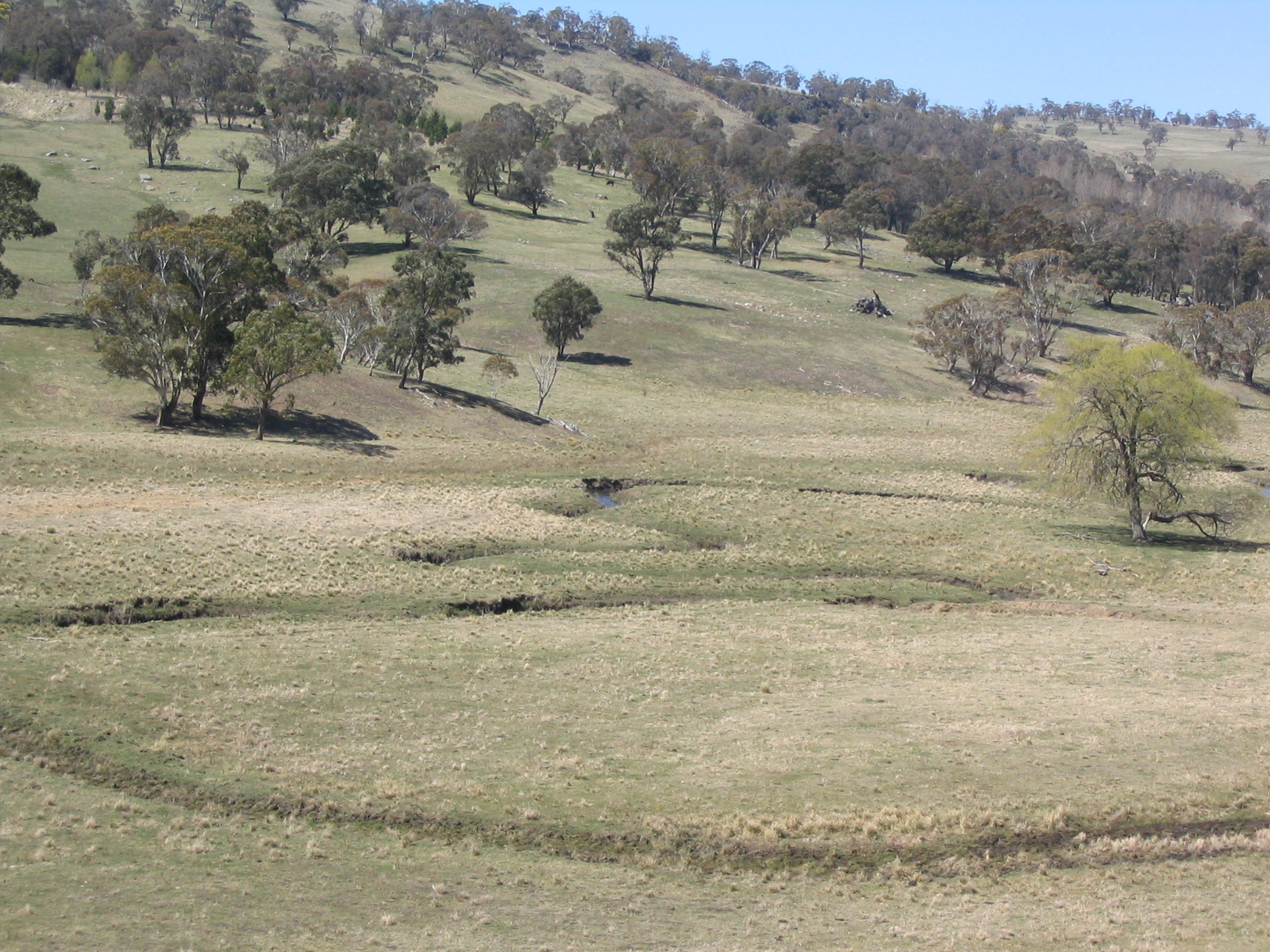

Location
- Country: Australia
- State: New South Wales
- Region: IBRA: New England Tablelands
- District: Northern Tablelands
- Municipality: Walcha

Physical characteristics
- Source: Great Dividing Range
  - location: south east of Branga Swamp
  - elevation: 1,370 m (4,490 ft)
- Mouth: confluence with the Macdonald River
  - location: west of Cobrabald Mountain
  - elevation: 990 m (3,250 ft)
- Length: 52.8 km (32.8 mi)

Cobrabald River, a mostly perennial river that is part of the Namoi catchment within the Murray–Darling basin, is located in the Northern Tablelands district of New South Wales, Australia.

The river rises in high country on the western slopes of the Great Dividing Range south east of Branga Swamp about 50 kilometres (31 mi) south of Walcha. The river flows generally north and north west for, towards its confluence with the Macdonald River; dropping 383 metres (1,257 ft) over its course of 52 kilometres (32 mi).

The entire length of the Cobrabald River is within the boundaries of Walcha Shire and Vernon County.

The country along the Cobrabald River is a rich grazing area used for rearing livestock.

The Walcha fishing club stocks this river annually and it is one of the best trout fishing rivers in NSW. A fossicking area is also available in a reserve just off the Niangala Road and along the Cobrabald River.

== See also ==
- Rivers of New South Wales
- List of rivers of Australia
