= Cuttabri, New South Wales =

Cuttabri New South Wales
- Coordinates: 30.3300°S 149.2212°E
- Population: 43 (2016 census)

Cuttabri is a town in north-western New South Wales, between Wee Waa and Pilliga on the Pilliga-Narrabri road. It is located 26 kilometres west of Wee Waa and 32 kilometres east of Pilliga.

It is home to the Cuttabri Wine Shanty, which, until a few years ago, was open to visitors. It was built and operated by William Trindall for some years. William and his wife Elizabeth were early settlers to the area, being there as early as 1881. The Bee Hive Hotel, as it was originally known, was opened to the public in 1883 and stood until it burnt down in 1903. It was rebuilt, known as the Cuttabri Wine Shanty until it closed in 2010.

The village once had a post office, wine shop and hotel, and now all it has is the old Cuttabri Wine Shanty. It is on the banks of the Namoi River.
