= Inglis County =

Inglis New South Wales
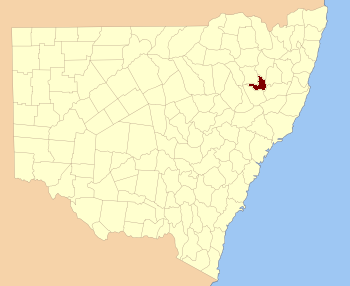
- Location in New South Wales
Lands administrative divisions around Inglis:
Darling	Hardinge	Sandon
Darling	Inglis	Vernon
Parry	Parry	Vernon

Inglis County is one of the 141 cadastral divisions of New South Wales. It contains Tamworth and Bendemeer.

Inglis County was named in honour of Major-General, Sir John Eardley Wilmot Inglis (1814–1862).

== Parishes within this county ==
A full list of parishes found within this county; their current LGA and mapping coordinates to the approximate centre of each location is as follows:

Parish	LGA	Coordinates
Attunga	Tamworth Regional Council	30°55′54″S 150°51′04″E
Bendemeer	Tamworth Regional Council	30°51′54″S 150°11′04″E
Bloomfield	Tamworth Regional Council	30°52′54″S 150°39′04″E
Bubbogullion	Tamworth Regional Council	30°52′54″S 150°46′04″E
Burdekin	Tamworth Regional Council	30°51′54″S 150°50′04″E
Burke	Tamworth Regional Council	30°58′54″S 151°17′04″E
Congi	Walcha Council	30°54′54″S 151°25′04″E
Danglemah	Tamworth Regional Council	30°59′54″S 151°10′04″E
Gill	Tamworth Regional Council	30°52′54″S 150°56′04″E
Haning	Tamworth Regional Council	30°46′54″S 151°05′04″E
Looanga	Tamworth Regional Council	30°44′54″S 151°20′04″E
Moonbi	Tamworth Regional Council	31°01′54″S 151°02′04″E
Muluerindie	Tamworth Regional Council	30°54′54″S 151°15′04″E
Perry	Tamworth Regional Council	30°56′54″S 151°05′04″E
Pringle	Tamworth Regional Council	30°38′54″S 151°05′04″E
Retreat	Tamworth Regional Council	30°37′54″S 151°08′04″E
Scott	Walcha Council	31°00′54″S 151°23′04″E
South Burke	Tamworth Regional Council	31°01′54″S 151°15′04″E
South Burke	Tamworth Regional Council	31°02′54″S 151°16′04″E
Tamworth	Tamworth Regional Council	31°04′54″S 150°59′04″E
Tara	Tamworth Regional Council	30°50′54″S 151°19′04″E
Winton	Tamworth Regional Council	30°43′54″S 151°10′04″E
Woolomol	Tamworth Regional Council	31°01′54″S 150°55′04″E
