= Niangala =

- Suburb
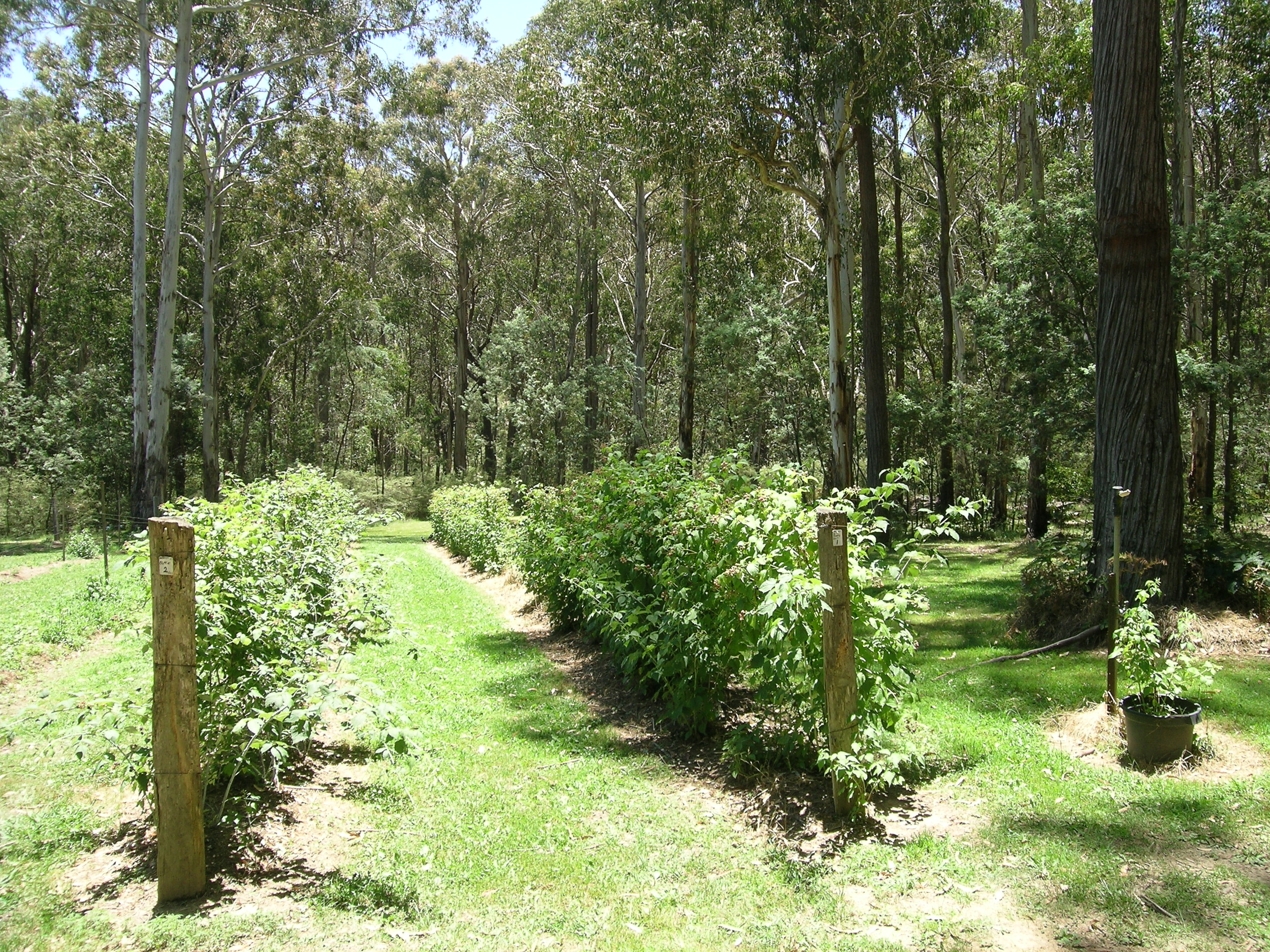
- Koolkuna Berry Farm

- Coordinates: 31°17′54″S 151°24′34″E
- Country: Australia
- State: New South Wales
- Region: New England; Hunter
- LGAs: Tamworth Regional Council; Walcha Shire; Upper Hunter Shire
- Location: 429 km (267 mi) N of Sydney; 61 km (38 mi) ESE of Tamworth; 53 km (33 mi) SSW of Walcha; 173 km (107 mi) NNE of Scone

Government
  - State electorate: Tamworth
  - Federal divisions: New England; Hunter
- Elevation: 1,300 m (4,300 ft)

Population
  - Total: 142 (2011 census)
- Time zone: UTC+10 (AEST)
  - Summer (DST): UTC+11 (AEDT)
- Postcode: 2354
- County: Parry
- Parish: Walcha

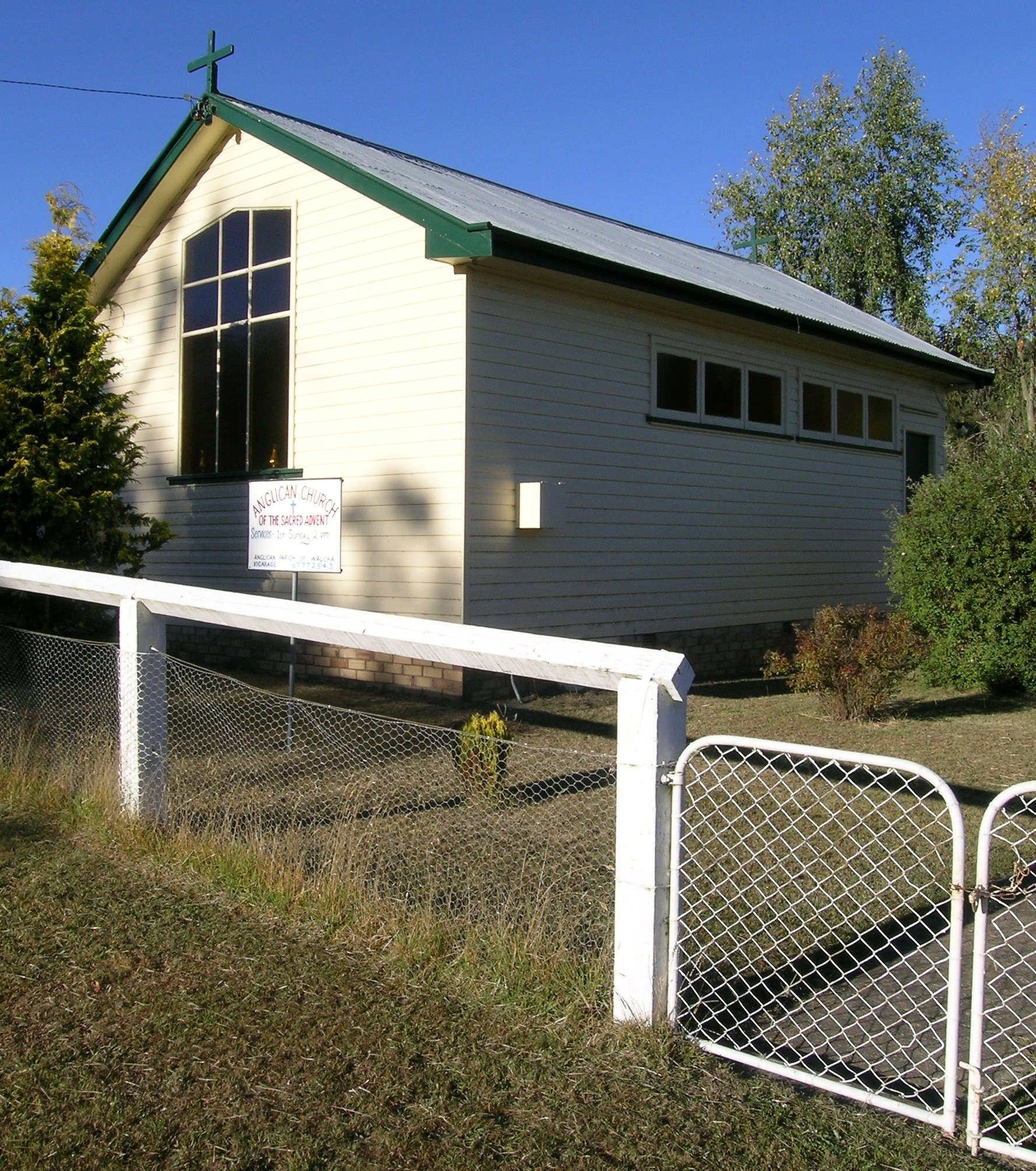
Anglican Church, Niangala

Niangala is a village located on the south-eastern edge of the Northern Tablelands area of New South Wales, Australia. It is on the Moonbi Range which is part of the Great Dividing Range, at approximately 1,300 metres (4,265 ft) above sea level. The village is in Walcha parish in Parry County. At the 2011 census, Niangala and the surrounding area had a population of 142.

Geographically isolated, the village is situated among pine tree plantations. Access to the community requires travel along some stretches of dirt road, which can be hazardous in wet or snow conditions. Winters are cold there, often with several falls of snow during the season.

Niangala, meaning ‘eclipse’, was first known as Bungadore, ‘blackrocks’ and is situated at the head of Bungendore Creek.

== History ==
In 1836 William Telfer marked a tree line from Port Stephens through Barrington, Nowendoc and on to Ogunbil. The Australian Agricultural Company set up stations and resting places for their travelling sheep along this route to be known as the ‘Peel Line’. This route was steep and rugged but it was much more efficient than the previously used route, via Maitland. The present roads, Thunderbolts Way from Gloucester and the Topdale Road to Tamworth, travel approximately the same route.

Niangala began as a gold mining settlement and by the end of October 1890, Niangala had five boarding houses, two butcheries, one blacksmith, a bakery and two stores. The Niangala post office opened on 1 December 1890 (it closed in 1977). and coach services travelled regularly from Walcha to Niangala. The Public School was opened in 1891 for 28 children of the local gold miners and had one teacher. The school remained a one teacher school until 1980. This school reached its peak enrolment of 51 students in 1991. In 1891 the population was 300 and on 14 September 1893 Niangala was proclaimed a village. During 1901 residents were able to connect to the telephone, but it was not until 1966 that 33 customers accessed rural power.

Not many land selections were made in the area before 1900, as the Niangala Gold Field had been removed from the Conditional Purchase Act, but was available for annual lease. The only other metal to be seriously mined was manganese which was taken during the 1930s to 1950s. Sheep and cattle breeding is the main industry, though there are now other diversified industries, particularly berry growing and extensive pine plantations that supply the local timber mill. Trout fishing is a popular tourist attraction in the Niangala area and a visit to the area will reveal some interesting scenery.

On 13 October 2002 an F2 tornado struck the Niangala region causing serious building, tree and livestock damage.

On 28 and 29 November 2008 Niangala received torrential rain that caused severe flooding and led to the area being declared a natural disaster area.

== Today ==
Niangala village is a remnant of the Australian gold rush days, leaving an old cemetery, a derelict gold crusher and a number of old buildings. There is a Church of England church that was built in 1964, a community hall and tennis courts. Today the village of Niangala has a population of about 30.

Casey Stoner the 2007 MotoGP World Champion and also 2008 Young Australian of the Year was raised in the Niangala area.
