= Moonbi Range =

Mountain range in Australia

Moonbi
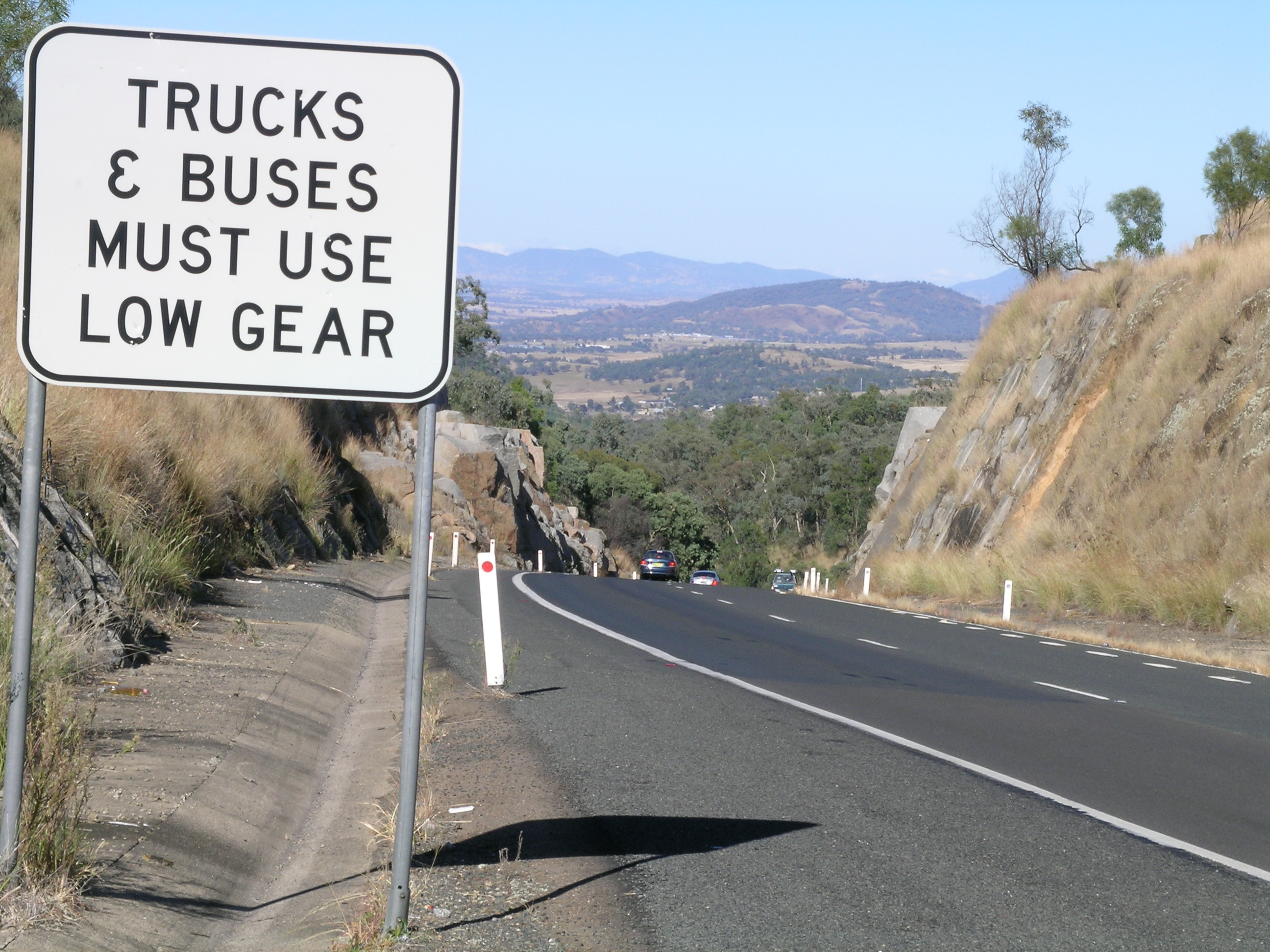
- New England Highway on the 1st Moonbi Hill

Highest point
- Peak: Mount Black Jack
- Elevation: 1,300 m (4,300 ft); AHD
- Coordinates: 30°57′50″S 151°07′42″E

Dimensions
- Length: 150 km (93 mi) NNW

Geography
- Location within New South Wales
- Country: Australia
- State: New South Wales
- Region(s): Northern Tablelands, New South Wales
- Range coordinates: 31°12′S 151°25′E
- Parent range: New England Range

The Moonbi Range, a mountain range that is part of the Great Dividing Range, is located in the Northern Tablelands of New South Wales, Australia.

The range is located roughly 20 kilometres (12 mi) north east of the city of Tamworth situated at the bottom of the Wentworth Mounds, which is part of the Moonbi Range. These mounds form a spur of the Great Dividing Range where the North West Slopes meet to the Northern Tablelands. The Moonbi Range rises from 500–1,300 metres (1,600–4,300 ft) above sea level and it generally forms the divide between the watersheds of the Cockburn River to the south, and the Macdonald River to the north, which are both themselves tributaries of the Namoi River.

The higher parts of the area often receive a snowfall in the winter, and the highest peak in the range is called Black Jack Mountain at 1,300 metres (4,300 ft).

== History ==
=== Aboriginal history ===
The original inhabitants of the ranges were Aborigines of the Kamilaroi clan.

=== European history ===
To the road traveller on the New England Highway, the Moonbi Range is notable as it is a major uphill climb on the highway as the motorist ascends from Moonbi at the foot of the 1st Moonbi Hill to the Northern Tablelands and the village of Bendemeer.

In 1832 Edward Gostwyck Cory blazed a track over the range that the existing highway has generally followed. A granite boulder named Cory's Pillar (sometimes Cory's Pillow or Cory's Nightcap) commemorates where Cory is believed to have rested during his travels.

In his poem Over the Range, Andrew "Banjo" Paterson wrote of the obstacle that the Moonbi Range created for travellers to the Northern Tablelands. When Banjo Paterson was born in 1864, the Great North Road was still in poor condition making travel to the New England district for wagon teams very difficult. The mountain range was also immortalised in the annals of Australian country and western music by Buddy Williams. His song, The Mighty Moonbi Range, fitted into the truckdriving genre and included spellbinding verses such as, "Big Jim was a timber man with muscles made of steel. An iron nerve to hold the curve, two big hands on the wheel. But twenty tonnes of ironbark, the devils fatal load, went crashing off the Moonbi... the end of Big Jim's road."

'The Pinch' was a pass over the First Moonbi Hill near Cory's Pillar which involved a steep climb of about 200 metres (660 ft). Here teamsters used to hitch several teams together to haul their wagons up this section. Descending the range loaded, they often dragged felled trees behind them to slow their descent down these steep slopes.

Capt. B. H. Martindale, the Commissioner for Internal Communication, in his fourth report in 1860 was able to refer to "2 miles of road at the Moonbi’s Pass which has been greatly improved." By 1865, the road section between Tamworth and Bendemeer had been cleared and fenced.

A second route was found through the Moonbi Ranges in the early 1870s which eliminated the steep section of "The (Blue) Pinch."

In 1937 a new bitumen sealed route to eliminate the earlier "S-Bend" deviation and a steep section was built from Moonbi over the range. Reconstruction on the First Moonbi Hill which began in 1975 now continues on a 5 kilometres (3.1 mi) section, which has double traffic lanes in each direction. Emergency stopping beds have been built running off the highway on both of the hills in case of vehicle brake failure.

The Moonbi Park lookout situated in a high area just off the New England Highway roughly 25 kilometres (16 mi) north of Tamworth, offers views of the area south of the mountain from a huge granite boulder.

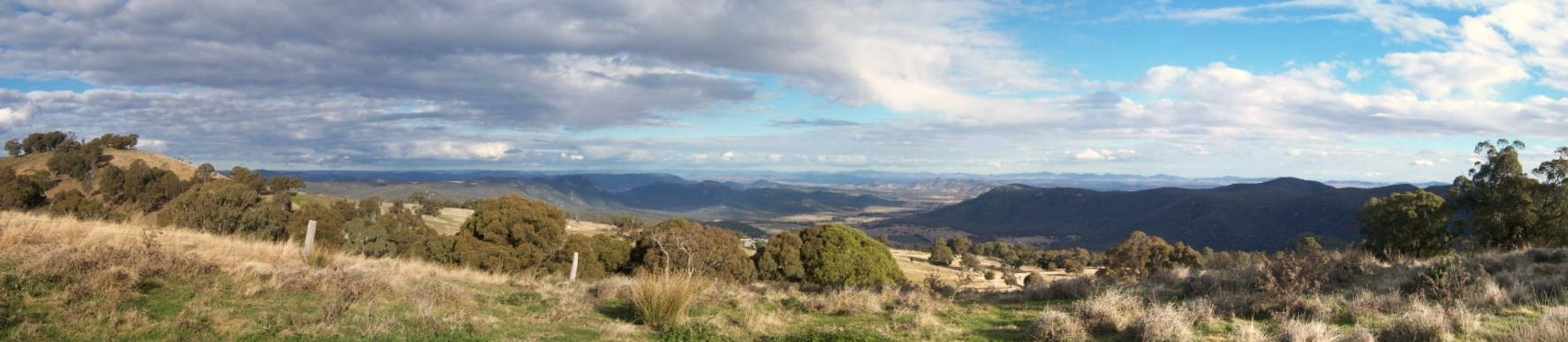
Panoramic view looking south from a higher part of the range

== See also ==
- List of mountains in New South Wales
