= Bendemeer, New South Wales =

Bendemeer
- Town
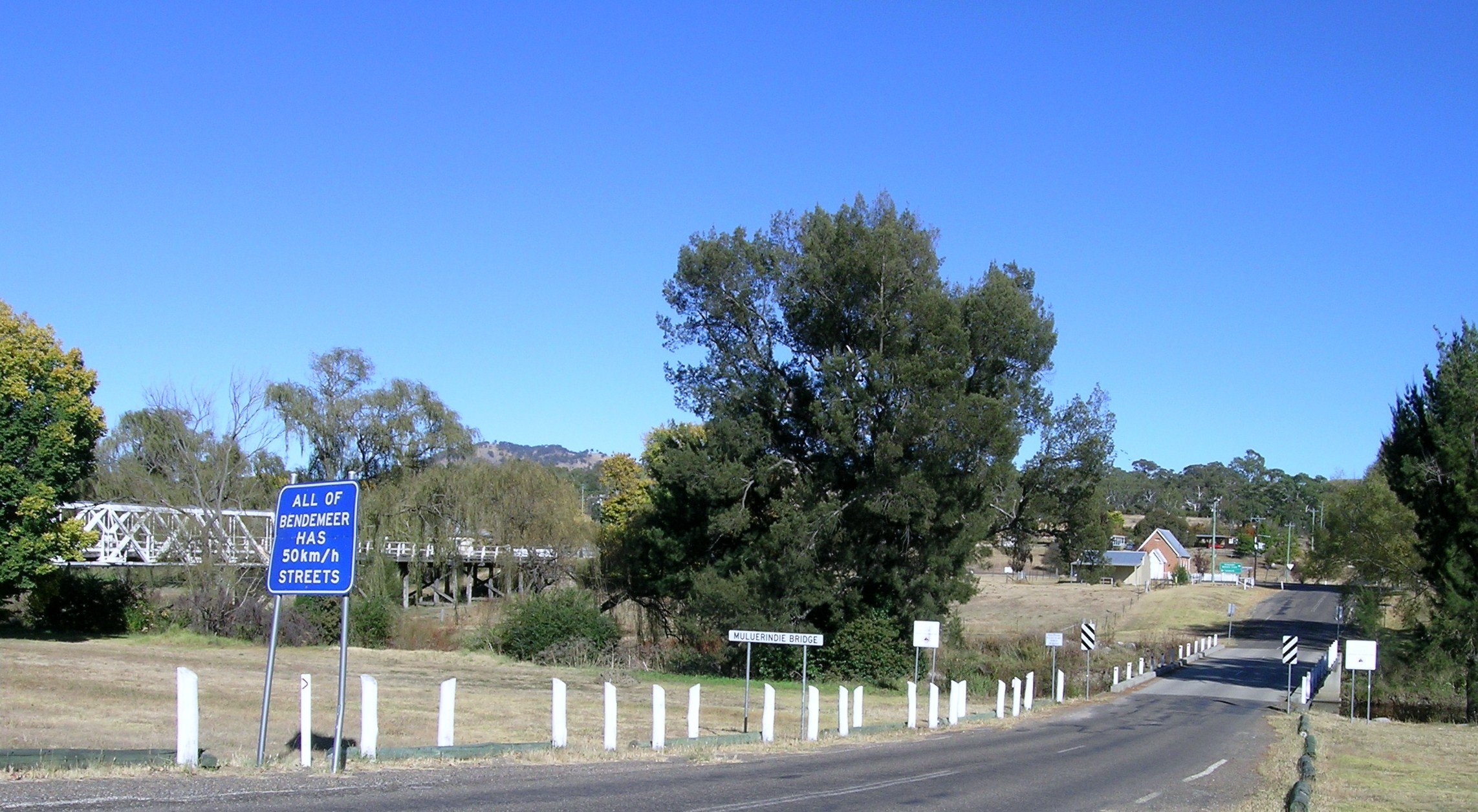
- The two bridges across the Macdonald River at Bendemeer

- Coordinates: 30°53′S 151°09′E
- Country: Australia
- State: New South Wales
- LGA: Tamworth Regional Council
- Location: 40 km (25 mi) north of Tamworth; 452 km (281 mi) north of Sydney

Government
  - State electorates: Tamworth; Northern Tablelands
  - Federal division: New England
- Elevation: 815 m (2,674 ft)

Population
  - Total: 485 (2006 census)
- Postcode: 2355
- County: Inglis

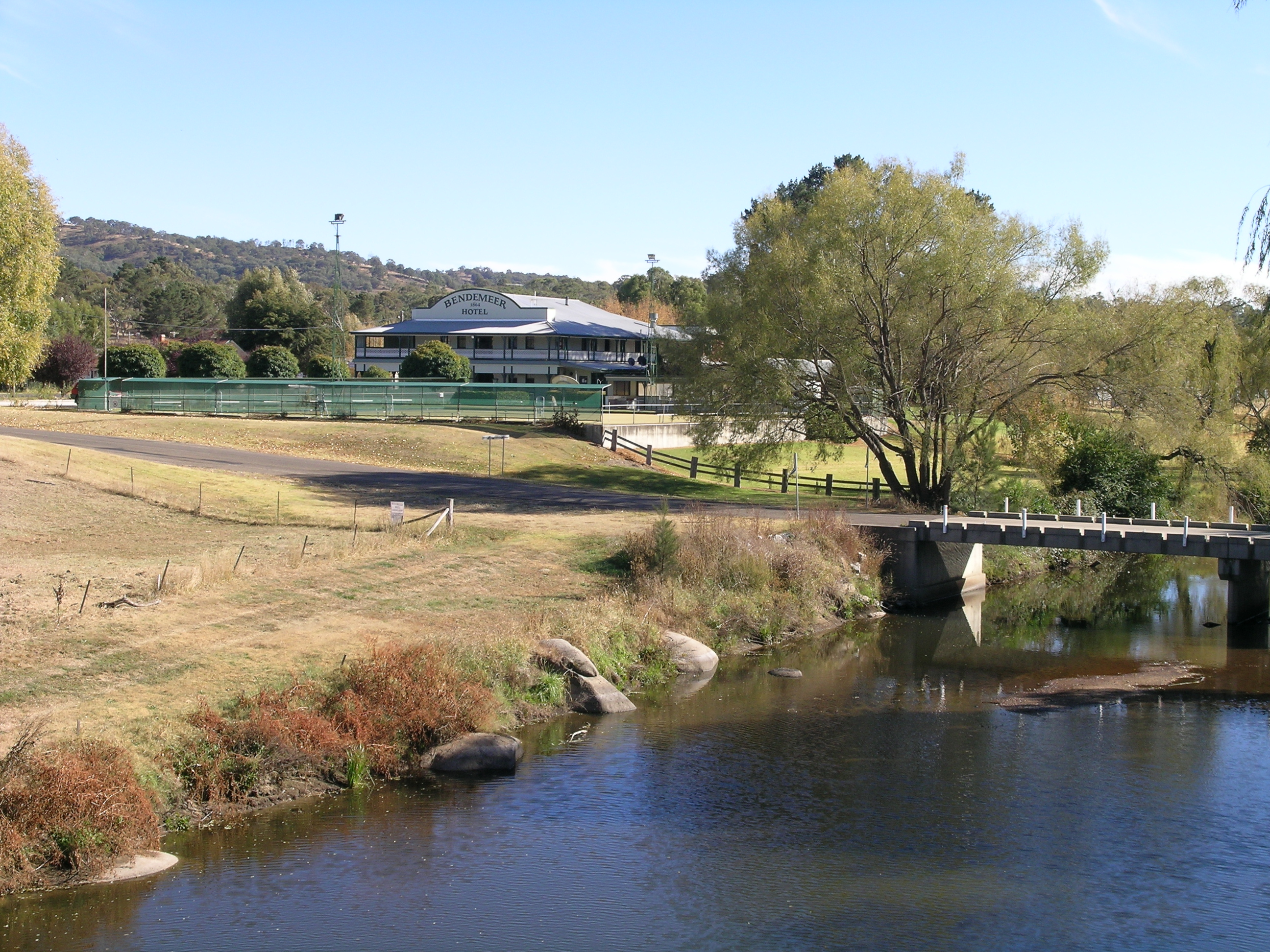
Macdonald River, new bridge and hotel

Bendemeer (30°53′S 151°09′E) is a village of 485 people on the Macdonald River in the New England region of New South Wales, Australia. It is situated at the junction of the New England and Oxley Highways.

== History ==
The original inhabitants of the land were Indigenous Australians of the Kamilaroi clan. The first European settlement was in 1834, with the establishment of a sheep station at a river crossing on what would become the McDonald River. By 1851 a small village had grown around the station, which was known as McDonald River.

In 1854 the village was renamed Bendemeer after a line in the 1817 poem Lalla-Rookh by Thomas Moore:

There's a bower of roses by Bendemeer's stream; And the nightingale sings round it all day long."

Moore was referring to a stream that ran through the ruined city of Persepolis in modern-day Iran. The word "bendemeer" is a loose translation of the Persian bund (embankment) and amir (a local ruler). It was proposed as the village name by Thomas Perry, a local farmer whose grandfather had maintained a friendship with both Moore and the first New South Wales Surveyor General, Thomas Mitchell.

In 1864 the bushranger Captain Thunderbolt carried out one of his first armed robberies by holding up the northern mail as it passed through Bendemeer.

The first bridge over the McDonald River was constructed in 1874, and the steel and timber truss bridge was opened on 29 September 1905. A historic engineering marker was erected near this bridge in 2005. The bridge now in use through the village is a low level concrete structure.

The Macdonald River Road Bridge and Bendemeer Public Cemetery, Bendemeer Watsons Creek Rd, have been placed on the Register of the National Estate.

== Transport ==
Tamworth Buslines operates a bus service between Bendemeer and Tamworth.

== Demographics ==
The population of Bendemeer is overwhelmingly Christian (83%) and Australian-born (90%). The average age of 41 years is slightly older than the Australian average of 37. A third of Bendemeer residents are over the age of 55, compared to a national average of 24%.

== Industries and services ==
Bendemeer is principally a business hub for local sheep and cattle graziers. The town also hosts a range of arts festivals and craft markets, as well as a triennial Tractor Muster. Town services include a general shop, a hotel and restaurant, caravan park and camping ground, and Catholic and Presbyterian churches.

The Bendemeer Public School caters for 33 students and is a recipient of annual funding via the Disadvantaged Schools Program administered by the Department of Education.

On 10 September 2012, Bendemeer became one of the first Australian villages where National Broadband Network 12 Mbit/s dedicated wireless broadband services can be purchased.
