= Sport in Sydney =

Sport is a significant aspect of the Sydney lifestyle. Activities range from the occasional international event, annual competitions, competitive leagues and individual recreational pursuits. Sydney is the home of Australia's biggest sports league, the National Rugby League, hosting 16 teams, and the base for a number of teams in national competitions including two Australian Football League and eight National Rugby League teams. Sydney hosted the 2000 Summer Olympics and Paralympics.

The Sydney City Council caters for sporting activities with a range of facilities. Across the city there are multiple stadiums, many kilometres of dedicated bikeways, ovals and other sports venues. Stadium Australia and the Sydney Cricket Ground, are two of the largest venues in the city.

== Sports by Popularity ==
=== Rugby League ===
Established in 1908, Rugby League is the most popular winter spectator sport in Sydney. The National Rugby League has eight teams based in the city as well as playing the NRL Grand Final in Sydney. The city was where the league was founded in 1908 as the New South Wales Rugby League, and the New South Wales rugby league team (the Blues), which plays in the world's largest attended sporting competition, State of Origin, is based in Sydney. The average attendance ranges from 18,000 to 12,000 across the clubs in Sydney, whilst State of Origin and the Grand Final regularly attract 80,000 people.

=== Rugby Union ===
Rugby Union was the dominant winter sport prior to the arrival of rugby league. Rugby union commenced in 1870 in Sydney as a club competition with the Wallaroo FC, Sydney University FC, colleges and others. This became the Shute Shield and was the highest tier of local rugby until the 1990s when the professional Super Rugby competition began. The New South Wales Waratahs are the state's Super Rugby franchise, and played their first match in 1882 against Queensland at the Sydney Cricket Ground.

=== Horse Racing ===
Organised horse racing in Sydney dates to October 1810, when the city's first official race meeting was held at Hyde Park with the approval of Governor Lachlan Macquarie. The Australian Turf Club, foirmed in 2011 through the merger of the Australian Jockey Club and Sydney Turf Club, conducts racing at four Sydney venues: Royal Randwick, Rosehill Gardens, Canterbury Park and Warwick Farm racecourses.

Sydney has two internationally-recognised racing carnivals in the spring and the autumn. The Sydney Autumn Racing Carnival includes the Golden Slipper at Rosehill Gardens, and The Championships, a two-day series hosted over two Saturdays at Royal Randwick inaugurated in 2014. The autumn carnival offers more than A$46 million in prizemoney in 2026. The Sydney Spring Racing Carnival has expanded with the introduction of the $20 million The Everest in 2017 and the $10 million The Golden Eagle in 2019. Organised by the Australian Turf Club and Racing NSW, the Sydney Everest Carnival offered more than A$80 million in prizemoney acorss nine meetings at Royal Randwick and Rosehill Gardens in 2026.

== Stats and Teams ==
Rugby league is the most popular spectator sport in Sydney. In 2006, 565,898 people attended first class rugby league matches at Stadium Australia alone. Other popular spectator sports include cricket, soccer, Australian rules football, rugby union and basketball. The martial arts are also popular in Sydney, with the more traditional western combative disciplines and also because of the proximity to Asian countries where the arts are historically based. While participation rates are high it tends not to enjoy the profile of traditional Australia sports, though the olympic sports of boxing, judo and taekwondo are more well known. For the Asian arts there are many places to practice in Sydney.

=== Teams in national competitions ===
Club	League	Venue	Established	Premierships
Canterbury-Bankstown Bulldogs	National Rugby League	Stadium Australia	1935	8
Cronulla-Sutherland Sharks	National Rugby League	Endeavour Field	1967	1
Greater Western Sydney Giants	Australian Football League	Sydney Showground Stadium	2012	Nil
Greater Western Sydney Giants Netball	Super Netball	State Sports Centre, Sydney SuperDome	2012	Nil
Macarthur FC	A-League Men	Campbelltown Stadium	2020	Nil
Manly-Warringah Sea Eagles	National Rugby League	Brookvale Oval	1947	8
New South Wales cricket team	Sheffield Shield/One Day Cup	Sydney Cricket Ground	1856	46 (Sheffield Shield), 9 (One Day Cup), 1 (T20 Bash)
New South Wales Swifts	Super Netball	Sydney Olympic Park Sports Centre, Sydney SuperDome	2008	1
New South Wales Waratahs	Super Rugby	Stadium Australia, Sydney Cricket Ground, Western Sydney Stadium	1882	1
New South Wales Pride	Hockey One	Sydney Olympic Park Hockey Centre	2019	1 (Mens), 0 (Womens)
Parramatta Eels	National Rugby League	Western Sydney Stadium	1947	4
Penrith Panthers	National Rugby League	Penrith Stadium	1967	4
St George Illawarra Dragons	National Rugby League	Jubilee Oval, Wollongong Showground	1999	1
South Sydney Rabbitohs	National Rugby League	Stadium Australia	1908	21
Sydney Bears	Australian Ice Hockey League	Sydney Ice Arena	1982	2
Sydney Blue Sox	Australian Baseball League	Blacktown International Sportspark	2009	Nil
Sydney FC	A-League Men	Sydney Football Stadium	2005	2 (P'ships), 3 (C'ships), 2 (WL P'ships), 2 (WL C'ships)
Sydney Ice Dogs	Australian Ice Hockey League	Liverpool Catholic Club Ice Rink	2002	2
Sydney Kings	National Basketball League	Sydney Olympic Park Sports Centre	1988	3
Sydney Roosters	National Rugby League	Sydney Football Stadium	1908	13
Sydney Sixers	Big Bash League	Sydney Cricket Ground	2011	3
Sydney Swans	Australian Football League	Sydney Cricket Ground, Stadium Australia	1874	5
Sydney Thunder	Big Bash League	Sydney Showground Stadium	2011	1 (BBL), 1 (WBBL)
Sydney Uni Flames	Women's National Basketball League	Brydens Stadium	1992	3
Western Sydney Wanderers FC	A-League Men	Western Sydney Stadium	2012	1 (P'ship), Nil (C'ships)
Wests Tigers	National Rugby League	Campbelltown Stadium, Leichhardt Oval, Western Sydney Stadium	2000	1

== Venues ==
=== Venues in national competitions ===
Venue	Capacity	Main sports
Stadium Australia	83,500	Rugby league, rugby union, soccer
Royal Randwick Racecourse	50,000+	Horse racing
Sydney Cricket Ground	47,000	Cricket, Australian rules football
Sydney Football Stadium	45,000	Rugby league, rugby union, soccer
Sydney Showground Stadium	25,000	Australian rules football
Belmore Sports Ground	25,000	Rugby league, soccer
Brookvale Oval	23,000	Rugby league
Penrith Stadium	22,500	Rugby league
Jubilee Oval	22,000	Rugby league
Leichhardt Oval	22,000	Rugby league
Endeavour Field	22,000	Rugby league
Western Sydney Stadium	30,000	Rugby league, soccer
Campbelltown Stadium	20,000	Rugby league
Concord Oval	20,000	Rugby union
North Sydney Oval	20,000	Cricket, rugby league
Redfern Oval	5,000	Rugby league
Sydney Olympic Park Tennis Centre	10,000	Tennis
Australian Equine and Livestock Events Centre	4,020	Equestrian
Dunc Gray Velodrome	3,150	Cycling
Australian Golf Club		Golf
Canterbury Racecourse		Horse racing
Rosehill Racecourse		Horse racing
Sydney Motorsport Park		Motorsports
Warwick Farm Racecourse		Horse racing

=== Sydney Olympic Park ===
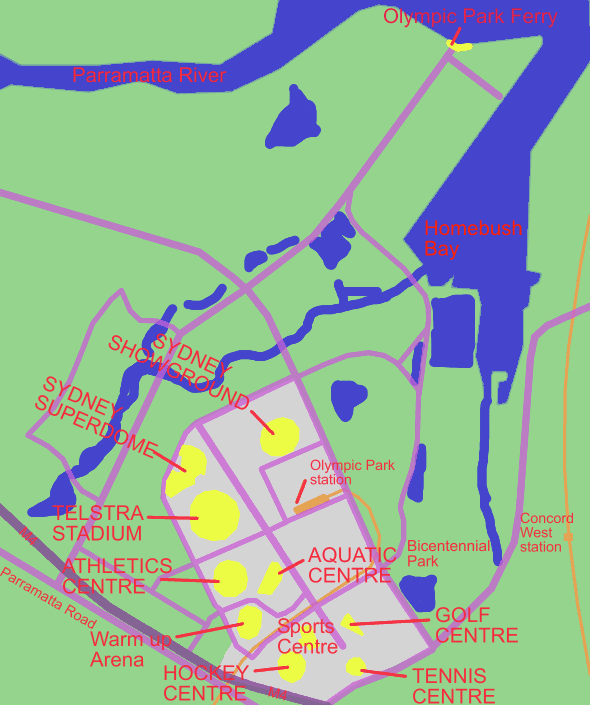
Map of Sydney Olympic Park, showing the sporting facilities there

Sydney Olympic Park is roughly in the geographical centre of Sydney. Created for the 2000 Summer Olympics, it is now a major sporting centre in the city.

==== Sydney SuperDome ====
Sydney SuperDome hosts miscellaneous events as Sydney's premier indoors facility. It has a maximum capacity of 21,000.

==== Stadium Australia ====
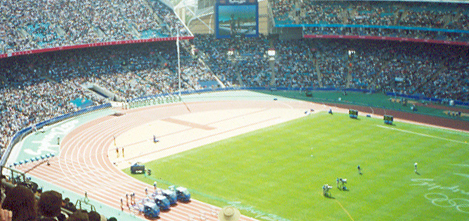
Track and field events in during the 2000 Summer Olympics

Stadium Australia, sponsored as Accor Stadium, is Sydney's largest stadium. Built for the 2000 Summer Olympics, it now hosts big events such as the NRL Grand Final, the rugby league State of Origin and rugby union and soccer internationals.

The venue is the home ground of NRL teams, the Canterbury-Bankstown Bulldogs and the South Sydney Rabbitohs and serves as an occasional home ground for the Parramatta Eels. Stadium Australia also hosts a number of Sydney Swans home games and the occasional domestic cricket one-day match.

==== Other facilities ====
There are various other sporting and recreational facilities in the centre including another indoor arena, tennis centre, aquatic centre, athletics centre, hockey centre, archery centre, as well as the Sydney Showground. From 2009 until 2016, the area hosted a motor race in the form of the Sydney 500 on a street circuit within the former Olympic grounds.

=== Moore Park & Randwick ===
==== Sydney Football Stadium ====
Sydney Football Stadium (1988) was designed for the use of rugby league and is also used for rugby union and soccer. The Sydney Roosters, the NSW Waratahs and Sydney FC soccer team used it as their home ground. The Wests Tigers used the stadium part-time as a home ground. The ground hosted the 2005–06 A-League grand final won by Sydney FC. The ground also hosted rugby league grand finals from its construction until Stadium Australia was opened. It was demolished in 2019 to make way for the Sydney Football Stadium (2022).

==== Sydney Cricket Ground ====
The Sydney Cricket Ground is mainly used for cricket games and Australian rules football matches. It is home to the Sydney Swans and NSW Blues. The ground held over 1,000 rugby league first-grade matches in its history but since the opening of the Sydney Football Stadium it is now rarely used.

==== Royal Randwick Racecourse ====
Royal Randwick Racecourse, being established in 1833, is a thoroughbred racing venue operated by the Australian Turf Club. The Australia's longest standing racing venue hosts more than 40 race meetings annually, including The Championships in autumn and The Everest in spring, and is also used for conferences, exhibitions and other events. In 2026, the racecourse recorded its highest modern-day attendance when a sell-out crowd of 52,110 attended the tenth running of the $20 million The Everest, the world's richest race on turf.

== See also ==
- Sport in New South Wales
