= Hillvue, New South Wales =

Coordinates: 31°07′29″S 150°54′54″E

Hillvue
- Suburb
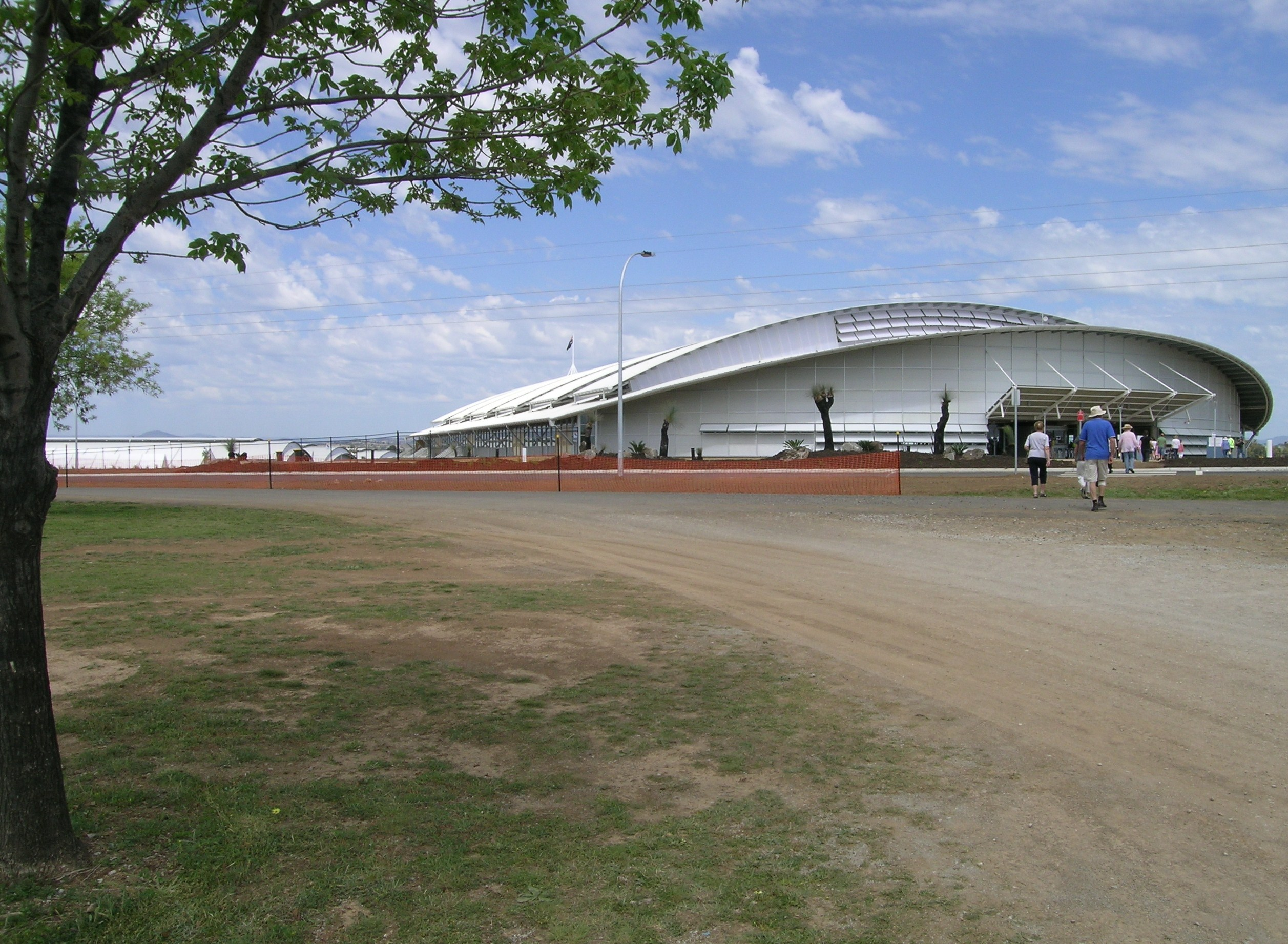
- Australian Equine and Livestock Events Centre
- Interactive map of Hillvue
- Country: Australia
- State: New South Wales
- City: Tamworth
- LGA: Tamworth Regional Council

Government
  - State electorate: Tamworth,
  - Federal division: New England

Population
  - Total: 6,255 (2011 census)
- Postcode: 2340
Suburbs around Hillvue
Coledale	South Tamworth
	Hillvue	Calala
	Kingswood (Tamworth), New South Wales

Hillvue is a suburb of Tamworth, New South Wales, Australia. It is a largely residential suburb of Tamworth and is south of South Tamworth. It has the second highest population estimate of any area of Tamworth, with over six thousand people in 2011.

The longyard shopping area, the Golden Guitar, Roll of Renown, Country Music Centre and the Tamworth Regional Entertainment Centre are all located in Hillvue. The Prime TV Station and 2TM Radio Station are also located in the suburb along the New England Highway. Further along the New England Highway on the suburb's outskirts is the $28.8 million Australian Equine and Livestock Events Centre.

== Locality ==
The North boundary of Hillvue is Hillvue Road, Wilburtree Street and Calala Lane. Goonoo Goonoo Creek is the suburb's boundary in the east; the suburb of Kingswood is the boundary in the south and the Main North railway line is the boundary in the west.

== Sport ==
The Longyard Golf course is located in Hillvue in Greg Norman Drive. The golf course was designed by Greg Norman. The Tamworth Regional Sporting Complex is located in Hillvue near the Tamworth Regional Entertainment Centre and the complex includes water-based hockey fields, the Tamworth Athletics track and a gymnastics complex. The Hillvue Rovers Football club although they do not play in Hillvue draw most of their players and supporters from the suburb.

== Schools ==
- Hillvue Primary School
- Liberty College
