= Kingswood (Tamworth), New South Wales =

Coordinates: 31°09′30″S 150°54′33″E

Kingswood
- Suburb
- Interactive map of Kingswood
- Country: Australia
- State: New South Wales
- City: Tamworth
- LGA: Tamworth Regional Council

Government
  - State electorate: Tamworth,
  - Federal division: New England

Population
  - Total: 1,142 (SAL 2021)
- Postcode: 2340
Suburbs around Kingswood
Hillvue	Calala
Kingswood

Kingswood is an outer-suburb of Tamworth, New South Wales, located south of the city. It is located off the New England Highway and is located south of the suburb Hillvue and is a largely rural residential suburb. North East/East of Kingswood is the suburb Calala.
