= Sport in New South Wales =

Sports traditions and activities in a state of Australia

Sport in New South Wales describes participation in and attendance at organised sports events in the state of New South Wales in Australia. Sport forms an integral part of the culture of the state.

New South Wales has attracted many international multi-sport events including the 2000 Summer Olympics, held in Sydney. There are many professional sporting teams in New South Wales. The biggest sport in the state by a wide margin is rugby league, in which the state has 10 professional clubs in the National Rugby League. Other popular spectator sports include rugby union, cricket, Australian rules football, horse racing and soccer. In terms of participation, the most popular sports in the state are netball, tennis, soccer, rugby league and touch football.

== Rugby league ==
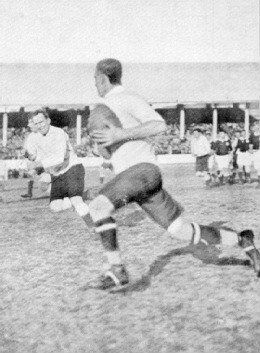
RL Pioneers Dan Frawley(r), Dally Messenger(l) in action NSW v Qld 1912

Sydneysiders view rugby league football – usually called football, footy or simply league – as a sporting tradition within the city. This stems back from the earlier colonial days of the city when the city and its culture were largely dictated by wealthy Englishmen who traditionally played and were supporters of the Rugby code of football, which was largely advertised and passed on to the people of Sydney, including the working class who in back in England largely played soccer. In the early 1900s some Rugby footballers started to agitate to receive match payments. There was widespread disagreement as to whether or not this should happen. The working class strongly believed it was a good idea and that the players should at least share in some of the money which was filling the coffers of the governing body, whilst the middle class were more hesitant to do so. However, the Rugby Football Union would not countenance payments of any sort, even 'broken time' payments for a player whilst an injury made him unable to work was deemed the 'thin edge of the wedge' for professionalism. This resulted in a split similar to what had occurred in England, and the working class formed their own competition, the Rugby League, which followed the same rules as the equivalent breakaway competition in England. The game quickly grew a working-class following, and has been a Sydney tradition ever since. Rugby league is the most attended and viewed sport in the state by a wide margin.

The headquarters of the Australian Rugby League and National Rugby League (NRL) are in Sydney, which is home to nine of the 17 National Rugby League (NRL) football clubs (Canterbury-Bankstown Bulldogs, Cronulla-Sutherland Sharks, Manly-Warringah Sea Eagles, Parramatta Eels, Penrith Panthers, South Sydney Rabbitohs, Sydney Roosters and Wests Tigers), as well as being the northern home of the St George Illawarra Dragons, which is half-based in Wollongong. A tenth team, the Newcastle Knights are located in Newcastle.

The premier state-level league is the New South Wales Cup, involving reserve teams from NSW and Canberra based NRL clubs as well as the first teams from other clubs. Country football is overseen by the New South Wales Country Rugby League. Annual matches between City vs Country Origin teams are held.

The annual State of Origin series between the New South Wales Blues and the Queensland Maroons is a popular sporting event in NSW. Sydney has hosted many State of Origin matches since the series began in 1980. The three-game series are held in Sydney and Brisbane with the first and third games in one city and the second in the other. These rotate every year, so if two games are played in Sydney one year, then those games are played in Brisbane the next.

== Rugby union ==
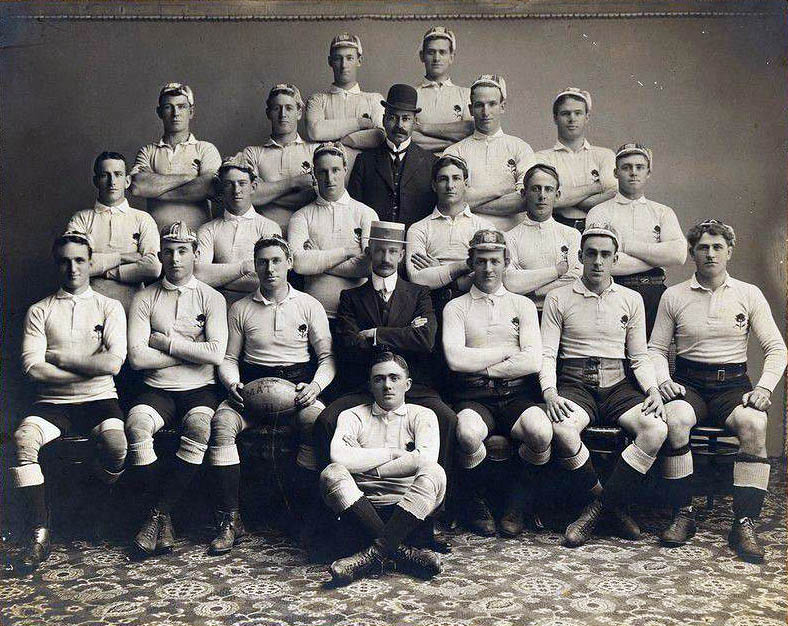
NSW Waratahs team of 1906

Rugby Union was the dominant winter sport prior to the arrival of rugby league. Rugby union commenced in 1870 in Sydney as a club competition with the Wallaroo FC, Sydney University FC, colleges and others. Rugby union is regarded as a middle-class game and is played in many of Sydney's top private schools.

Sydney has a local club rugby union competition (the Shute Shield), and a Super Rugby team the NSW Waratahs, who play their games in the city and represent the entire state of New South Wales. They were represented in the defunct Australian Rugby Championship by Sydney Fleet, Western Sydney Rams and Central Coast Rays. The National Rugby Championship has four NSW teams: Sydney Stars, Greater Sydney Rams, North Harbour Rays and NSW Country Eagles.

The Australian Rugby Union headquarters are located in Moore Park in Sydney. The Waratahs play out of the Sydney Football Stadium, and when in Sydney the Wallabies play out of Stadium Australia.

The New South Wales Waratahs won the Super Rugby title in 2014 in front of a record crowd at Stadium Australia.

== Cricket ==
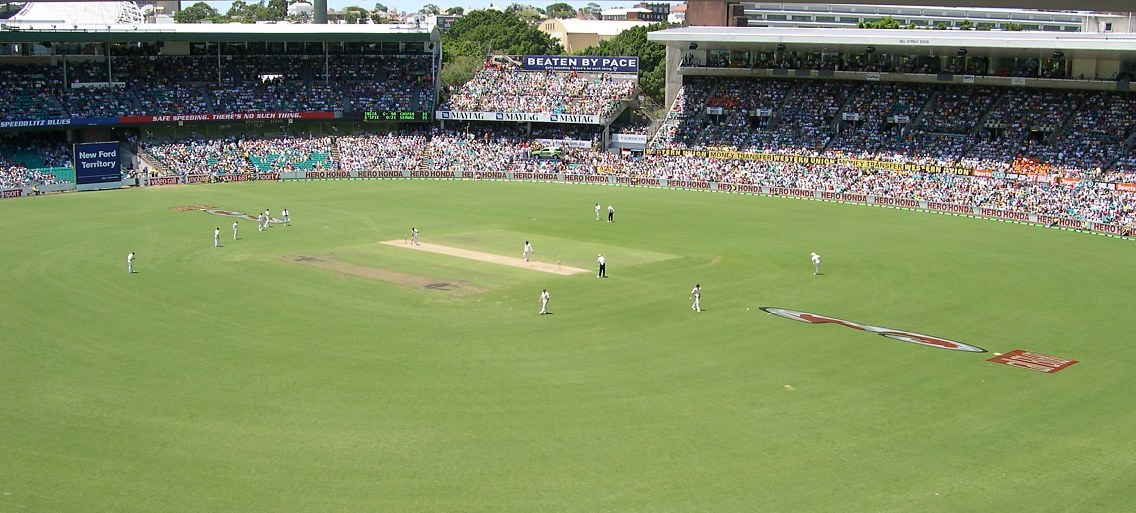
The Sydney Cricket Ground at the 4th Australia vs India test, 2004

Cricket is one of the most popular sports in New South Wales. The NSW Blues are by far the most successful domestic cricket side in Australia having won the First-class competition 44 times and the One-Day Domestic cup nine times. They occasionally play first-class matches against touring International sides. New South Wales have played teams representing every Test-playing nation bar Bangladesh. They have provided the Australian Test and One Day International teams with some of the finest players ever to have graced the game of cricket, the most notable of them being Sir Don Bradman, Steve Waugh, Brett Lee, Glenn McGrath and many others. The current NSW Blues team's main home ground is the Sydney Cricket Ground. In the Twenty20 Big Bash League and Women's Big Bash League, the state is represented by the Sydney Sixers, playing at the Sydney Cricket Ground and the Sydney Thunder, playing at the Sydney Showground.

== Horse Racing ==
Thoroughbred horse racing has been part of organised sport in New South Wales since October 1810, when the first official race meeting was held at Hyde Park in Sydney with the approval of Governor Lachlan Macquarie. The sport's governing body is Racing NSW, established under the Thoroughbred Racing Act 1996 (NSW), which oversees the regulation and administration of thoroughbred racing throughout the state. Racing is divided into metropolitan, provincial and country sectors. NSW has over 125 registered race clubs, with over 700 race meetings held on 363 days annually and on average over 5,000 individual races.

The Australian Turf Club conducts metropolitan racing at Royal Randwick, Rosehill Gardens, Canterbury Park and Warwick Farm. It was formed in 2011 through the merger of the Australian Jockey Club and Sydney Turf Club. Sydney's world-recognised carnivals are held in Spring and Autumn. The autumn carnival includes The Golden Slipper at Rosehill Gardens and The Championships at Royal Randwick, a series held over two Saturdays since 2014.

The spring carnivals includes The Everest, the world's richest race on turf, introduced in 2017, and The Golden Eagle, first run in 2019. The Everest is contested over 1,200 metres at Royal Randwick and, with A$20 million in prizemoney in 2026.

Provincial and country racing. The five provincial race clubs each host a standalone Saturday metropolitan meeting, featuring The Gong at Kembla Grange (conducted by Illawarra Turf Club), The Hunter at Newcastle (conducted by Newcastle Jockey Club), the Hawkesbury Gold Cup at Hawkesbury (conducted by Hawkesbury Race Club), The Lakes at Wyong (conducted by Wyong Race Club) and The Coast at Gosford (conducted by Gosford Race Club). Country racing includes famous country cup carnivals at Grafton, Scone, Wagga Wagga and Albury, right through to smaller community and picnic race meetings held once a year. The Country Championships provides regional qualifying races with 1st and 2nd eligible for the A$1 million final at Royal Randwick. Selected country cups also provide a qualification pathway to A$3 million Big Dance, held at Royal Randwick on the first Tuesday in November.

== Soccer ==
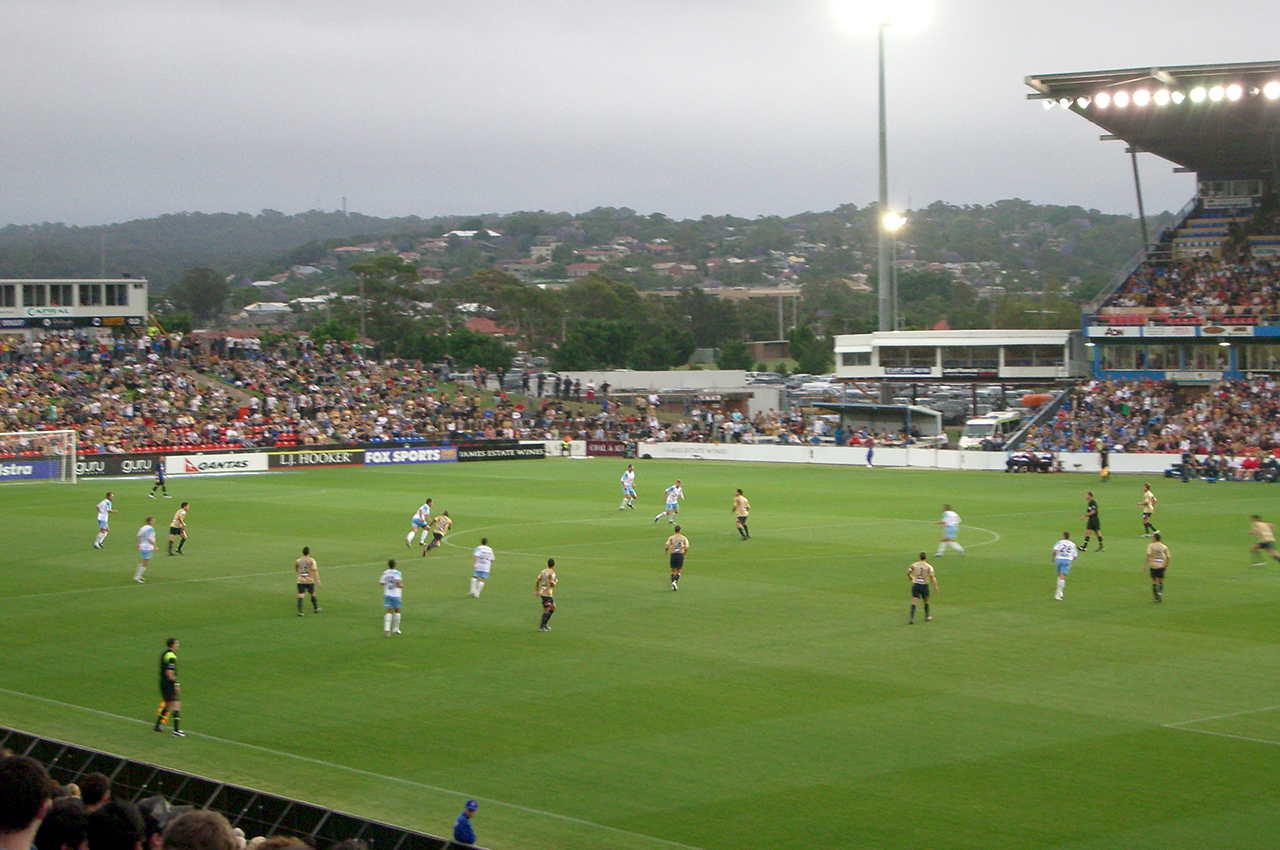
Newcastle Jets and Sydney FC at Newcastle International Sports Centre

Whilst having a strong sporting tradition in the field of Rugby League, Sydney also has a long and strong tradition in soccer. Early soccer clubs in Sydney were relatively small, and did not have very large followings, and like the general population of Sydney in the late 1800s the clubs were largely English in nature, but when the Australian government began its immigration policy in years closely following World War II, many immigrants left Europe in search of new homes in Sydney, and Australia in general. These migrant groups who were subject to racism from the existing population took it upon themselves to found their own soccer clubs, celebrating their particular ethnic communities. The three largest such clubs were founded by the three largest post war immigration groups respectively, they are: Marconi Stallions Football Club (Italian), Sydney Olympic Football Club (Greek), and Sydney United Football Club (Croatian). Along with these larger clubs, there are also many smaller clubs formed by ethnic groups, who also bare suburban names, such as Bankstown City Lions Football Club (Macedonian), Bonnyrigg White Eagles (Serbian), Parramatta Eagles (Maltese), and St. George Saints Football Club (Hungarian). These "ethnic" clubs soon began to dominate soccer in Sydney, drawing large crowd support from their given ethnic groups, and having their fair share of on field success too.

In the late 1980s there was a substantial rise in soccer hooliganism in Sydney as was the case all around the world, but in Sydney, however, it was tainted further by racism which was caused by ethnic affiliations which the majority of the larger Sydney clubs had. This was also coupled with a steady decline in crowd numbers over the years, partly due to violence, partly due to the falling standard of play, but also largely because the clubs were not broadening their supporter bases. For example, Sydney United's support had not grown beyond Sydney's Croatian community, therefore the sport was not capitalising on the growing multiculturalism of the city, now becoming home to many new migrant communities from Arabic and Asian cultures, which to some may be seen as ironic because multiculturalism as well as the fact that the code played all over the world is often seen to be soccer's strongest asset. In an effort to fix these issues facing the game, Football Australia embarked upon "de-ethnicising" soccer, clubs with very strong links to ethnic groups were made to sever links with their traditional supporter bases and broaden their horizons, new clubs were founded and brought into the league such as Parramatta Power and Northern Spirit who did not have ethnic associations in a bid to attract a multicultural fan base. This attempt failed miserably, new clubs failed to attract a following and old clubs were not at all "de-ethnicised".

In 2005 a review of the game was carried out and it was decided that for the game to move forward in Sydney, and around Australia, some drastic changes would have to be made. A new club was founded in Sydney called Sydney FC, and they were to be based in central Sydney as opposed to being based at a small suburban stadium, and were founded specifically to attract a multicultural following. They were entered in a new league to be known as the A-League, this would act as the show piece national competition, contested by similarly formed clubs from other large cities around Australia. There would be no form of relegation or promotion between the a-league and the rest of the counties competitions, and the previous national league would revert to its original form in state-based competitions, which is where clubs such as the for mentioned ethnic clubs continue to play. In the first 6 years of their existence, Sydney FC have been relatively successful building up a solid support base of around 10,000 members, and sometimes attracting crowds of up to 40,000, which is admirable considering the youth of the club. The new system has not been without its flaws for Sydney soccer, however – many of the great clubs, and the largest in the city, are unable to win a national championship, nor are they able to qualify for the Asian Champions League, and a large section of the Greater Sydney Area is simply unable to access this new club due to the geographic size of the city. Change is, however, afoot, as a national cup competition is to be reintroduced in 2012 with the winner qualifying for the champions league, and the imminent foundation of a second new multicultural club in Sydney's sprawling western suburbs due to begin playing matches within two years.

Outside Sydney, soccer has a similar history in the states larger regional cities (albeit on a smaller scale), and similar multicultural clubs have been formed such as: Newcastle Jets and Central Coast Mariners who both play in the A-league, and South Coast Wolves Football Club who play in the New South Wales premier league alongside many of Sydney's ethnic clubs; however, there have been calls for them to be elevated into the A-league, and it is expected that they eventually will be.

== Basketball ==
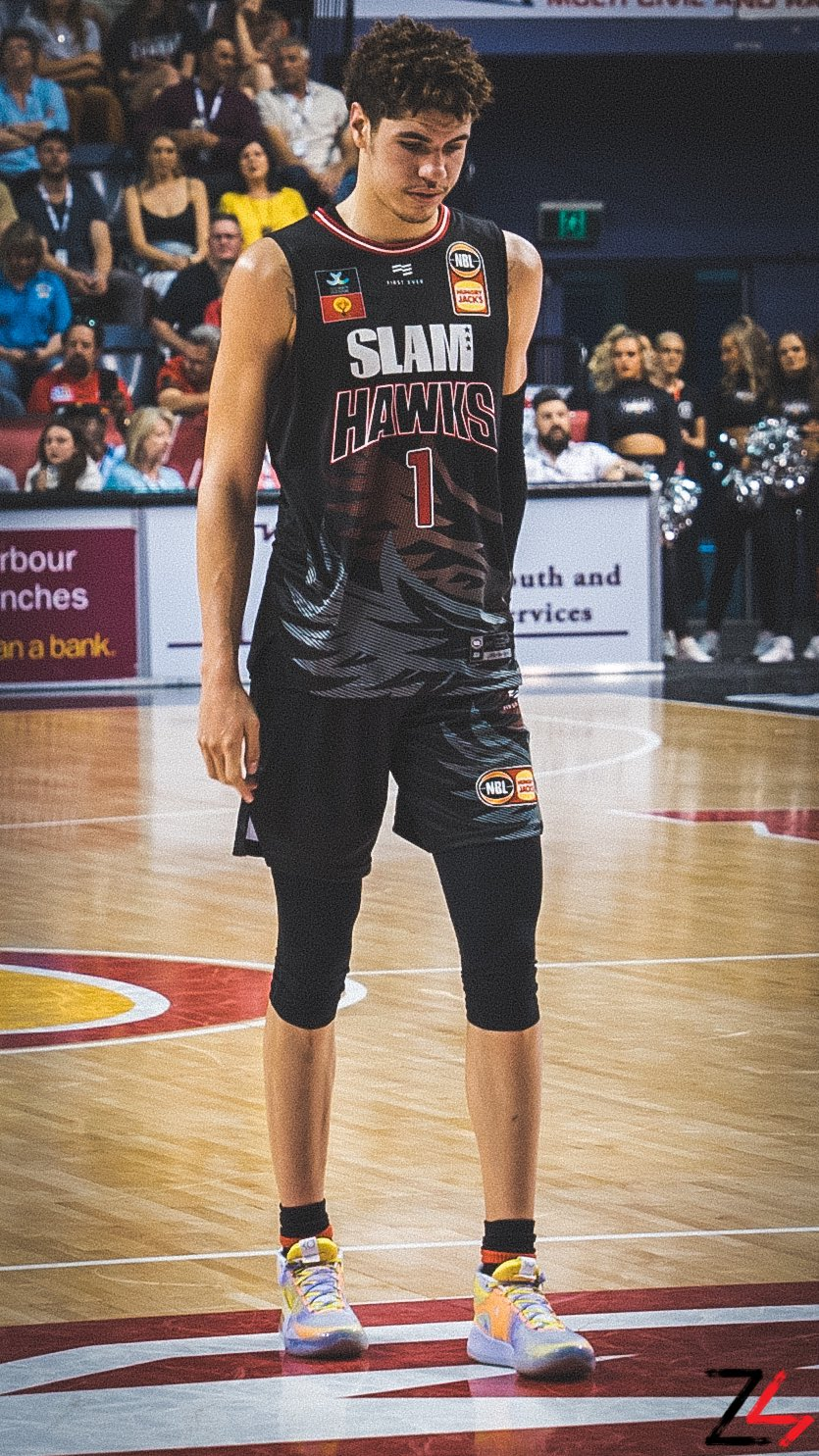
Lamelo Ball was a notable signing by the Illawarra Hawks

The Sydney Kings and Illawarra Hawks are the state's representatives in the National Basketball League (NBL), Australia's premier Men's basketball competition. The Kings won three consecutive premierships in 2002–03, 2003–04 and 2004–05, while the Hawks won in 2001. The Sydney Kings play their home games at the Sydney SuperDome in Sydney while the Illawarra Hawks play home games at Wollongong Entertainment Centre in Wollongong, the Illawarra's commercial centre.

The next level below the NBL Championship is NBL1, New South Wales will be represented as the East conference from 2022 onward. This conference will be made of select teams from the Waratah League, the current premier league for clubs in New South Wales. NBL1 and Waratah League have Men's and Women's competitions.

The Sydney Uni Flames are a professional women's side who play in the Women's National Basketball League.

== Australian rules football ==
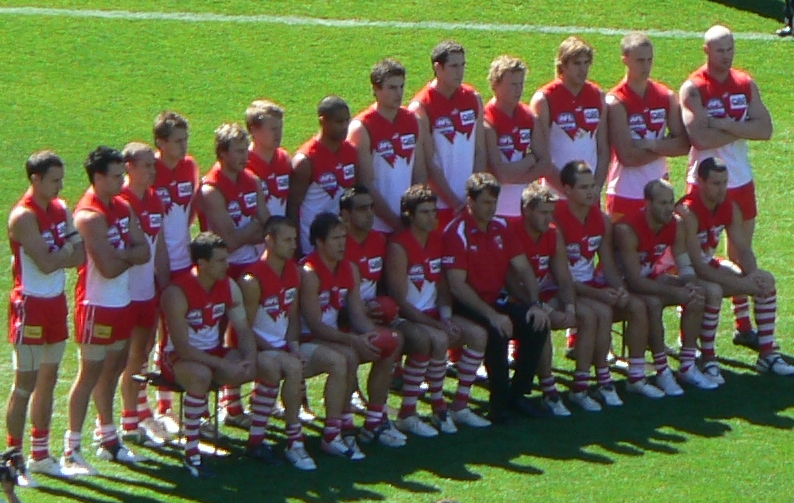
The Sydney Swans 2006 AFL Grand Final team

Australian rules football, commonly known in NSW as "AFL" (after the national professional Australian Football League competition), is a developing game in most of NSW with increasing popularity. Ausplay reported that there were 69,168 regular participants in New South Wales in 2019 a figure that exceeds participation in rugby union making it the 3rd most participated football code in the state. The sport is governed by AFL NSW/ACT.

Two fully professional teams are based in New South Wales, both from Sydney: the Sydney Swans and the Greater Western Sydney Giants. Formerly the South Melbourne Swans, the financially struggling club was relocated in 1982 and was renamed Sydney to capture a wider audience. After a long period with little success Sydney made the first of its six Grand Final appearances in 1996 and the first of two premierships in 2005. Since its first Grand Final appearance, Sydney has consistently averaged over 24,000 spectators to each home match, reaching a peak average home attendance of 36,612 in 1997. In 2003, Sydney drew a New South Wales record crowd of 72,393 which remains the record attendance in the history of the game for a match played outside of Victoria. The Giants, based in Western Sydney, were introduced in 2012. The two teams compete against each other in the Sydney Derby which drew a record crowd of 60,222 in 2016. The Giants have competed in the AFL Women's competition since its commencement in 2017 and the Swans have been granted a license to join in 2023.

Historically the game dates back to the 1880s in Sydney with the establishment of local competitions established in 1880; however, it has struggled for marketshare against other football codes. Its popularity is highest in the Southern Riverina region closer to the Victorian border.

== Snow sports ==
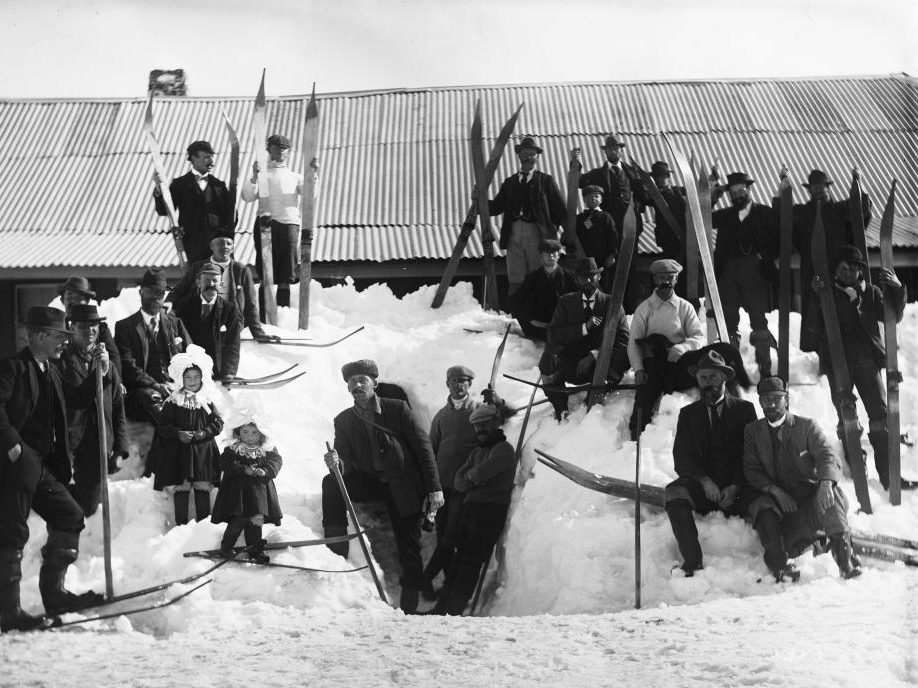
Kiandra, NSW, where skiing began in Australia in 1861

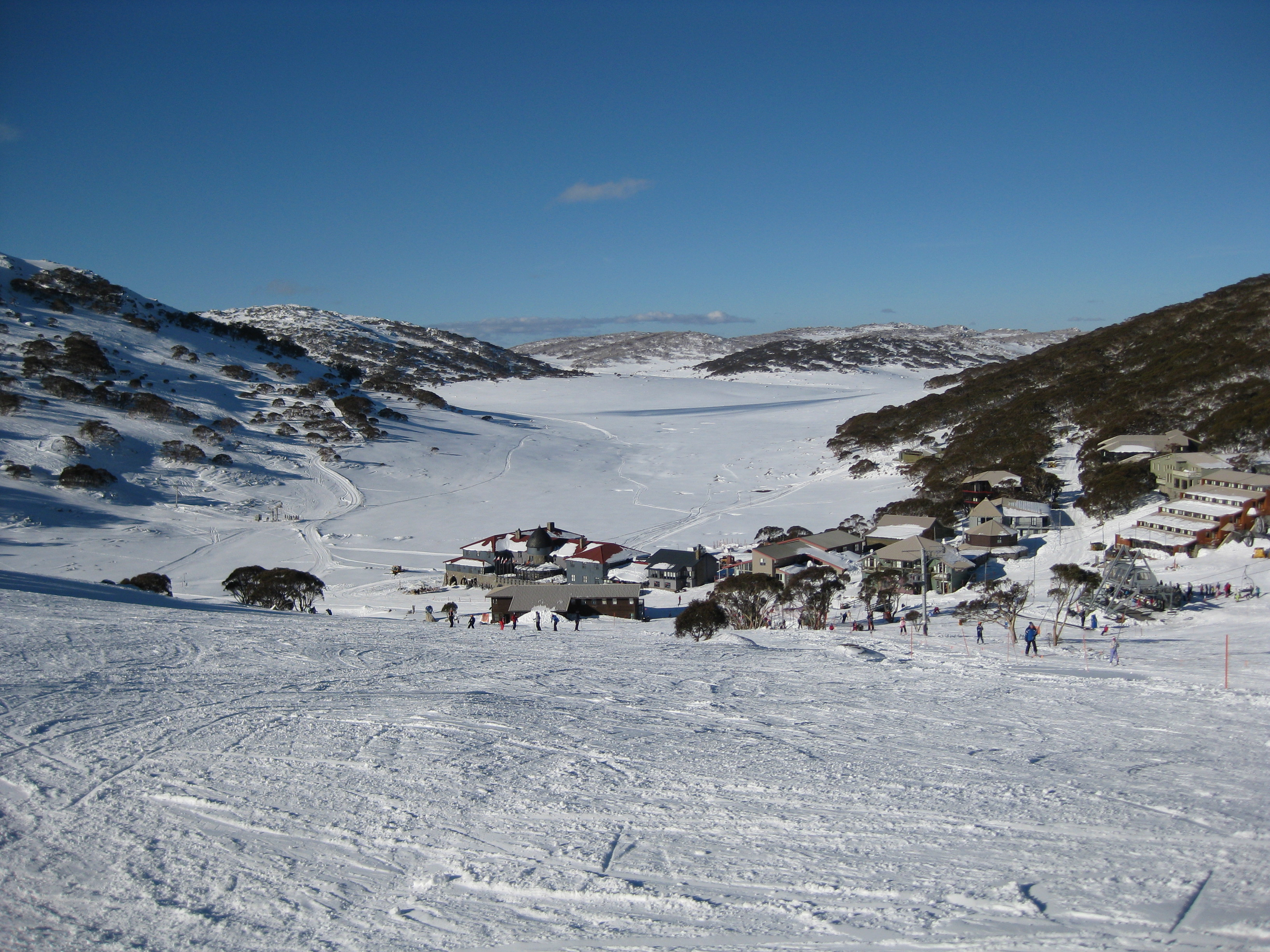
Charlotte Pass, a pioneer of the Australian ski industry. Village Elevation at 1760m.

New South Wales is home to Australia's highest snow country, oldest skifields and largest resorts. Recreational skiing in Australia began around 1861 at Kiandra, New South Wales, when Norwegian gold miners introduced the idea to the frozen hills around the town. The first and longest surviving ski club in the world, the Kiandra Snow Shoe Club is believed to have been formed at Kiandra in that year.

The Kiandra snow shoe club (now called the Kiandra Pioneer Ski Club (1861)) remains the world's first identifiable and ceaseless Ski Club. This Australian club has been continuously operating since 1861. Its origins have been recognised internationally and substantiated by the Holmenkollen Ski Museum, Norway in 2006. The discovery of gold in the mountains of America and Australia was the catalyst for the development of recreational alpine skiing. The Kiandra Goldrush was short-lived, but the township remained a service centre for recreational and survival skiing for over a century. Australia's first T-bar lift was installed at Kiandra in 1957, but the ski facilities were finally shifted up the hill to Selwyn Snowfields in 1978. Steeper slopes and more reliable snows lie further to the south and in the 20th century, the focus of recreational skiing in New South Wales shifted southward, to the Mount Kosciuszko region.

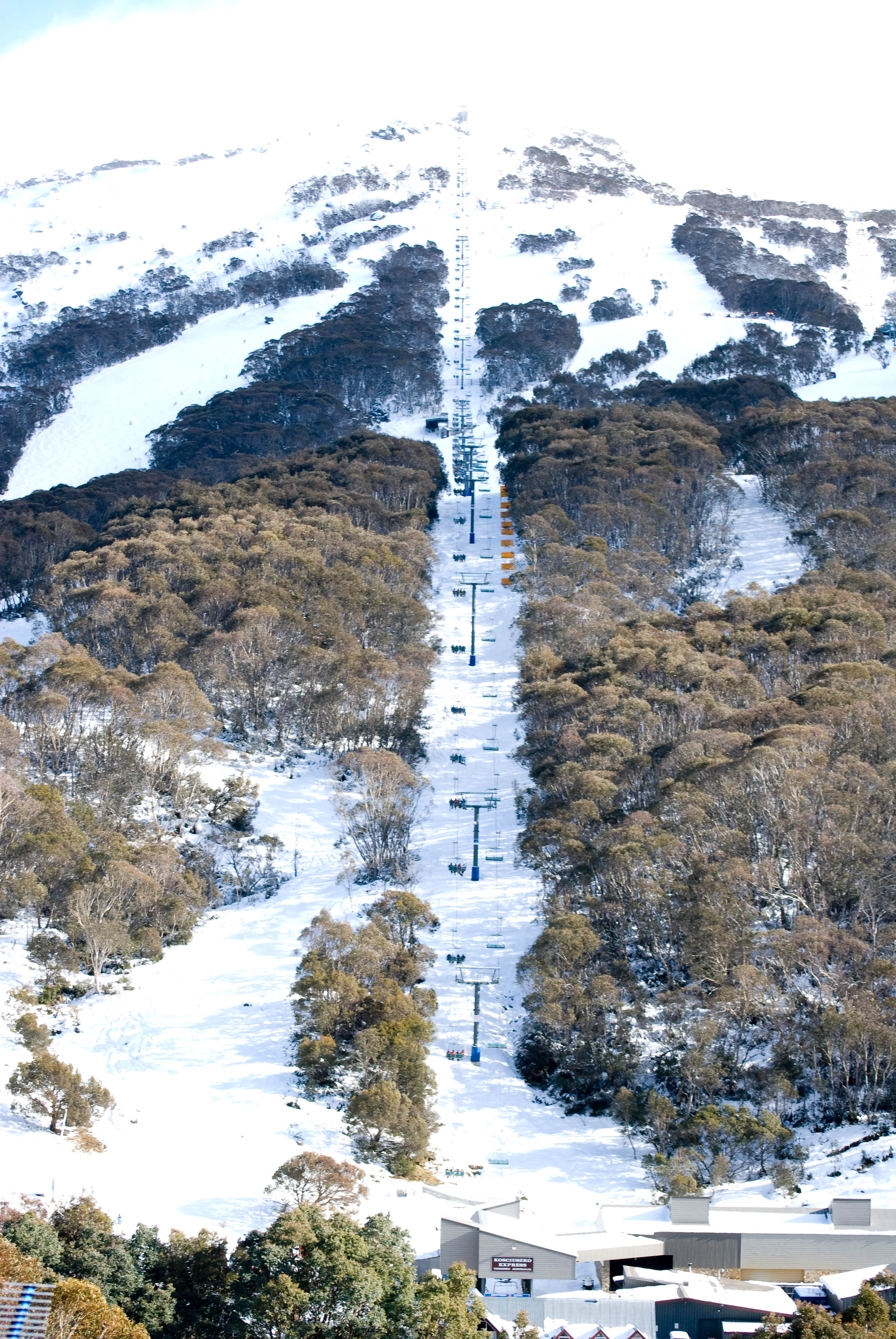
Thredbo, has the largest vertical drop of any Australian ski resort at 672m

The first Kosciuszko Chalet was built at Charlotte Pass in 1930, giving relatively comfortable access to Australia's highest terrain. At 1760m, Charlotte Pass has the highest village base elevation of any Australian ski resort and can only be accessed via over-snow transport in winter. The growing number of ski enthusiasts heading to Charlotte Pass led to the establishment of a cafe at Smiggin Holes around 1939, where horse-drawn sleighs would deliver skiers to begin the arduous ski to the Kosciusko Chalet. It was the construction of the vast Snowy Mountains Hydro-Electric Scheme from 1949 that really opened up the Snowy Mountains for large-scale development of a ski industry and led to the establishment of Thredbo and Perisher as leading Australian resorts. The Construction of Guthega Dam brought skiers to the isolated Guthega district and a rope tow was installed there in 1957.

Skifields up by Kosciusko's side were also established during this period, though their existence is now little realised. A rope tow was installed on Mount Northcote at the site and opened in 1954. The site proved excellent for speed skiing, but the hut was destroyed in an avalanche, which also killed one person, in 1956. Construction began at Thredbo in 1957. Today, Thredbo has 14 ski-lifts and possesses Australia's longest ski resort run, the 5.9 km from Karel's T-Bar to Friday Flat; Australia's greatest vertical drop of 672m; and the highest lifted point in Australia at 2037m

The last establishment of a major skifield in NSW came with the development of Mount Blue Cow in the 1980s. In 1987 the Swiss designed Skitube Alpine Railway opened to deliver skiers from Bullocks Flat, on the Alpine Way, to Perisher Valley and to Blue Cow, which also opened in 1987. The operators of Blue Cow purchased Guthega in 1991, and the new combined resort later merged with Perisher-Smiggins to become the largest ski resort in the Southern Hemisphere. In 2009 Perisher had 48 lifts covering 1,245 hectares and four village base areas: Perisher Valley, Blue Cow, Smiggin Holes and Guthega.

The Kosciuszko Main Range in the Snowy Mountains of New South Wales offer some of the most challenging cross-country and back-country skiing in Australia, notably Watsons Crags and Mount Twynam on the steep Western Face of the Range. The Mount Jagungal wilderness area provides some of the most isolated back-country ski terrain. High country huts, often a legacy of the era of cattle grazing in the mountains, provide emergency shelter in these regions.

== Netball ==
Super Netball features two New South Wales based teams. The New South Wales Swifts are an established club, having previously played in the ANZ Championship and the Commonwealth Bank Trophy. Giants Netball were formed when the Greater Western Sydney Giants football club were given one of the three licenses for new teams for the first season of the Super Netball league in 2017.

== Other teams ==
There are also many teams participating in other national sporting competitions based in New South Wales, mainly in Sydney and the surrounding areas. These include the Sydney Blue Sox in Australian Baseball League. The state's only major motorsport team is Albury based Brad Jones Racing.

== Other events ==
The popular equine sports of campdrafting and polocrosse were developed in New South Wales and competitions are now held across Australia. Polocrosse is now played in many overseas countries. Rodeos are popular events for competitors and spectators alike. The most important equine events in the state and the country are held at the Australian Equine and Livestock Events Centre in Tamworth in the states New England region.

Sydney was the host of the 2000 Summer Olympics and the 1938 British Empire Games. The Olympic Stadium, now known as Stadium Australia, is the scene of the annual NRL Grand Final. It also regularly hosts rugby league State of Origin as well as rugby union and soccer internationals. It hosted the final of the 2003 Rugby World Cup and the memorable soccer World Cup qualifier between Australia and Uruguay.

The Sydney Cricket Ground traditionally hosts the 'New Year' cricket test match from 2 to 6 January each year. The Sydney to Hobart Yacht Race begins in Sydney Harbour on Boxing Day, while the Bathurst 12 Hour and Bathurst 1000 are held at Mount Panorama.

The City to Surf foot race is held every August and is one of the largest timed foot races in the world.

== New South Wales Sports Awards ==
Each year the New South Wales Sport Awards are held. The major award is the Sport Star of the Year:

- 1994 Michelle Martin – Squash
- 1995 Michelle Martin – Squash
- 1996 Alyson Annan – Hockey
- 1997 Chris McCormack – Triathlon
- 1998 Ian Thorpe – Swimming
- 1999 Ian Thorpe – Swimming
- 2000 Layne Beachley – Surfing
- 2001 Ian Thorpe – Swimming
- 2002 Layne Beachley – Surfing
- 2003 Layne Beachley – Surfing
- 2004 Petria Thomas – Swimming
- 2005 Kate Bates – Cycling
- 2006 Brad Kahlefeldt – Triathlon
- 2007 Casey Stoner – Motorcycling
- 2008 Matthew Mitcham – Diving
- 2009 Dani Samuels – Track & Field
- 2010 Stephanie Gilmore – Surfing & Tom Slingsby – Sailing
- 2011 Tom Slingsby – Sailing
- 2012 Michael Clarke – Cricket
- 2013 Jessica Fox – Canoe Slalom

== Current professional franchises in national competitions ==
=== Sydney ===
Club	League	Venue	Established	Premierships
Canterbury-Bankstown Bulldogs	National Rugby League	Belmore Sports Ground, Stadium Australia	1935	8
Cronulla-Sutherland Sharks	National Rugby League	Endeavour Field	1967	1
Greater Western Sydney Giants	Australian Football League; AFL Women's	Blacktown ISP Oval, Sydney Showground Stadium	2012	Nil
Giants Netball	Suncorp Super Netball	Ken Rosewall Arena, Sydney SuperDome	2016	Nil
Macarthur FC	A-League Men	Campbelltown Stadium	2018	Nil
Manly-Warringah Sea Eagles	National Rugby League	Brookvale Oval	1947	8
New South Wales Men's Cricket Team	Sheffield Shield/One Day Cup	Sydney Cricket Ground / North Sydney Oval	1856	46 (Sheffield Shield), 9 (One Day Cup), 1 (T20 Bash)
New South Wales Swifts	Suncorp Super Netball	Ken Rosewall Arena, Sydney SuperDome	2008	1
New South Wales Waratahs	Super Rugby	Sydney Football Stadium	1882	1
New South Wales Waratahs (field hockey)	Australian Hockey League	Sydney Olympic Park Hockey Centre	1991	3
Parramatta Eels	National Rugby League	Western Sydney Stadium	1947	4
Penrith Panthers	National Rugby League	Penrith Stadium	1967	4
St George Illawarra Dragons	National Rugby League	Jubilee Oval, Wollongong Showground	1999	1
South Sydney Rabbitohs	National Rugby League	Stadium Australia, Sydney Football Stadium	1908	21
Sydney Bears	Australian Ice Hockey League	Macquarie Ice Rink	1982	2
Sydney Blue Sox	Australian Baseball League	Blacktown International Sportspark	2009	Nil
Sydney FC	A-League	Sydney Football Stadium	2005	2 (P'ships), 3 (C'ships), 2 (WL P'ships), 2 (WL C'ships)
Sydney Ice Dogs	Australian Ice Hockey League	Macquarie Ice Rink	2002	2
Sydney Kings	National Basketball League	Sydney Olympic Park Sports Centre	1988	3
Sydney Roosters	National Rugby League	Sydney Football Stadium, Stadium Australia	1908	13
Sydney Sixers	Big Bash League	Sydney Cricket Ground	2011	1
Sydney Swans	Australian Football League	Sydney Cricket Ground	1874	5
Sydney Thunder	Big Bash League	Sydney Showground Stadium	2011	1 (BBL), 1 (WBBL)
Sydney Flames	Women's National Basketball League	Brydens Stadium	1992	3
Western Sydney Wanderers FC	A-League	Western Sydney Stadium, Sydney Football Stadium	2012	1 (P'ship), Nil (C'ships)
Wests Tigers	National Rugby League	Campbelltown Stadium, Leichhardt Oval, Western Sydney Stadium	2000	1

=== Outside Sydney ===
Club	League	Venue	Established	Premierships
Central Coast Mariners FC	A-League	Central Coast Stadium	2005	2 (P'ships), 1 (C'ship)
Illawarra Hawks	National Basketball League	Wollongong Entertainment Centre	1979	2
Newcastle Jets FC	A-League	Newcastle International Sports Centre	2005	1 (C'ship)
Newcastle Knights	National Rugby League	Newcastle International Sports Centre	1988	2
Newcastle Northstars	Australian Ice Hockey League	Hunter Ice Skating Stadium	2002	5 (P'ships), 6 (C'ship)

== Venues ==
=== Sydney ===
Venue	Capacity	Main Sports
Stadium Australia	83,500	Rugby league, rugby union, soccer
Royal Randwick Racecourse	50,000+	Horse racing
Sydney Cricket Ground	47,000	Cricket, Australian rules football
Sydney Football Stadium	44,000	Rugby league, rugby union, soccer
Sydney Showground Stadium	25,000	Australian rules football
Belmore Sports Ground	25,000	Rugby league, soccer
Brookvale Oval	23,000	Rugby league
Penrith Stadium	22,500	Rugby league
Jubilee Oval	22,000	Rugby league
Leichhardt Oval	22,000	Rugby league
Endeavour Field	22,000	Rugby league
Western Sydney Stadium	30,000	Rugby league, soccer
Campbelltown Stadium	20,000	Rugby league
Concord Oval	20,000	Rugby union
North Sydney Oval	20,000	Cricket, rugby league
Redfern Oval	5,000	Rugby league
Sydney Olympic Park Tennis Centre	10,000	Tennis
Australian Equine and Livestock Events Centre	4,020	Equestrian
Dunc Gray Velodrome	3,150	Track cycling
Macquarie Ice Rink	2,000	Ice hockey, figure skating, speed skating
Australian Golf Club		Golf
Canterbury Racecourse		Horse racing
Rosehill Racecourse		Horse racing
Sydney Motorsport Park		Motorsports
Warwick Farm Racecourse		Horse racing

=== Outside Sydney ===
Venue	Capacity	Main Sports	Location
Newcastle International Sports Centre	33,000	Rugby league, soccer	Newcastle
Wollongong Showground	23,750	Rugby league	Wollongong
Central Coast Stadium	20,059	Soccer, rugby league	Gosford
Seiffert Oval	15,000	Rugby league, soccer	Queanbeyan
Newcastle Entertainment Centre	7,528	Basketball, netball	Newcastle
Wollongong Entertainment Centre	6,000	Basketball	Wollongong
Hunter Ice Skating Stadium	1,000	Ice hockey, figure skating	Warners Bay
Mount Panorama Circuit		Motor racing	Bathurst

=== Sydney Olympic Park ===
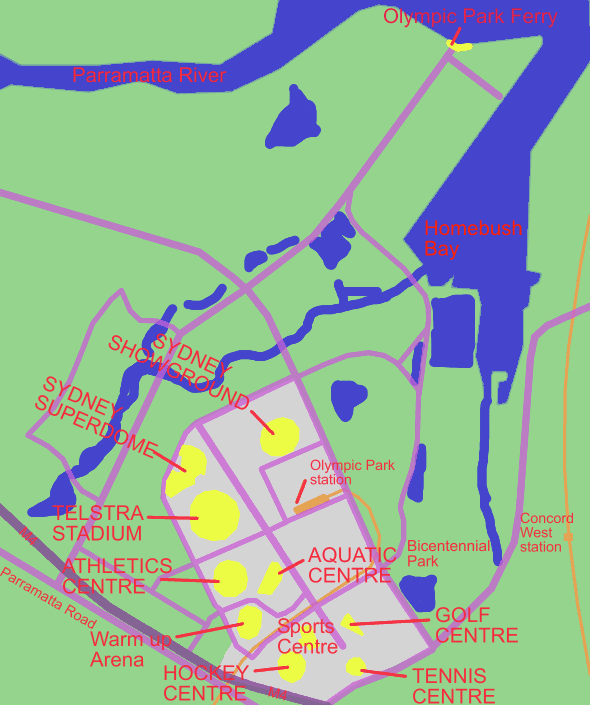
Map of Sydney Olympic Park, showing the sporting facilities there

Sydney Olympic Park is roughly in the geographical centre of Sydney. Created for the 2000 Olympics, it is now a major sporting centre in the city.

==== Sydney SuperDome ====
Sydney SuperDome hosts miscellaneous events as Sydney's premier indoors facility. It has a maximum capacity of 21,000.

==== Stadium Australia ====
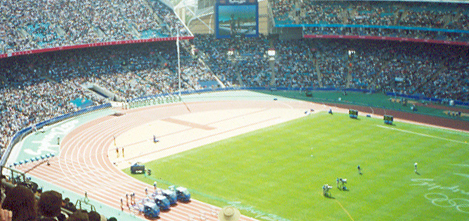
Track and field events during the 2000 Summer Olympics.

Stadium Australia is Sydney's largest stadium. Built for the 2000 Olympics, it now hosts big events such as the NRL Grand Final, the rugby league State of Origin and rugby union and soccer internationals.

The venue is the home ground of NRL teams, the Canterbury-Bankstown Bulldogs and the South Sydney Rabbitohs and serves as an occasional home ground for the Parramatta Eels. Stadium Australia also hosts a number of Sydney Swans home games and the occasional domestic cricket one-day match.

==== Other facilities ====
There are various other sporting and recreational facilities in the centre including another indoor arena, tennis centre, aquatic centre, athletics centre, hockey centre, archery centre, as well as the Sydney Showground. From 2009 until 2016, the area hosted a motor race in the form of the Sydney 500 on a street circuit within the former Olympic grounds.

=== Moore Park & Randwick ===
==== Sydney Football Stadium ====
The Sydney Football Stadium was designed for the use of rugby league and is now also used for rugby union and soccer. The Sydney Roosters, the NSW Waratahs and Sydney FC soccer team use it as their home ground. The Wests Tigers use the stadium part-time as a home ground. Its predecessor hosted the 2005–06 A-League grand final won by Sydney FC and rugby league grand finals from 1988 until 1998.

==== Sydney Cricket Ground ====
The Sydney Cricket Ground is mainly used for cricket games and Aussie rules matches. It is home to the Sydney Swans and NSW Blues. The ground held over 1000 rugby league first-grade matches in its history but is rarely used anymore.

==== Royal Randwick Racecourse ====
Royal Randwick Racecourse, being established in 1833, is a thoroughbred racing venue operated by the Australian Turf Club. Australia's longest standing racing venue hosts more than 40 race meetings annually, including The Championships in the autumn and The Everest in the spring, and is also used for conferences, exhibitions and other events. In 2026, the racecourse recorded its highest modern-day attendance when a sell-out crowd of 52,110 attended the tenth running of the A$20 million The Everest, the world's richest race on turf.
