= Tamworth Regional Entertainment Centre =

Australian indoor arena

Tamworth Regional Entertainment Conference Centre
- TRECC
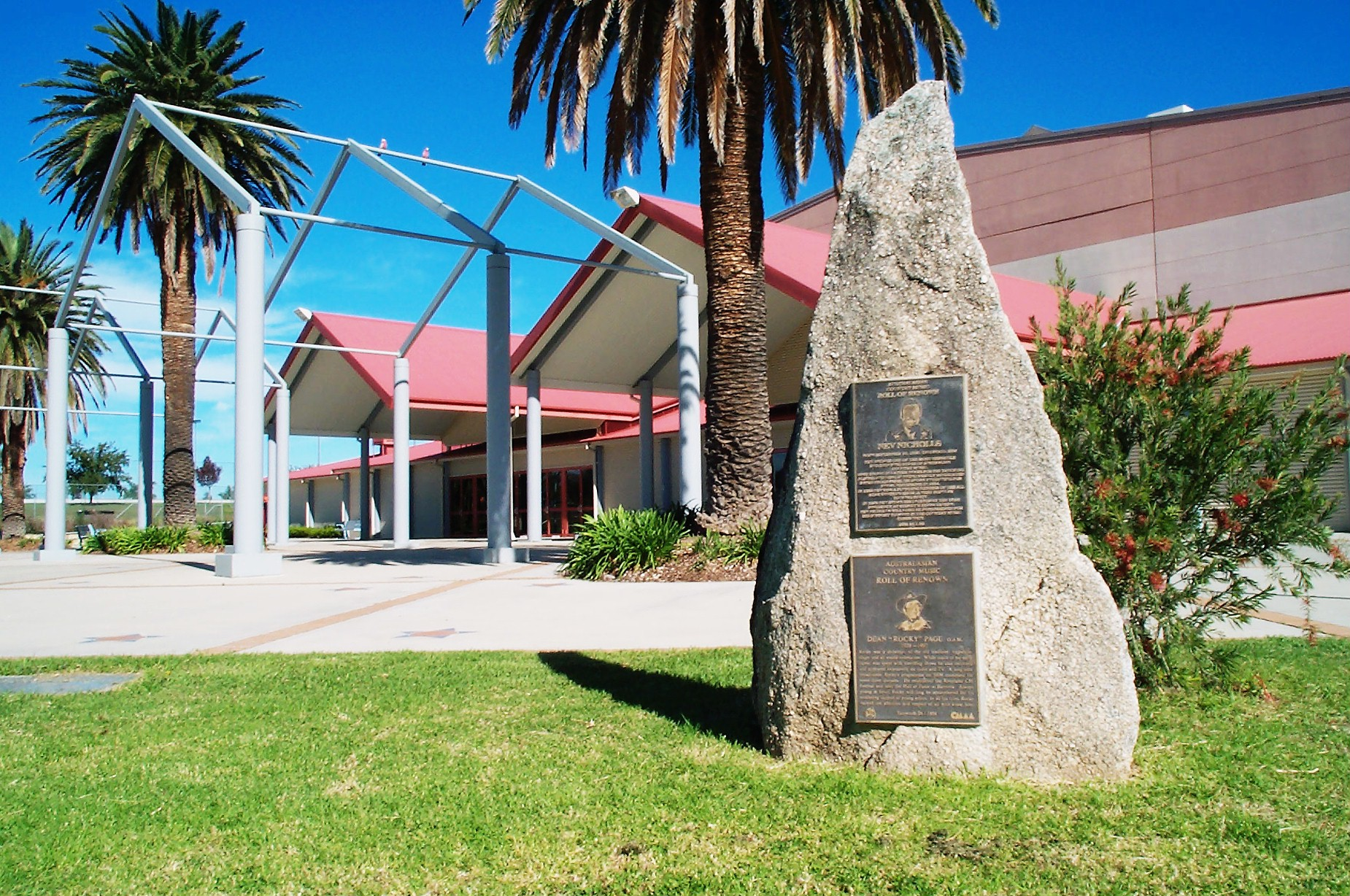
- Interactive map of Tamworth Regional Entertainment Conference Centre
- Location: Greg Norman Drive, Tamworth, New South Wales 2340
- Coordinates: 31°7′50″S 150°55′9″E
- Owner: Tamworth Regional Council
- Operator: Tamworth Regional Council
- Capacity: 4,800 (full concert mode); 3,300 (Lyric Mode); 1,800 (Intimate Mode)

Construction
- Opened: 22 January 1999

Tamworth Regional Entertainment Conference Centre (TRECC) is an Australian arena, located approximately 6 km south of the Tamworth Central Business District, in the suburb of Hillvue and is within walking distance to good accommodation, retail and hospitality outlets.

It is a multi-purpose centre, offering separate break-out rooms and meeting areas off the main auditorium. It boasts superior audio and visual technology, catering and bar areas, green rooms and flexible stage configurations. TRECC seats up to 4,800 in full Concert Mode, 3,300 in Lyric Mode and 1,800 in Intimate Mode.

== Centre uses ==
TRECC plays host to some spectacular shows including the Toyota Golden Guitar Awards. In between awards nights, its home for everything from rock concerts to agricultural shows, car launches, home exhibitions and school spectaculars.

Other uses for the centre include:

- Concerts
- Theatrical Productions
- Trade Shows, Exhibitions and Product Launches
- Educational exhibitions
- Markets/Fairs
- Major event Dinners/Functions
- Conferences
- Indoor sporting events
- Community events
- Charity events

== Centre history ==
The construction of a large event centre capable of housing a variety of functions on a year-round basis and providing a facility capable of hosting Award ceremonies and concerts associated with the Annual Tamworth Country Music Festival has been on the “drawing boards” in Tamworth for at least 20 years.

Tamworth City Council has decided to construct the Tamworth Regional Exhibition Centre as community owned asset.

The Tamworth Regional Entertainment & Conference Centre has been designed to provide a venue suitable for the staging of multiplicity of large major events, including indoor sports events of an international standard.

The Tamworth Regional Entertainment Conference Centre was officially opened on Friday 22 January 1999 at 11:00am at an opening ceremony held in the centre forecourt.

== Concerts and events ==
Artists that have performed at TREC include Bob Dylan, Dolly Parton, Cold Chisel, The Seekers, Leo Sayer, Silverchair, Powderfinger & Missy Higgins, among others.

Australian bands Silverchair & Powderfinger played at the centre, on 4 September 2007, during their Across the Great Divide Tour, in front of a crowd of 4,500 people.

=== Other events ===
1. 2008 Young Drivers Expo
2. Arrive Alive Eastern University Games
3. Australian Idol
4. Capers School Spectacular
5. Catholic Schools Celebrate
6. Case IH Product Launch
7. Cold Chisel
8. Concert of the Century
9. Country Energy – Conference
10. Doobie Bros
11. Drums Tao – Unrivalled Drumming Spectacular
12. Dwight Yoakam
13. Energy Safety Solutions Exhibition & Competition
14. Food Services Industry & Exhibition
15. Jayco Australia/CMAA Country Music Awards of Australia
16. Jehovah Witness Annual Convention
17. Leo Sayer
18. Local Government Stores Suppliers Exhibition
19. Longway to the Top
20. Livestock & Bulk Carriers Association – Conference & Exhibition
21. Hats Off to Slim Dusty
22. Harlem Gospel Choir
23. Home & Leisure Shows
24. Annual Jehovah's Witness District Convention
25. Namoi Landcare Forum
26. National MG Car Club Rally
27. National View Club Conference
28. North West Dance Festival
29. NSW Country Gymnastics Championships
30. Pink Floyd Tribute
31. Rotary District Conference & Dinner
32. Rural Critical Care Conference
33. School Presentations & Formals
34. Shell Rimula Rig of the Year
35. Silverchair & Powerfinger Tour
36. 75th Anniversary Sydney Symphony Orchestra Concert
37. The Seekers
38. Toyota Country Theatre featuring Troy Cassar-Daley, Sara Storer, John Williamson, Melinda Schnieder, Colin Buchanan, Adam Brand, Gina Jeffreys and more!
39. Tamworth & District Chamber of Commerce & Industry Business Awards
40. Uniting Church Synod Conference & Dinner
41. Westpac Helicopter Annual Ball & Auction
42. Willie Nelson In Concert
43. Dolly Parton

== See also ==
- List of indoor arenas in Australia
