= Australian Equine and Livestock Events Centre =

Arena complex in Tamworth, New South Wales

- AELEC
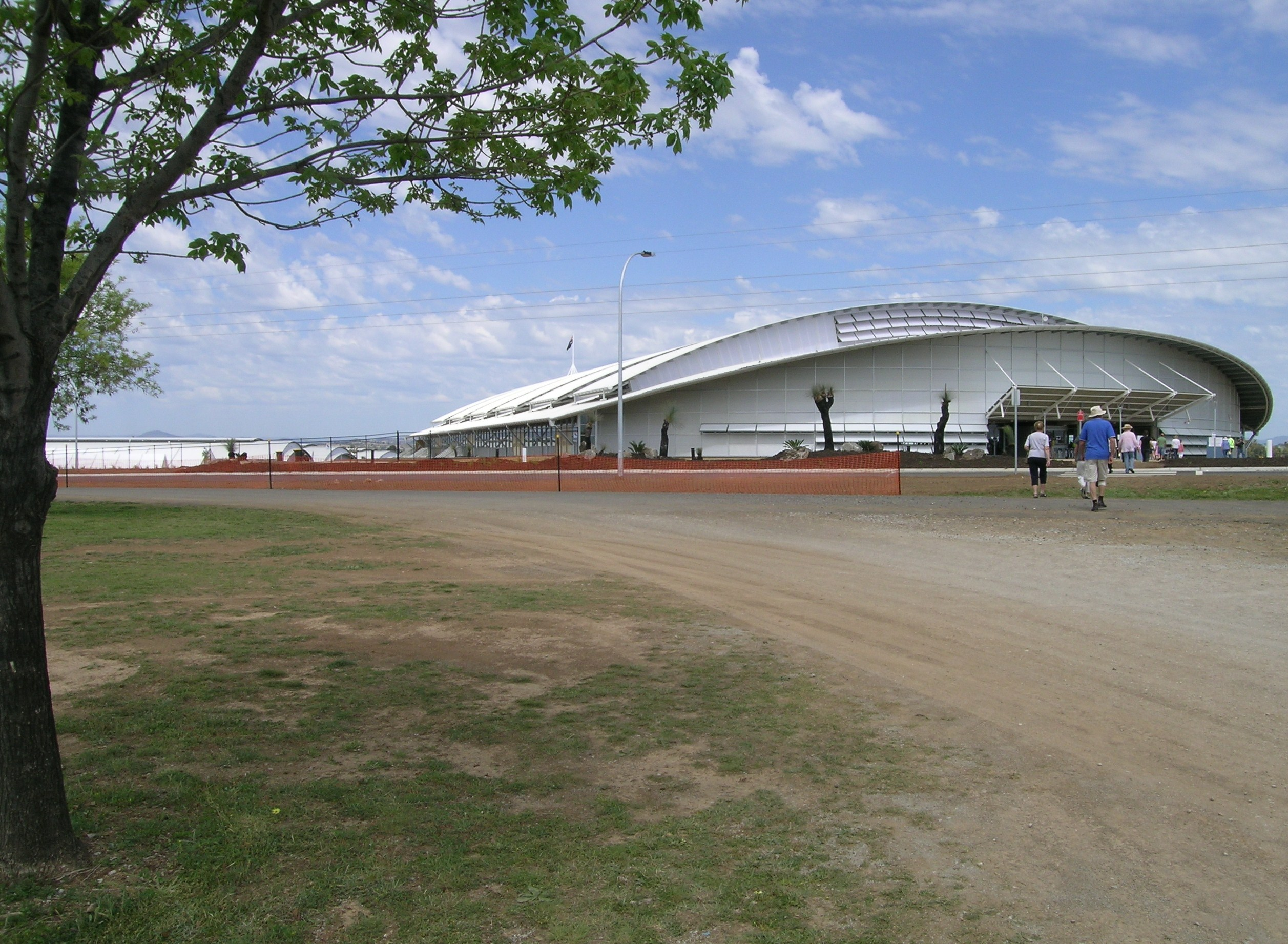
- Interactive map of Australian Equine and Livestock Events Centre
- Location: New England Highway, Tamworth, New South Wales
- Coordinates: 31°8′5″S 150°55′18″E
- Owner: Tamworth Regional Council
- Operator: Tamworth Regional Council
- Capacity: Total: 4,020

Construction
- Groundbreaking: June 2007
- Opened: 2008
- Cost: A$30 million
- Architects: Timothy Court & Company

Website
- Official website

The Australian Equine and Livestock Events Centre (AELEC) is a multi building and arena complex that was designed for equine usage. It has two indoor arenas, stabling, plus an education and training building, which is located on the New England Highway approximately five kilometres south of the Tamworth Central Business District in the suburb of Hillvue.

The centre, designed by architects Timothy Court and Company and built by National Buildplan presents a landmark for New England Highway traffic. This complex is a multi-level, multipurpose livestock centre with a total seating capacity of 4,020 and is the biggest of its kind in the Southern Hemisphere. AELEC can be used in its entirety or parts thereof depending on the participants’ requirements.

Tamworth is recognised as the "National Equine Capital of Australia" because of the high volume of equine events held in the city, the presence of several equine organisation offices and many nearby breeding and training establishments.

== History ==
The New South Wales Government approved the Tamworth Regional Council business plan in May 2007 that provided for the centre’s construction. TRC contributed A$20 million with council cash, loans and reserves. The Australian Federal Government contributed $6.6 million and State government made grants of $3.65 million. Belmore Engineering of Tamworth won the tender worth about $350,000 for the cattle yard roofing and the campdrafting judge's tower.

Work commenced on the 22 ha site in June 2007 by the National Buildplan Group of Armidale who won the tender to build it. This centre is the biggest ever construction undertaken by Tamworth Regional Council on behalf of its city and community and is a significant landmark there.

The main arena, domed sale ring and six stable buildings incorporate unique, post-tensioned steel truss technology designed by the project's Sydney based structural engineer S2 Corporation, is believed to be a first for equine centres on the world.

The complex was opened to the public on Sunday 21 September 2008 as part of a community open day from 12 noon to 5 pm. About 8,000 to 9,000 people from across the state visited the centre.

Additional seating is planned for up to 1,500 more on the mezzanine level in Stage II. Stabling will be increased to 700 stalls in stage II. The stadium will be extended to include a restaurant and an exhibition hall for a heritage hall of fame. This will be the future site for the annual Tamworth Pastoral & Agricultural Show.

On 23 October 2008 the NSW Chapter of the Australian Property Institute voted the Australian Equine and Livestock Events Centre as the leading local government project in New South Wales (NSW) in this year.

The 2010 Professional Bull Riders (PBR) Finals were held over two nights at the Australian Equine and Livestock Events Centre, with five top-ranked professional bull riders from the United States and 25 of Australia’s best bull riders contesting the event.

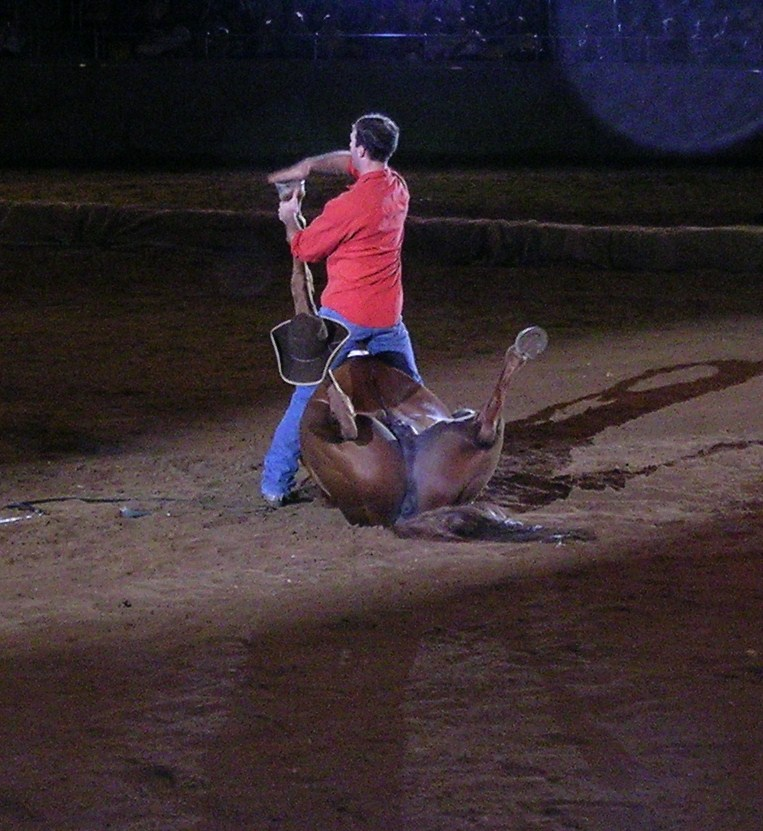
"The Drunk" (played by Dan James) and his well trained stallion

== Official opening ==
On 21 February 2009 the Australian Equine and Livestock Events Centre was officially opened by the NSW Governor, Marie Bashir, before a sell-out crowd of almost 3,500 people. Professor Bashir commented that the complex takes your breath away and Tony Windsor, Independent MP for New England, stated that AELEC could be compared to the Sydney Opera House. The audience was entertained by top performances of skill during the opening night. The Gomeroi Dance Troupe performed along with Mark Atkins playing his didgeridoo. Colin Friels recited "The Man from Snowy River", while a mob of 20 horses and stockmen galloped around the arena with their stockwhips cracking. Other performances included a display by pony club members of the 30 Zone area. The charge of Beersheba was re-created by 52 members of Light Horse troops from NSW and Queensland. A troop of 12 horsemen appeared as the Electric Horsemen to give an unusual light display. Heath and Rozzie Ryan gave dressage displays with their stallions and a liberty horse. Six of Australia's best horse riding stunts riders performed, including a blindfolded girl who made a circuit of the arena, without a lunge rein. Dan James then showed the audience, in his acts, why he is the 2008 Australian Horseman of the Year.

== General information ==
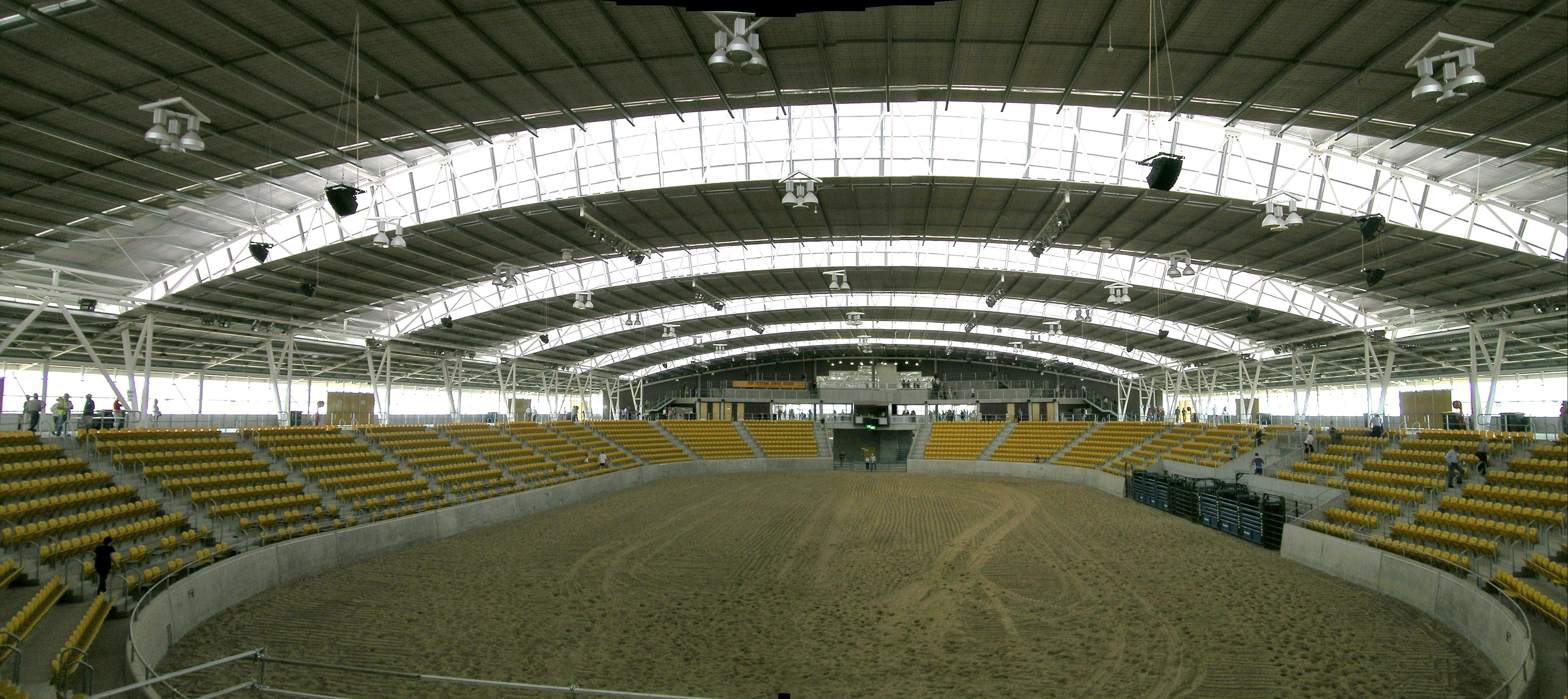
The 40m x 80m AELEC indoor arena, Tamworth, NSW

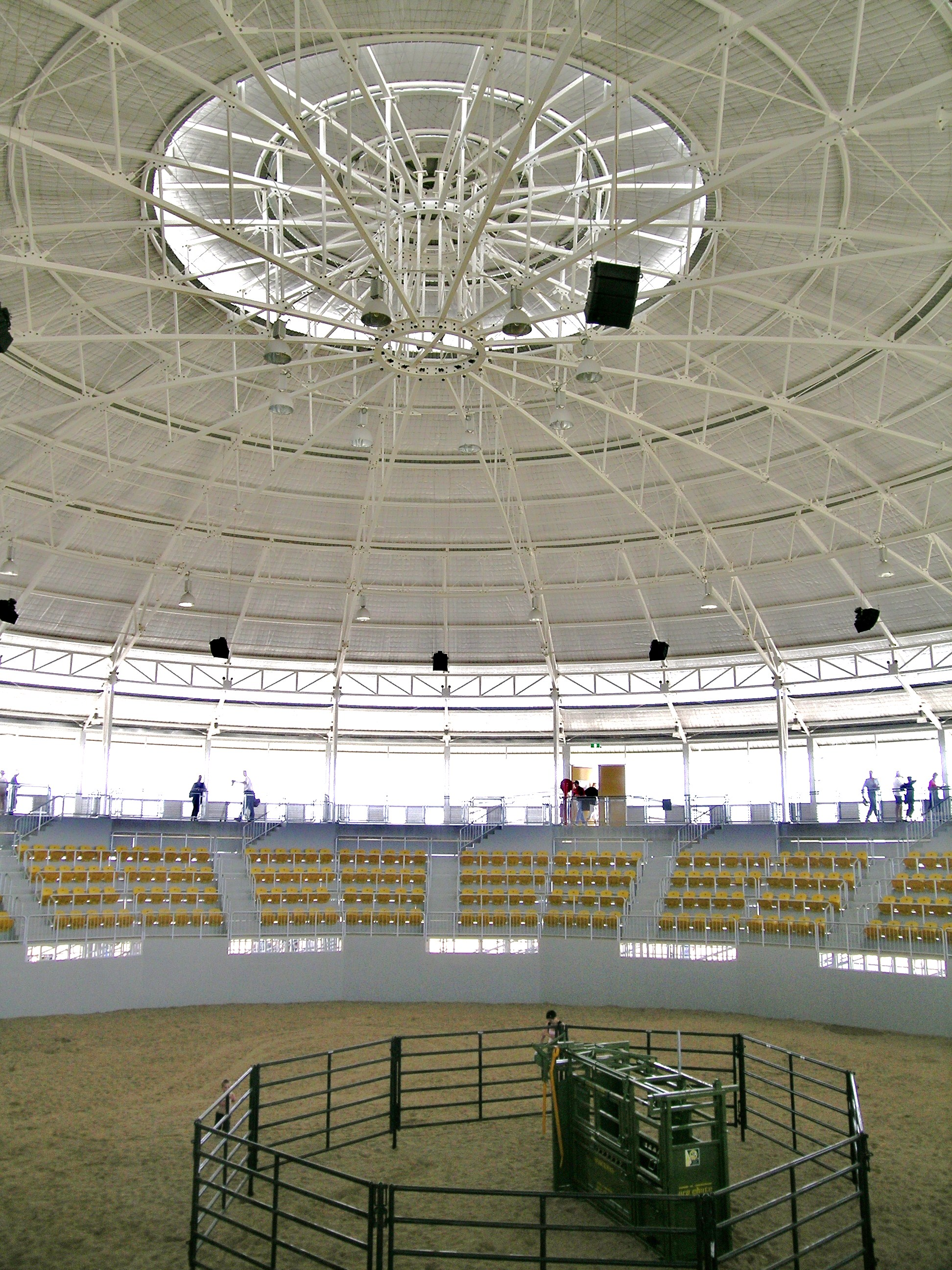
Sale ring, AELEC, Tamworth, New South Wales

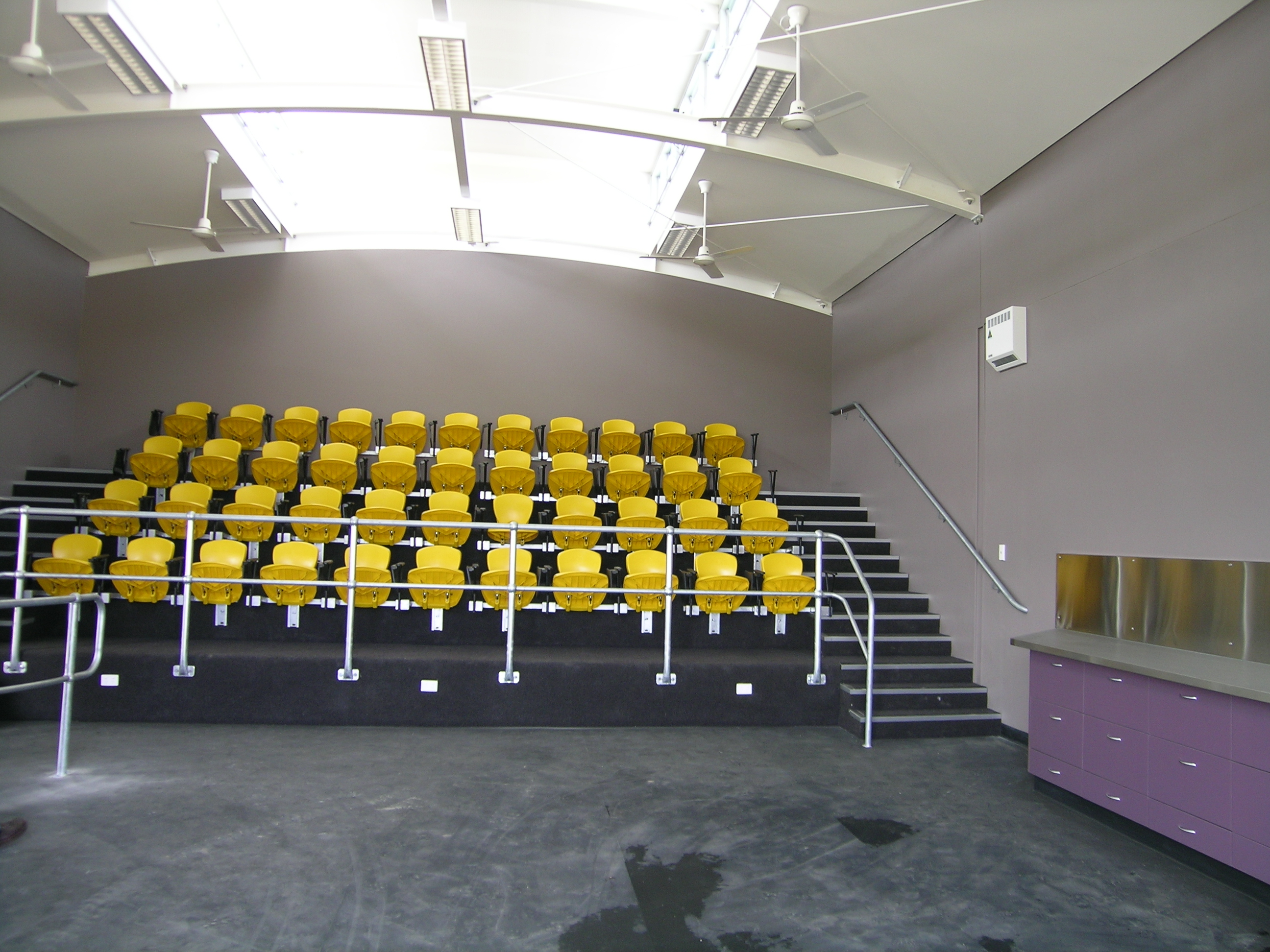
The lecture theatre

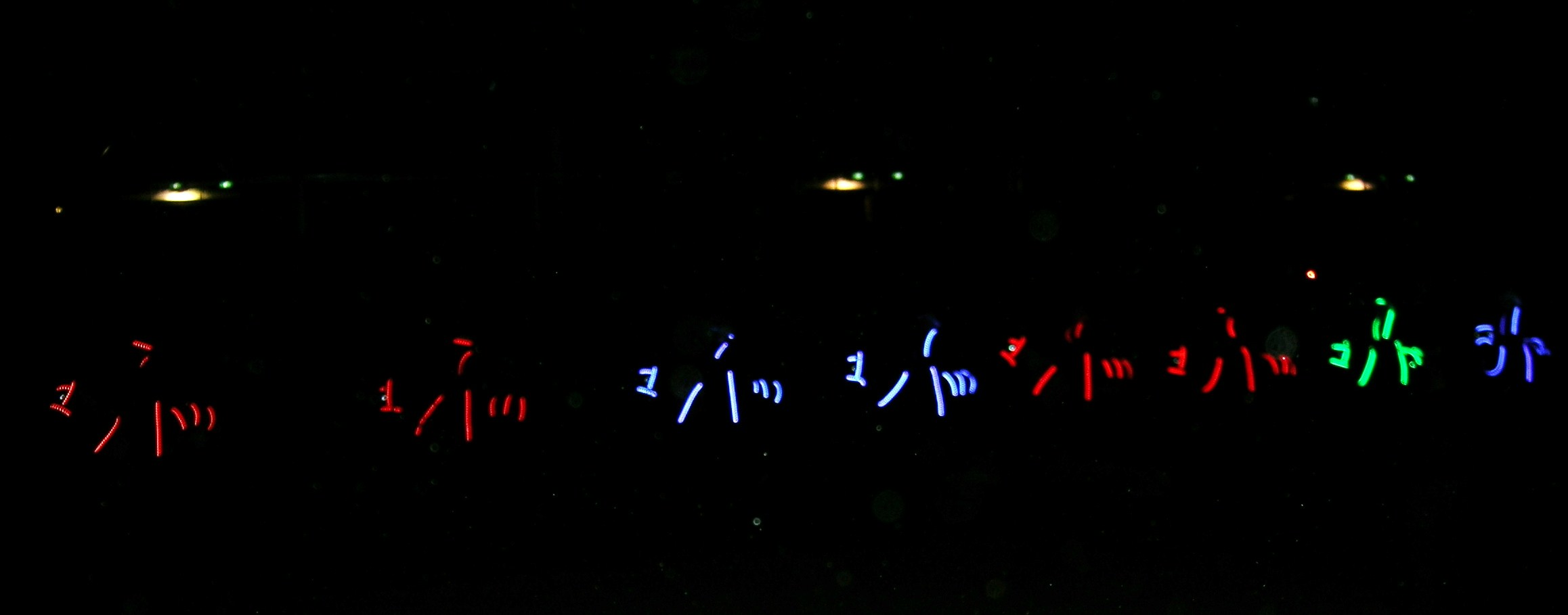
Some of the Electric Horsemen at the official opening.

The site is more than 72 hectares in total. Over 300 trees have been planted and even more shrubs have been installed. The perimeter of the complex is in the shape of a horseshoe.

Over 1,000 workers were employed on the project with up to 100 working on the site on some days.

== Some of the facilities include ==
- 478 stables in six blocks with wash bays – box stalls approximately 3.6 metres by 3.6 metres in size. The two stable blocks located near the sale centre can be converted into cattle pavilions for stud or led cattle.
- Sale centre with theatre-style seating for 660, standing room for 400. This can double as a covered warm up area.
- Indoor Arena – 40 metres x 80 metres with rough riding chutes with seating for 3,360 with corporate sections
- 100m x 100m outdoor arena with specialised "Ebb & Flow" surface
- An educational and training building has a lecture theatre with seating for 44 and an area where animals can be brought into the classroom. This block also has a veterinary room, utilities room, meeting room and ablution facilities.
- The 95m x 110m sand campdraft arena and cutout yard was designed by the ABCRA.
- Two 30m by 70m outdoor competition or warm up arenas plus a 60m x 30m arena with "Ebb & Flow" surface.
- 4-Star cross country course.
- Disabled access and parking at both levels and a lift from lower ground level to concourse and VIP area.
- Trade and exhibition concourse area of 50 sites.
- VIP bar and catering on second level overlooking arena and sale centre.
- Viewing screens, sound and lighting systems.
- Air-conditioned event management offices and meeting rooms
- Show jumping and dressage areas
- Undercover cattle handling and holding facilities
- Toilet and showers facilities in stable complex with laundry facilities
- Truck bay and 195 powered camping facilities adjacent to stables

The Tamworth Regional Council has spent more than $1.2 million in extending recycled water for use in the Longyard precinct and harvesting runoff water from the complex buildings.

== Centre uses ==
The biggest event scheduled in 2008 was the nine-day 35th National Cutting Horse Association (NCHA) ANZ Futurity which featured over $500,000 in the prize pool. The first rodeo held in the AELEC was run by the ABCRA.

Other uses for the centre include:

- Australian Stock Horse, Quarter Horse and other horse breed sales and shows
- Campdrafting and team penning.
- Dog agility trials
- Stud livestock shows, sales and seminars
- Educational exhibitions
- Pony club events
- Rodeos
- Rural or industry field days

The bovine and equine industries have strongly supported use of the AELEC complex with bookings for 250 days of the first year of its operation. Alpaca and goat events have also been held, or are scheduled to take place here.
