= Tamworth railway station, New South Wales =

Railway station in New South Wales, Australia

Tamworth
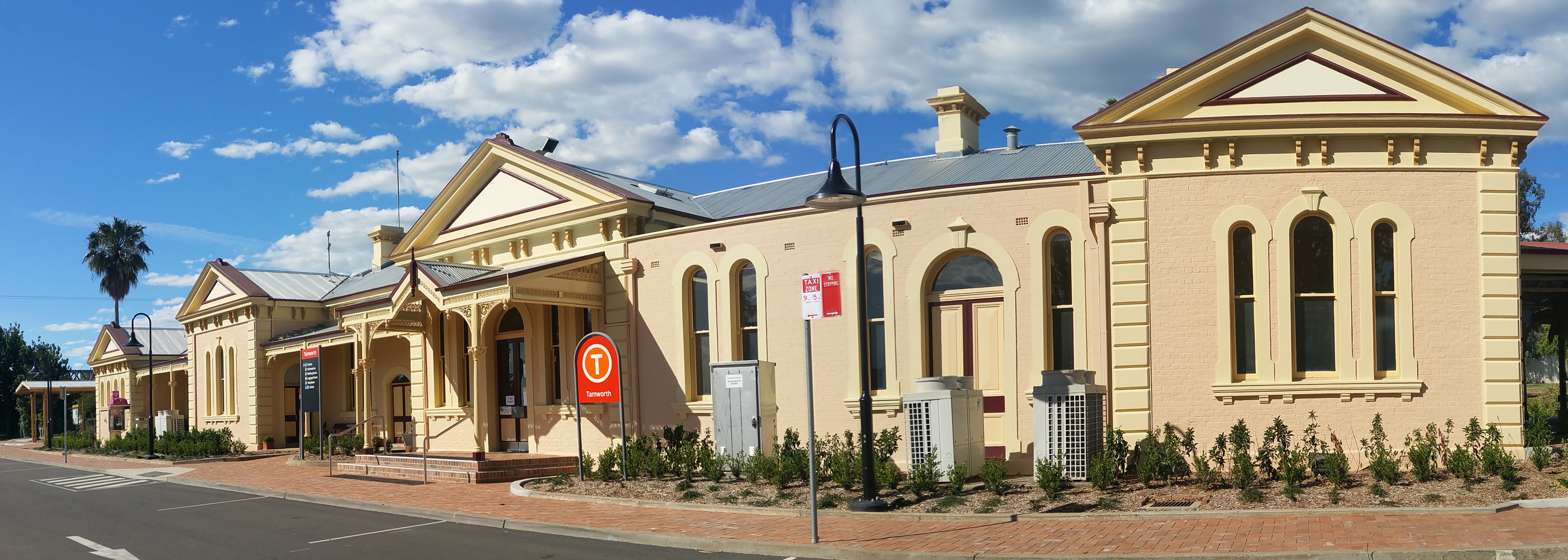
- Station front in November 2017

General information
- Location: Marius Street, Tamworth; Australia
- Coordinates: 31°05′14″S 150°55′51″E
- Owner: Transport Asset Manager of New South Wales
- Operator: NSW TrainLink
- Line: Main Northern
- Distance: 455.1 km (282.8 mi) from Central
- Platforms: 1
- Tracks: 1

Construction
- Structure type: Ground
- Accessible: Yes

Other information
- Status: Weekdays: Staffed: 8.30am–4.30pm: Weekends and public holidays: Staffed: 8.30am–4.30pm
- Station code: TMW

History
- Opened: 9 January 1882

Services
Preceding station	NSW TrainLink	Following station
Kootingal towards Armidale	NSW TrainLink North Western Line	Werris Creek towards Sydney

New South Wales Heritage Register
- Official name: Tamworth Railway Station, yard group and movable relics
- Type: State heritage (complex / group)
- Designated: 2 April 1999
- Reference no.: 1260
- Type: Railway Platform / Station
- Category: Transport – Rail
Location
- Location within New South Wales

Tamworth railway station is a heritage-listed railway station located on the Main Northern line in Tamworth, New South Wales, Australia. It serves the city of Tamworth, and opened on 9 January 1882 when the line was extended from West Tamworth to Kootingal. It is also known as the Tamworth Railway Station, yard group and movable relics. The property was added to the New South Wales State Heritage Register on 2 April 1999.

The station has one platform with a disused dock platform at the southern end that was formerly used by the Barraba line railmotor service.

== Services ==
Tamworth station is served by NSW TrainLink's daily Northern Tablelands Xplorer service operating between Armidale and Sydney. NSW TrainLink also operate a coach service from the station to Inverell Wednesday to Monday.

Platform	Line	Stopping pattern	Notes
1	North Western Region	services to Sydney Central & Armidale	

=== Transport links ===
NSW TrainLink operates coach services to Dubbo and Port Macquarie.

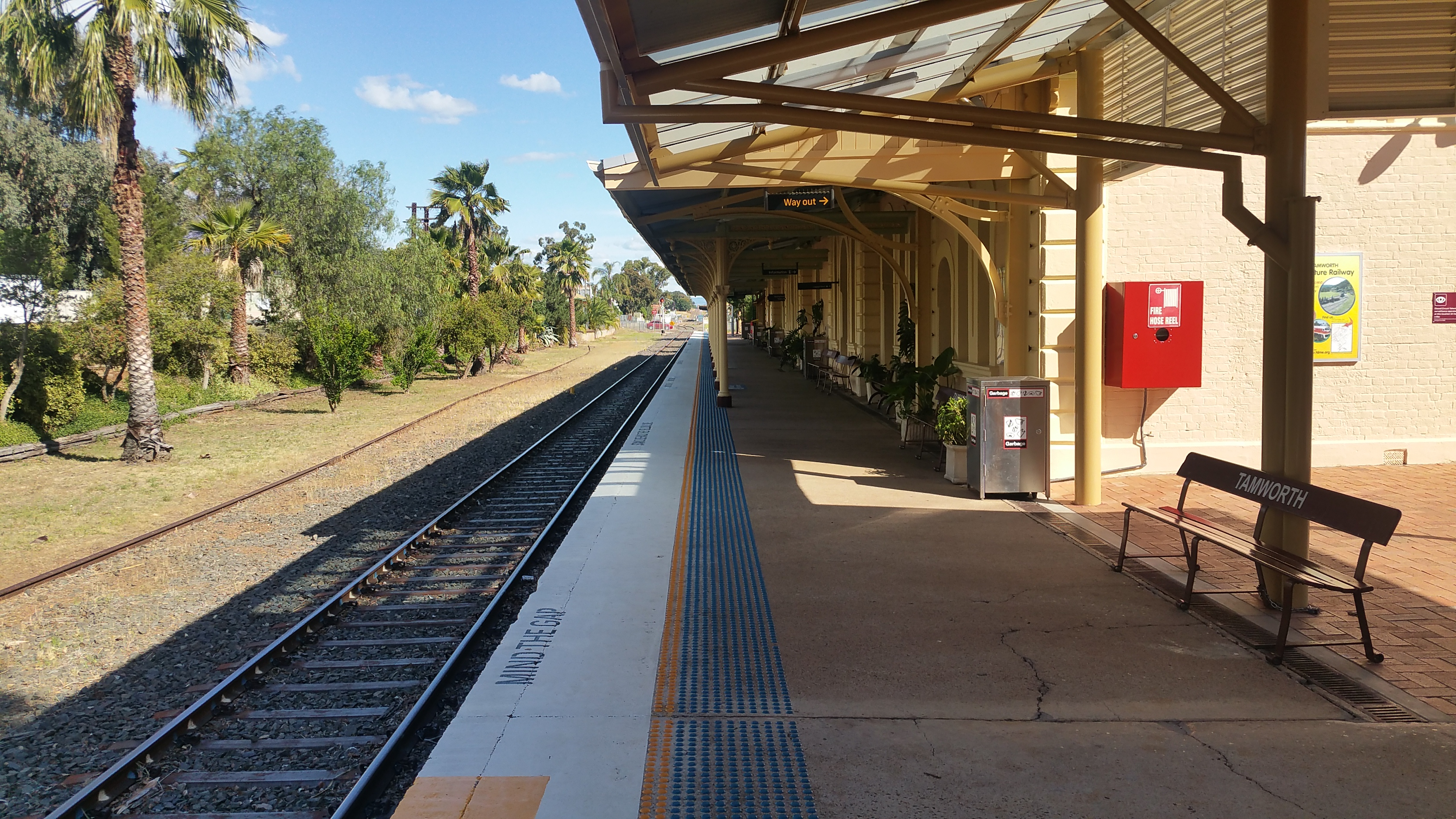
Looking south on the platform

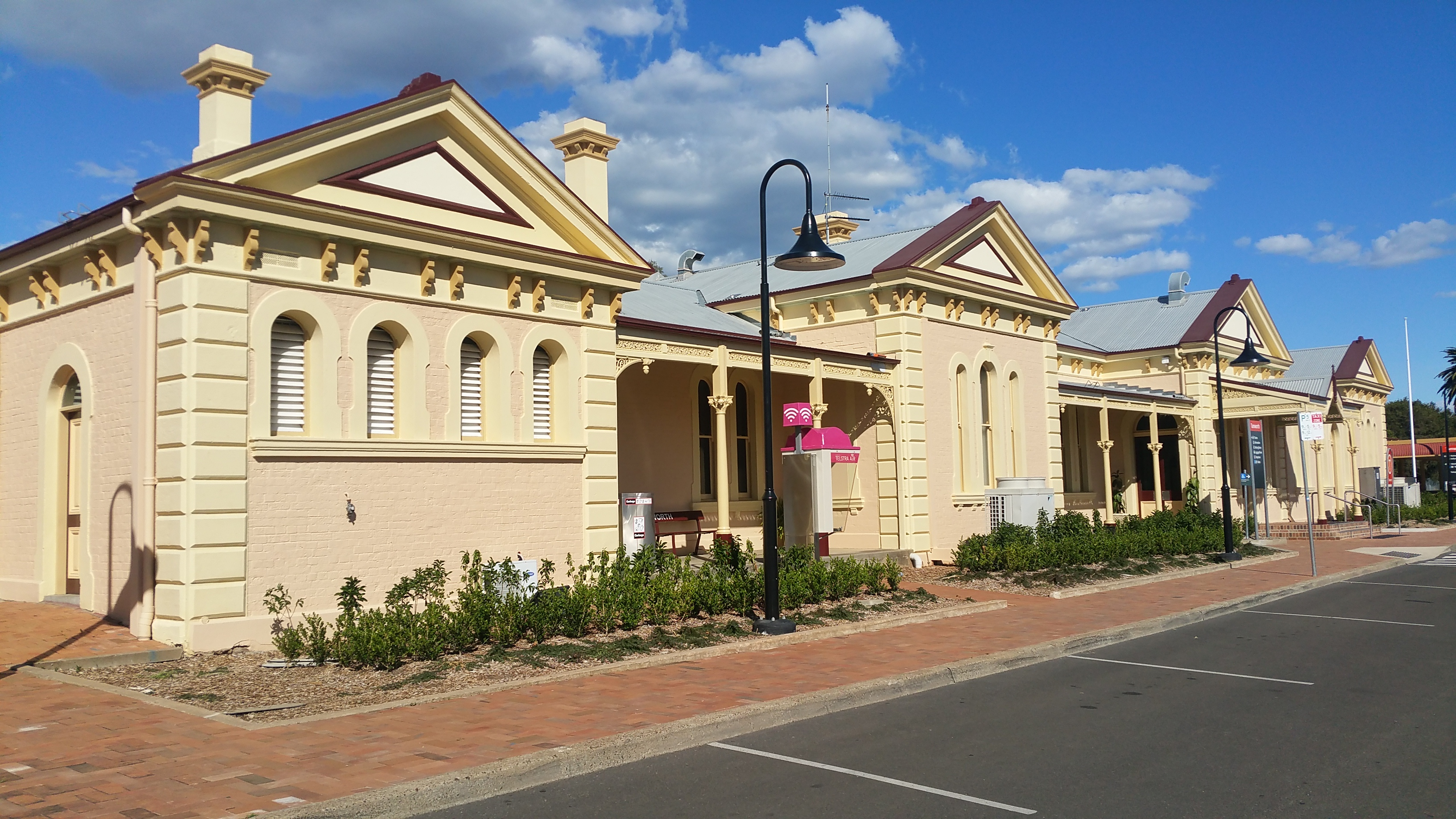
Station building

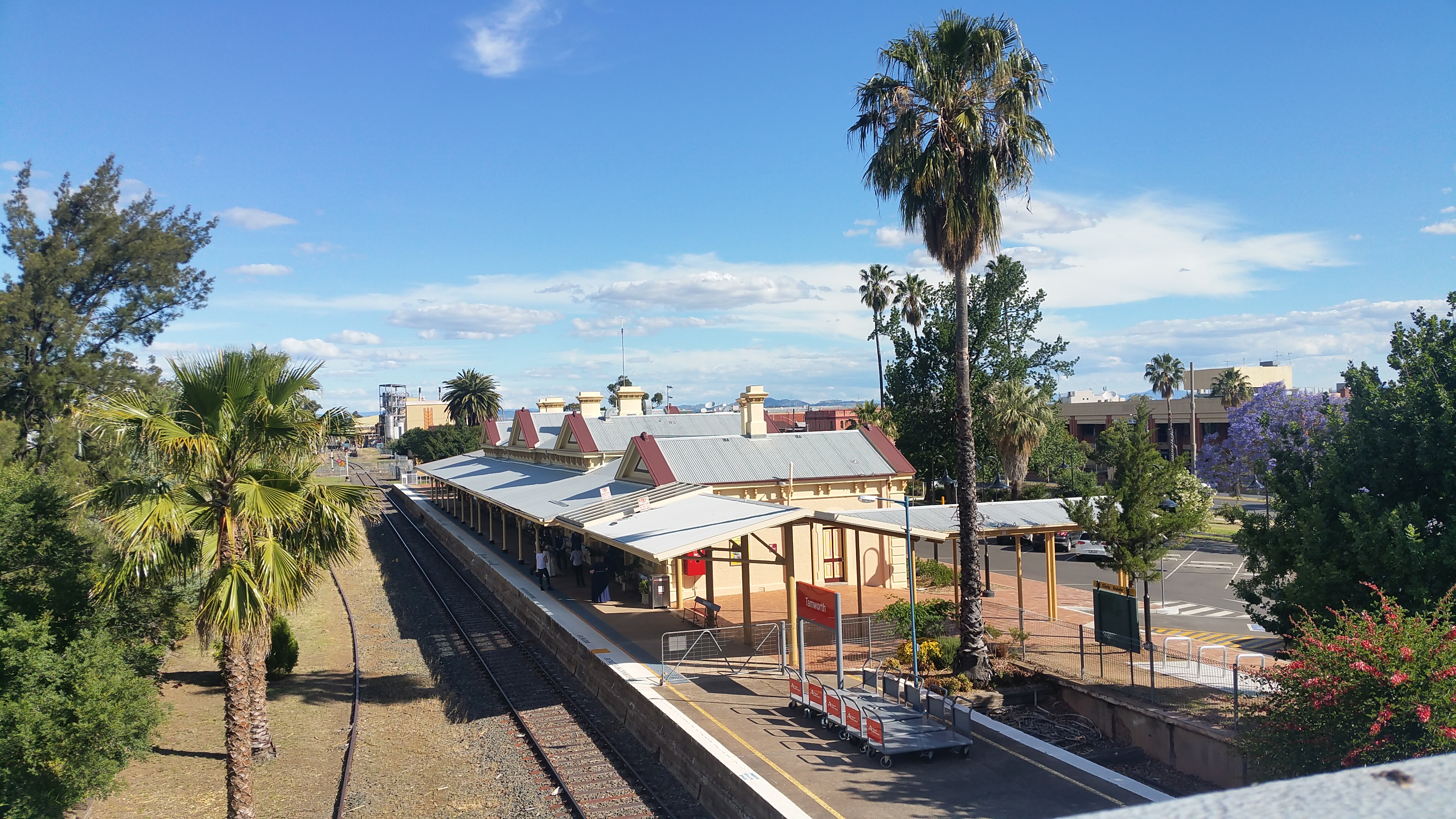
View of station from footbridge

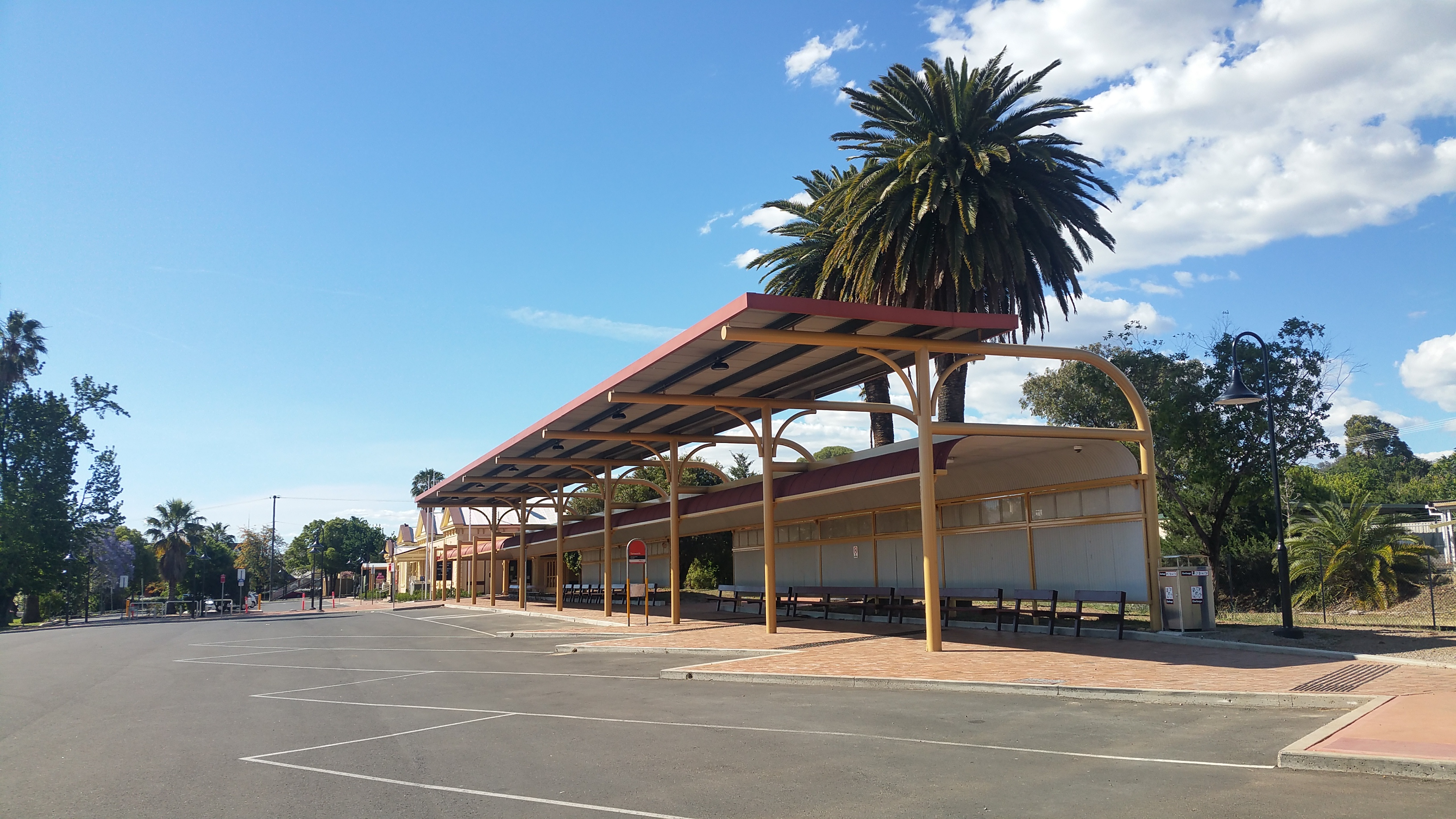
Bus Terminal outside station

== History ==
Tamworth railway precinct is located on the Main North line, running from Sydney and extending north to the Queensland border, at the town of Wallangarra. The Main North Line (also known as the Great Northern Railway) runs through the Central Coast, Hunter and the New England regions. The line was the original main line between Sydney and Brisbane, however this required a change of gauge at Wallangarra. The line is now closed north of Armidale, and the main route between Brisbane and Sydney is now the North Coast line.

Tamworth is located in the east of the region of the Liverpool Plains of NSW. Explorer John Oxley passed through the Peel Valley in 1818. In 1831, the first sheep stations and cattle stations were formed with most of the country subdivided into large runs by the mid-19th century. The region was used predominantly by pastoralists for cattle and sheep grazing, although the 20th century saw sheep and wheat farming dominate the region.

In the 1830s, a company town began to develop on the Peel's southwest bank, the present site of West Tamworth. In 1850 a public town was gazetted on the opposite side of the river from the existing settlement. This town became the main town, called Tamworth. The town grew and, in 1861, Tamworth had a population of 654, both in the government town on the north side of the river, and in the company town on the south side. A municipality was created in 1876, when Tamworth had flour mills, a tannery, butter factory, plaster works, brick and pipe-making, brewery, clothing and furniture manufacture. Its services included a hospital, post office and telegraph, court house, police station, two schools, two banks and six insurance brokers. In 1888, Tamworth was the first Australian town to use electric lighting.

The Great Northern Railway had reached East Maitland in 1857, Singleton in 1863, Muswellbrook in 1869 and Murrurundi in April 1871. Coaches ran from there to Tamworth and other New England areas. The opening of the Quirindi section took place on 13 August 1877 with the line reaching Tamworth in 1878. The official opening of the railway platform at West Tamworth took place on 15 October 1878. The Tamworth railway station at West Tamworth was only named West Tamworth after the line was extended across the river to East Tamworth and the opening of the present Tamworth railway station in 1882.

The single line from West Tamworth to Kootingal opened on 9 January 1882, with the station officially opened for service on the same day. The construction contract for the West Tamworth to Uralla section was awarded to A & R Amos on 12 September 1879.

The two towns of Tamworth prospered as a traffic centre when the railways arrived in 1878, as it drew much of the northern wool traffic by dray to the rail head. As each new section of the Main North line was opened, the settlement at the temporary terminus suddenly became a busy centre as horse or bullock teams carried supplies from the railway yard to all the settlements beyond and returned with wool, minerals and other produce. Generally, the arrival of railway gangs to extend the line to the next town provided a final flutter before the town returned to slumber. Tamworth, however, was one of few larger towns to receive a sustainable boost from the arrival of the railway.

The uniquely designed 1880s station building featured fine classical Victorian proportions and good detailing and finish. Internally, the building originally consisted of a central waiting room, station master's, ticket, parcels, and telegraph offices, ladies waiting room, and detached toilet block and lamp room wing. Although the station building has been added to, as is evident on the platform awning, and the use and composition of rooms has changed over the years, the building remains in close to original condition. The station building also incorporated the very rare addition of a landscaped forecourt, with many of the original plantings surviving to the present day.

The station master's residence is unique in that it was purchased after its construction, and therefore does not conform to the typical railway structures from this period. It was built in 1877 as the manse for the nearby Wesleyan Church and was separated from the church by the construction of the railway when it was extended from Tamworth in 1881. This coincides with the purchase of the property by NSW Railways to serve as the station masters residence.

== Description ==
The interior of Tamworth signal box, 2009

The station complex comprises a first class type 5 station building, erected in 1882; and residences located at 34 Bourke Street, being a type 4 Station Master's residence, erected in 1877 and resumed in 1881, and a type 3 brick gatehouse, erected in 1882. Other structures include a brick/concrete platform face and dock platform, erected in 1882; a footbridge, undated; and timber level crossing gates and gatehouses at the Sydney end of the loop.

The complex is landscaped with a park and plantings in the forecourt area, established c. 1880, including trees from opening of the station.

Moveable objects at the signal box complex include a platform lamp oil, (AA01); three cane hoops, two large, one small; a collected tickets box (AA13); compactus in the training room; a sign, pillows for hire 1/-, 0.5/0.5, (AS01); a circuit phone wall mounted timber, (AT01); a timber rotating chair with leather cushion and central cut-out, (CA03); and a timber table and ruling rod, 0.9/0.7/0.8, (TA01).

== Heritage listing ==
As at 4 September 2013, the Tamworth Railway Station was of state significance as a grand Victorian period station complex, in close to original condition with the very rare addition of a landscaped forecourt area dating from the time of construction and containing original planting and civic garden detail. The station building is an excellent example of a first-class station building with fine classical proportions, good detailing and finish, demonstrating the peak of railway construction during the late 19th century. The station building is significant as a tangible link to the development of the Great Northern Railway (GNR) line during the 19th century, with the scale and quality of building design demonstrating the importance that was attached to Tamworth as a township and railway location.

Tamworth railway station was listed on the New South Wales State Heritage Register on 2 April 1999 having satisfied the following criteria.

The place is important in demonstrating the course, or pattern, of cultural or natural history in New South Wales.

The Tamworth railway precinct is significant for its historical values as a tangible link to the development of the Great Northern Railway (GNR) line during the 19th century. The GNR was an important achievement in transport and engineering within NSW. As the third main trunk rail route in NSW stretching from Sydney to the Queensland border, the line linked townships to one another as well as to Sydney leading to significant economic and social impacts for those individual townships as well as for NSW more generally. The development, importance and impact of the NSW railways is illustrated at Tamworth through the fine and intact example of a first class railway station, constructed in the 1880s as the rail head at the height of railway construction activity and development in NSW.

The place is important in demonstrating aesthetic characteristics and/or a high degree of creative or technical achievement in New South Wales.

Tamworth railway station building has high aesthetic significance as a unique and finely detailed first class station contributing to the townscape of Tamworth, which is further enhanced by the forecourt area and gardens. The building is a first class, single storey, rendered brick building of Victorian Italianate design. The building consists of painted face brick with stuccoed quoins, pediments, gables, and rendered window and door cornices and sills. The road facade is composed of three classical revival pedimented gables projecting from the main platform wing. Unlike other similar scaled buildings Tamworth station building has equal attention to detail and facade treatment on both the platform and road faces.

The place has a strong or special association with a particular community or cultural group in New South Wales for social, cultural or spiritual reasons.

The site is of social significance to the local community on account of its lengthy association for providing an important source of employment, trade and social interaction for the local area. The site is significant for its ability to contribute to the local community's sense of place, is a distinctive feature of the daily life of many community members, and provides a connection to the local community's past.

The place has potential to yield information that will contribute to an understanding of the cultural or natural history of New South Wales.

The station building, residences and other precinct elements provide an opportunity to research the development of the NSW railways and the role and importance of Tamworth.

The place is important in demonstrating the principal characteristics of a class of cultural or natural places/environments in New South Wales.

The Tamworth railway station building has representative significance as a fine and intact example of a first class railway station building in NSW. Although each of the 19 first class station buildings constructed in NSW differed in design, each demonstrate in scale, quality and decorative detail the importance of the railways and the importance of these stations constructed at major regional centres throughout NSW.

== In popular culture ==
Tamworth station appeared in the 1971 Australian film 3 to Go, as part of the Judy vignette.

== See also ==
- List of regional railway stations in New South Wales
