= KNG =

KNG could refer to:

- Kaimana Airport, Papua, Indonesia, IATA code
- Kingman (Amtrak station), Arizona, US, Amtrak station code
- Kingston railway station (England), London, National Rail station code
- Koongo language, ISO 639-3 code
- Kootingal railway station, New South Wales, Australia, station code
