= Kootingal railway station =

Railway station in New South Wales, Australia

Kootingal
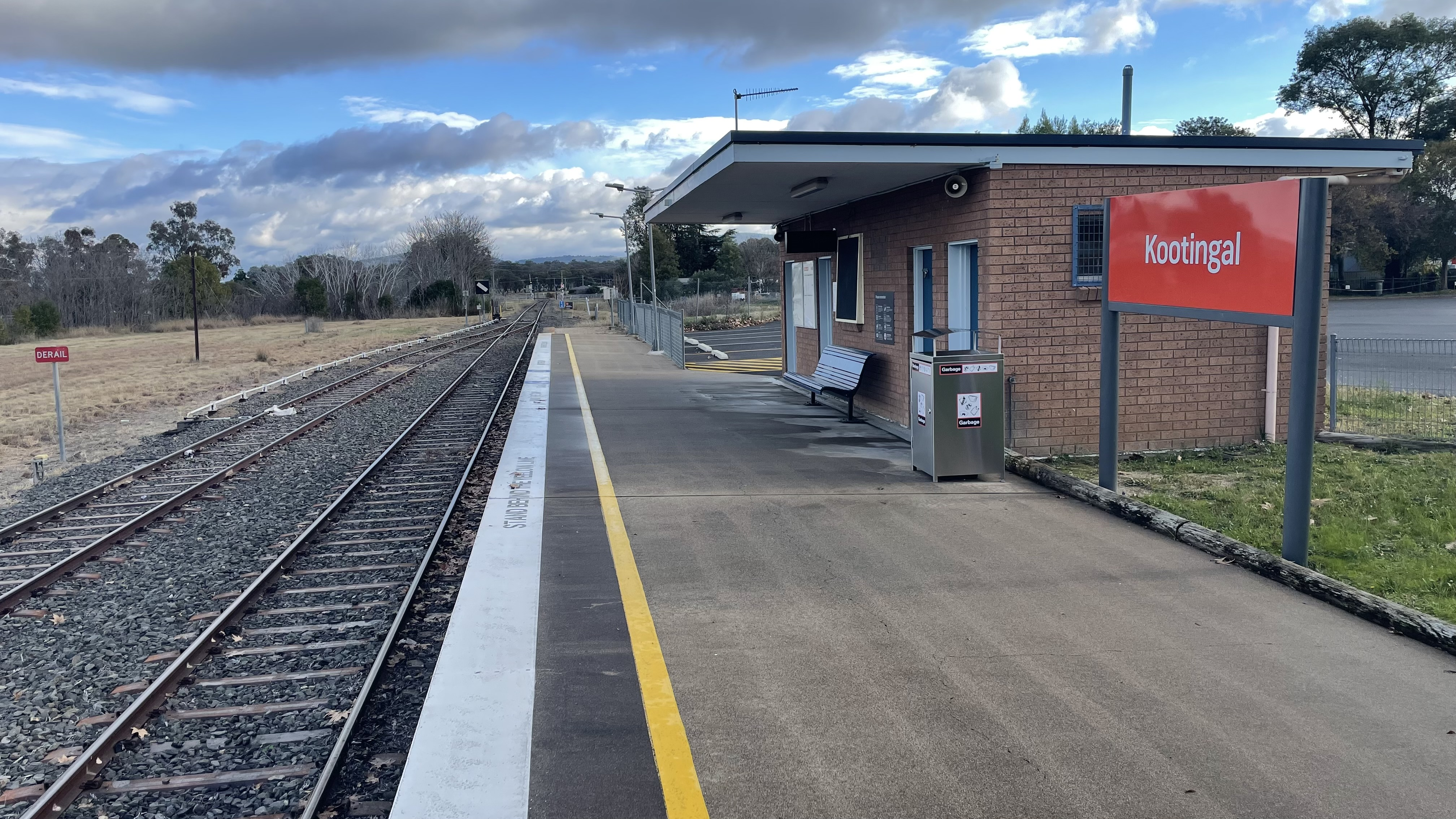
- Southbound view in June 2024

General information
- Location: Station Street, Kootingal; Australia
- Coordinates: 31°03′31″S 150°03′22″E
- Owner: Transport Asset Manager of New South Wales
- Operator: NSW TrainLink
- Line: Main Northern
- Distance: 472.10 kilometres (293.35 mi) from Central
- Platforms: 1
- Tracks: 2

Construction
- Structure type: Ground
- Accessible: Yes

Other information
- Station code: KNG

History
- Opened: 9 January 1882
- Former names: Moonbi (1882–1914)

Services
Preceding station	NSW TrainLink	Following station
Walcha Road towards Armidale	NSW TrainLink North Western Line	Tamworth towards Sydney
Location

Kootingal railway station is located on the Main Northern line in New South Wales, Australia. It serves the town of Kootingal, opening on 9 January 1882 as Moonbi when the line was extended from West Tamworth. It was the terminus of the line until it was extended to Uralla on 2 August 1882. It was renamed Kootingal on 20 April 1914. Opposite the station lies a passing loop.

== Services ==
Kootingal station is served by NSW TrainLink's daily Northern Tablelands Xplorer service operating between Armidale and Sydney.

Platform	Line	Stopping pattern	Notes
1	North Western Region	services to Sydney Central & Armidale	

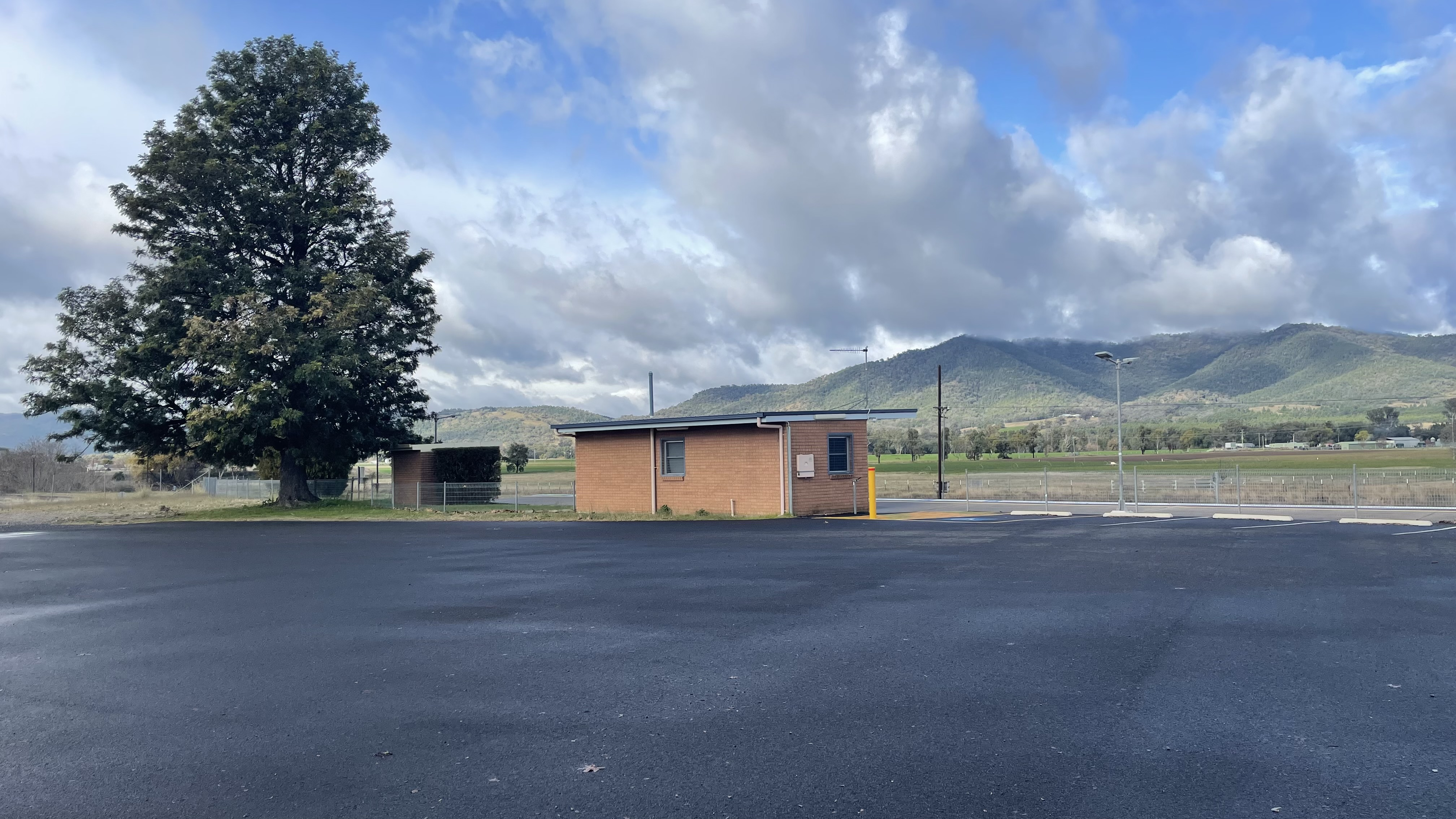
Station entrance

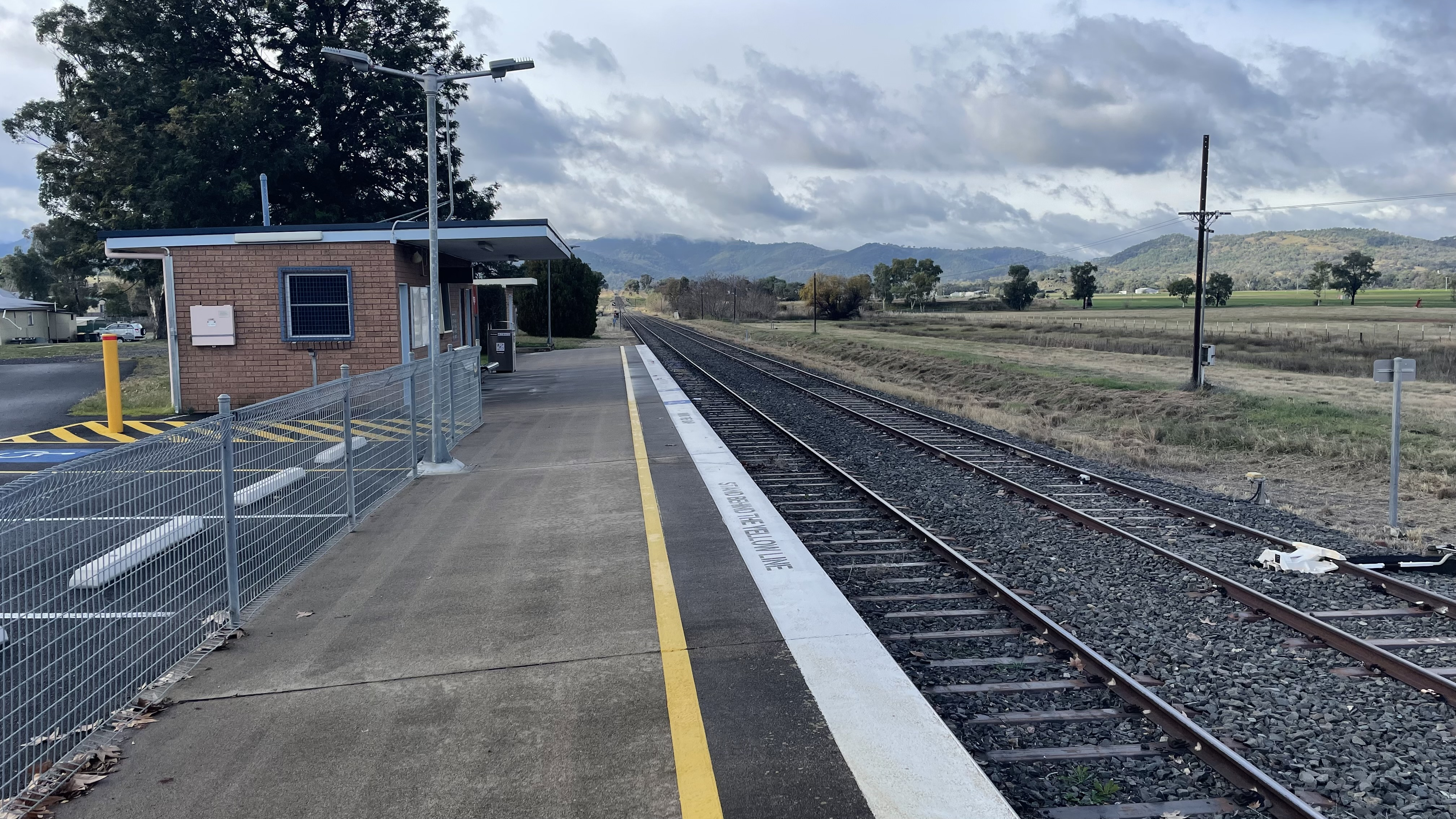
Northbound view on the platform
