= Uralla railway station =

Railway station in New South Wales, Australia

Uralla
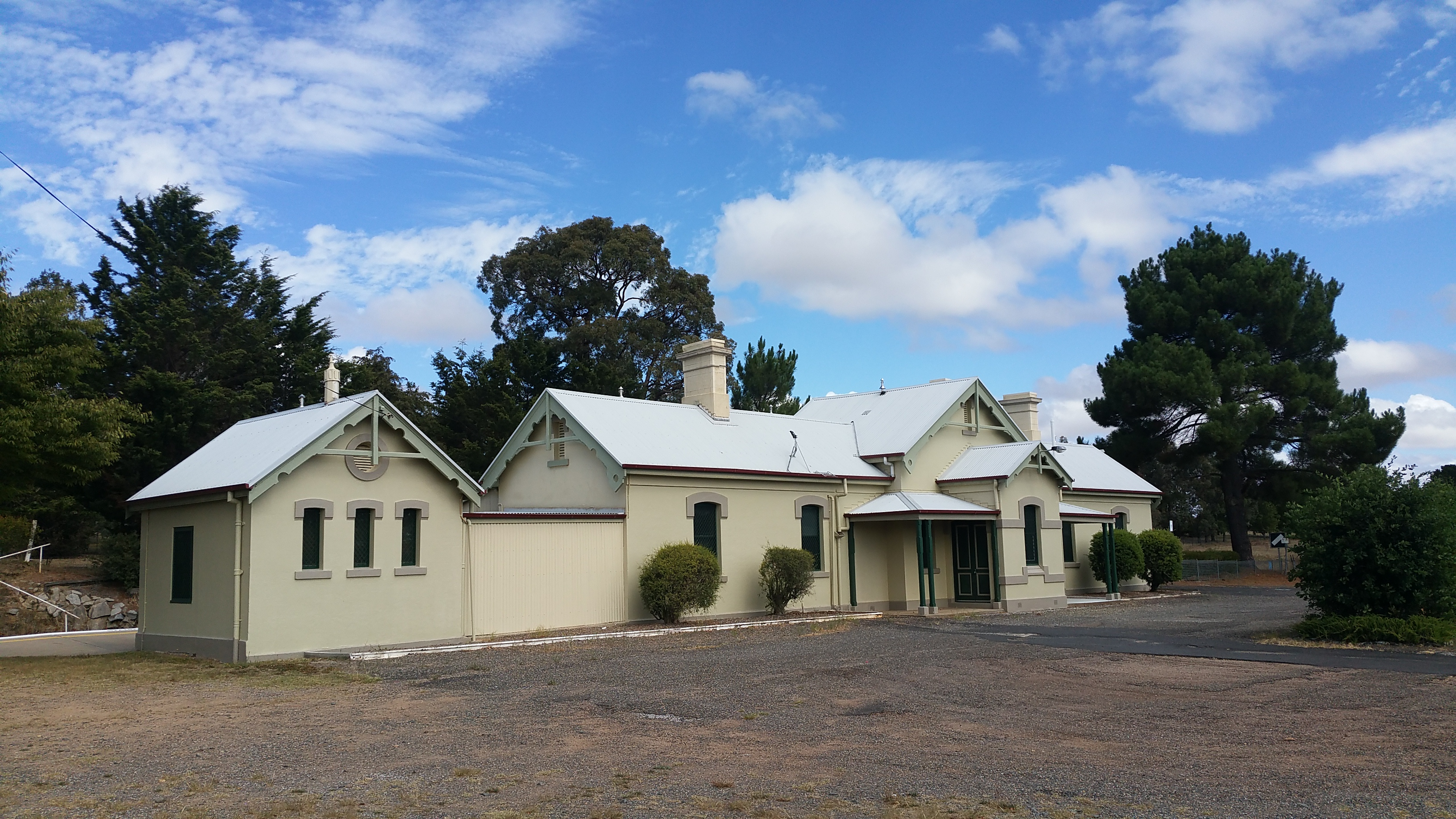
- Station building in March 2019

General information
- Location: Duke Street, Uralla; Australia
- Coordinates: 30°38′38″S 151°30′18″E
- Owner: Transport Asset Manager of New South Wales
- Operator: NSW TrainLink
- Line: Main Northern
- Distance: 555.10 km (344.92 mi) from Central
- Platforms: 1
- Tracks: 2

Construction
- Structure type: Ground
- Accessible: Yes

Other information
- Station code: URL

History
- Opened: 2 August 1882

Services
Preceding station	NSW TrainLink	Following station
Armidale Terminus	NSW TrainLink North Western Line	Walcha Road towards Sydney

New South Wales Heritage Register
- Official name: Uralla Railway Station group
- Type: State heritage (complex / group)
- Designated: 2 April 1999
- Reference no.: 1275
- Type: Railway Platform / Station
- Category: Transport – Rail
Location
- Location within New South Wales

Uralla railway station is a heritage-listed railway station located on the Main Northern line in New South Wales, Australia. It serves the town of Uralla, and opened on 2 August 1882 when the line was extended from Kootingal. It was the terminus of the line until it was extended to Armidale on 3 February 1883. It is also known as Uralla Railway Station group. The property was added to the New South Wales State Heritage Register on 2 April 1999.

== Services ==
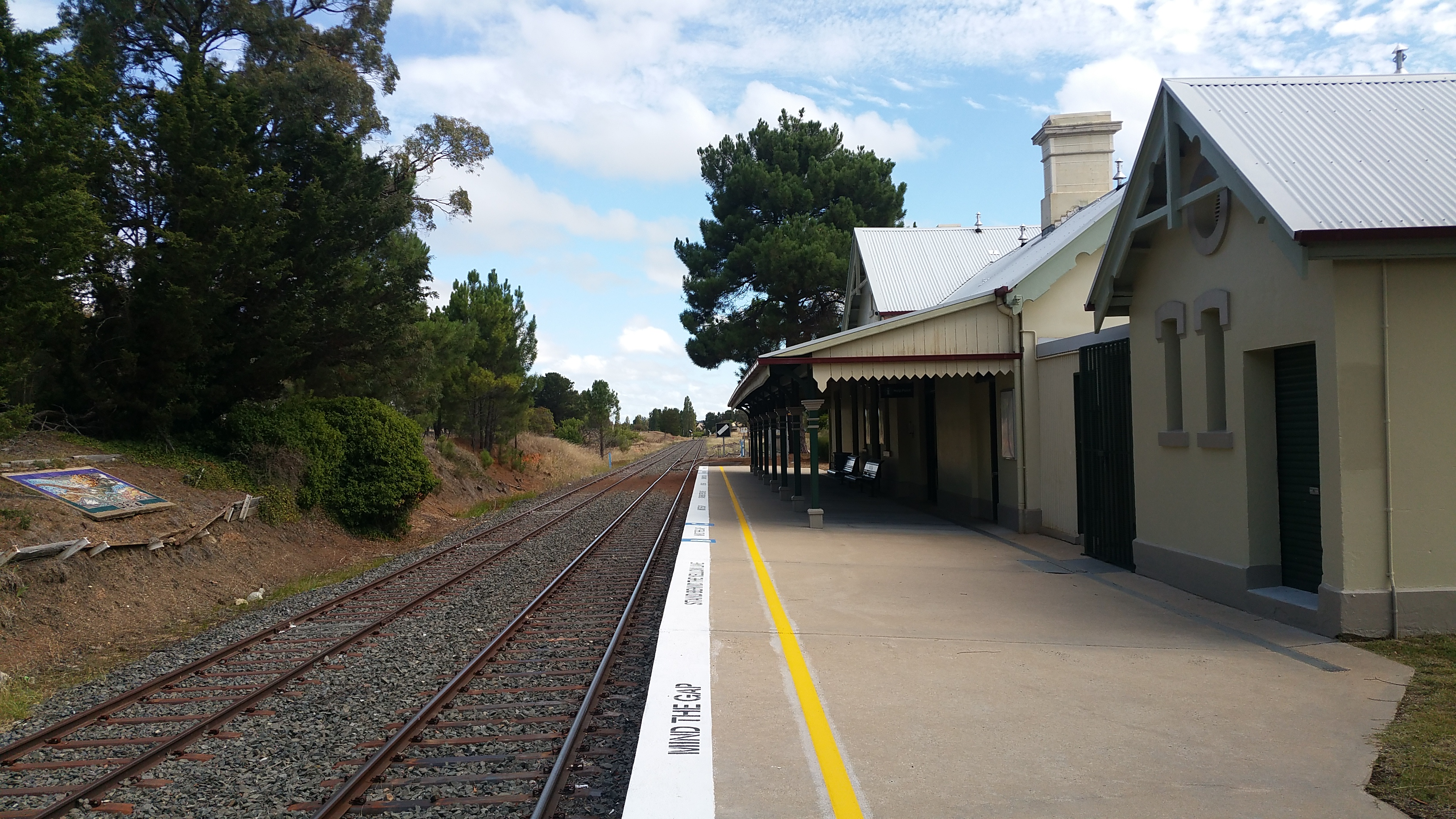
Southbound view on platform

Uralla station is served by NSW TrainLink's daily Northern Tablelands Xplorer service operating between Armidale and Sydney.

Platform	Line	Stopping pattern	Notes
1	North Western Region	services to Sydney Central & Armidale	

== Description ==
The complex includes a type 4 station building, that is standard roadside third class brick, completed in 1883. The platform faces, also made of brick, were completed at the same time.

== Heritage listing ==
As at 22 November 2010, Uralla is part of a group of sites on the Great Northern line of significance and a station and residence of quality and typical of the development on that line. The buildings are significant in the development of the State's railway and to the local community. The gatekeeper's cottage is an example of this early form of residence that was used widely throughout the State, particularly on lines constructed in the 1880s. It illustrates the pattern of development of the railway through country areas.

Uralla railway station was listed on the New South Wales State Heritage Register on 2 April 1999 having satisfied the following criteria.

The place possesses uncommon, rare or endangered aspects of the cultural or natural history of New South Wales.

This item is assessed as historically rare. This item is assessed as scientifically rare. This item is assessed as arch. rare. This item is assessed as socially rare.

== See also ==
- List of regional railway stations in New South Wales
