= Armidale railway station =

Railway station in New South Wales, Australia

Armidale
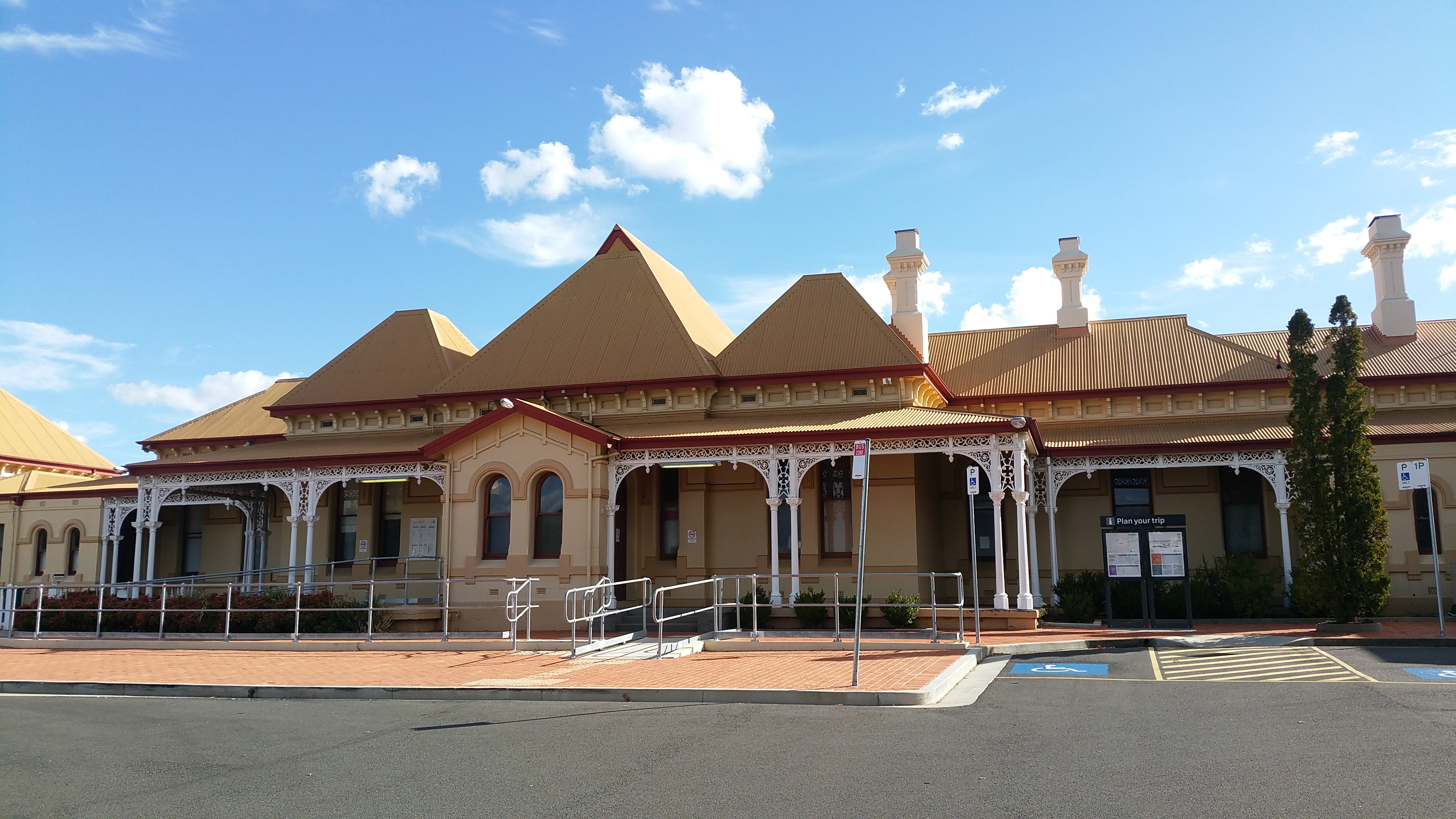
- Station front in March 2019

General information
- Location: 240 Brown Street, Armidale; Australia
- Coordinates: 30°30′55″S 151°39′06″E
- Elevation: 1,000 metres (3,300 ft)
- Owner: Transport Asset Manager of New South Wales
- Operator: NSW TrainLink
- Line: Main North
- Distance: 578.87 km (359.69 mi) from Central
- Platforms: 1
- Tracks: 3

Construction
- Structure type: Ground
- Accessible: Yes

Other information
- Status: Weekdays: Staffed: 7.30am to 11.30am, 1.55pm to 5.55pm: Weekends and public holidays: Unstaffed
- Station code: ARM

History
- Opened: 3 February 1883

Services
Preceding station	NSW TrainLink	Following station
Terminus	NSW TrainLink North Western Line	Uralla towards Sydney
Former services
Preceding station	Former services	Following station
Dumaresq towards Wallangarra	Main Northern Line	Kellys Plains towards Sydney

New South Wales Heritage Register
- Official name: Armidale Railway Station & Stationmaster's residence
- Type: Complex / Group
- Criteria: a., b., c., d., e., g.
- Designated: 2 April 1999
- Reference no.: 01074

New South Wales Heritage Register
- Official name: Armidale Railway Station and yard group movable relics
- Type: Complex / Group
- Designated: 2 April 1999
- Reference no.: 01075

New South Wales Heritage Register
- Official name: Railway Turntable
- Type: Built
- Designated: 2 April 1999
- Reference no.: 01233
Location
- Location within New South Wales

Armidale railway station is a heritage-listed railway station at 240 Brown Street, Armidale, New South Wales, Australia. It was built from 1882 to 1883 by Edmund Lonsdale and Henry Sheldon Hoddard, and was opened on 3 February 1883 when the line was extended from Uralla. It was the terminus of the line until it was extended to Glen Innes on 19 August 1884. It was added to the New South Wales State Heritage Register on 2 April 1999.

It is the terminal station of the Main North line. The last regular services to operate north of Armidale was the Northern Mail which ceased in November 1988. Freight services continued to serve a fertiliser depot at Dumaresq until the mid-2000s, after which the line closed north of Armidale.

== History ==
Armidale railway precinct is located on the Main North line, which runs from Sydney and extends as far as Wallangarra on the Queensland border. The Main North Line (formerly known as the Great Northern Railway) runs through the Central Coast, Hunter and New England regions. The line was the original main line between Sydney and Brisbane, however this required a change of gauge at Wallangarra. The line is now closed north of Armidale, and the main route between Brisbane and Sydney is now the North Coast line.

Armidale was first settled in the early 1830s, following the earlier exploration of the area by John Oxley. Oxley recommended the region for grazing, and soon early pioneers set up small farms in the locality. Armidale, which was surveyed in 1848 and gazetted in 1849, was established to provide a market and administration centre for the farms. The town grew rapidly following the discovery of gold at nearby Rocky River and Gara Gorges in the 1850s.

Although the opening of the Great Northern Railway occurred on 30 March 1857, political indecision in the 1870s hampered efforts by Engineer-in-Chief of the NSW Railways, John Whitton, to finalise the survey of the Great Northern line. Competing proposals urged a route via Armidale and Tenterfield against a less developed but easier route through Barraba and Inverell. On 18 May 1878, the Minister for Public Works, John Sutherland, announced that the chosen route was via Armidale.

The line to Armidale opened on 3 February 1883 as an extension of the line from Uralla and continued on to Glen Innes the following year. The construction contract for the Uralla to Glen Innes section was awarded to David Proudfoot in c. 1882. Contracts for the construction of a station building, Station Master's residence, lamp room, carriage dock and buffer, goods shed, and water tank were awarded in 1882 to Edmund Lonsdale (1843–1913). Lonsdale began his working life as a bricklayer, builder and contractor before beginning a career in state politics (1891–1913), serving as a member for New England and Armidale. The fine cast-iron work of the station building was completed at New England Foundry in Uralla by Henry Sheldon Goddard.

In addition to the station building, other early structures and additions to the yard included the 1882 loco depot, 1891 coal stage, a new 18.288 metre turntable in 1899, extensions to the platform in 1907 and in 1912, and a signal box in 1918.

The loco depot closed in 1984 but Armidale remains an operational railway station with daily NSW TrainLink passenger services.

=== Modifications and dates ===
==== Railway precinct ====
- 1882 – Contract awarded for the construction of engine crew barracks, porters' cottages and gate house;
- 1886 – Tender awarded for construction of refreshment rooms;
- 1907 – Platform at southern end extended;
- 1912 – Platform extended;
- 1913 – Overbridge between Jessie and Dangar Streets opened and Dangar Street level crossing closed;
- 1916 – Refreshment room taken over by the NSWGR;
- 1920 – Institute building authorised;
- 1922 – A subway at Niagara Street provided and level crossing at this street and other crossings at 579.90 km and 583.10 km closed;
- 1926 – A loading bank for loading sheep erected

==== Armidale Depot ====
- 1882 – Contract awarded for provision of a coal stage and pumphouse;
- 1882 – Contract awarded for the construction of 3-track engine shed;
- 1882 – Engine shed opened as a "through type" shed;
- 1891 – Coal stage 18.2m long erected;
- 1899 – An 18.2m diameter turntable provided, replacing the 15.240m diameter unit originally installed;
- 1918 – A 14.1 kW oil engine and shafting in the machine shop installed;
- 1923 – A drop pit and engine pits provided;
- 1923 – Holman hoist erected for coal loading;
- 1923 – Boilermakers shop erected;
- 1926 – Holman coal hoist installed;
- 1926 – 22.8m diameter turntable ordered from Messrs Poole & Steel Ltd.;
- 1945 – 90kL water tank erected;
- 1976 – Diesel locomotive and wagon repair shed and yard modifications;
- 1984 – Depot closed.

== Services ==
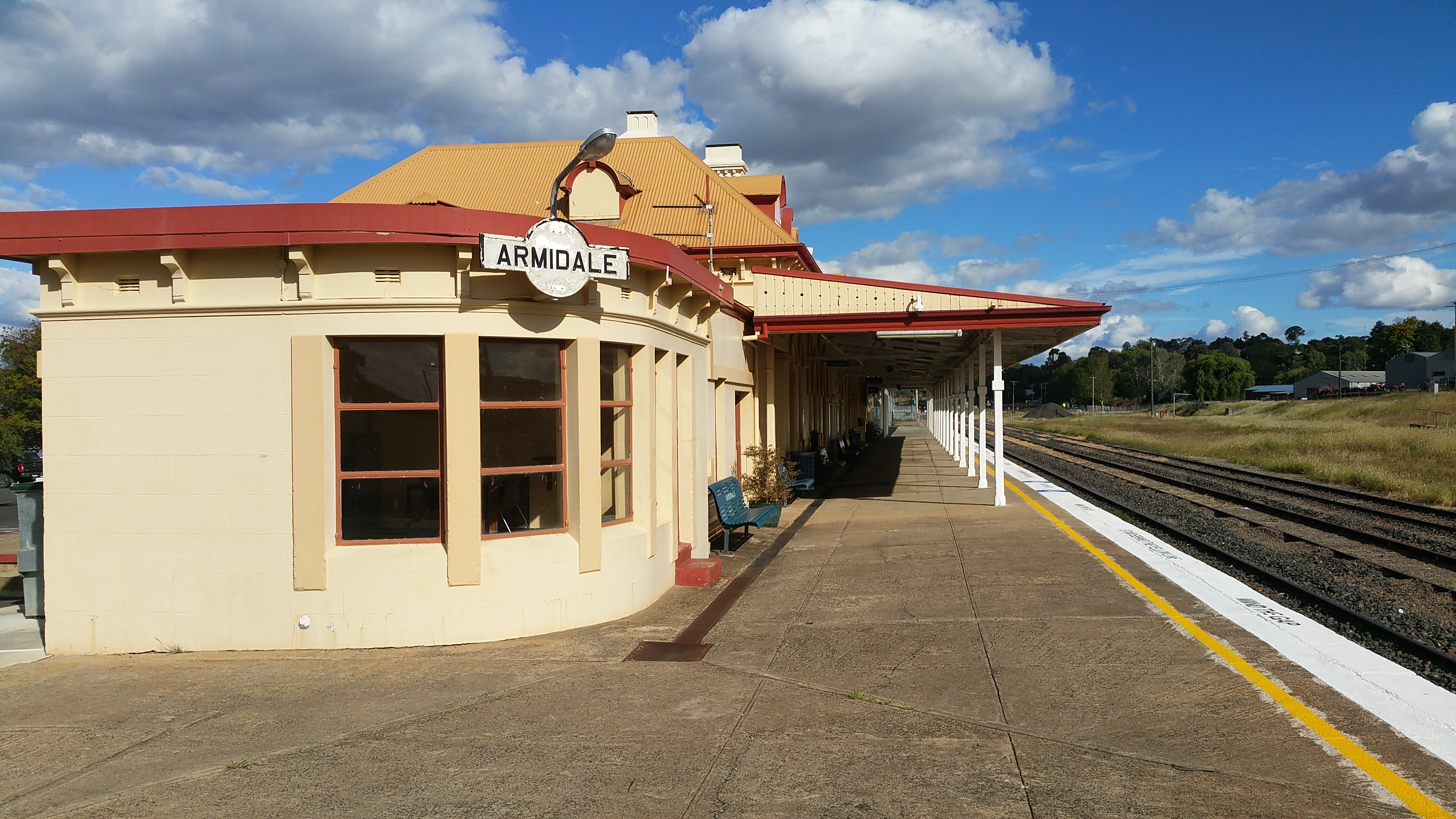
Station platform

Armidale station is served by NSW TrainLink's daily Northern Tablelands Xplorer service operating to and from Sydney. It is also served by weekly (Tuesday only) NSW TrainLink coach service to Inverell and daily NSW TrainLink coach service to Tenterfield.

Platform	Line	Stopping pattern	Notes
1	North Western Region	services to Sydney Central	

== Description ==
The station buildings have a good level of integrity/intactness.

=== Station building (1883) ===
This is a major first-class station building constructed of rendered brick with a pavilion at each end. The main booking office is located centrally and is marked by a raised transverse gable roof and separate entrance roof. The entrance is flanked by verandahs with cast-iron columns decorated with filigree detailing. The platform awning is largely in the form of the earlier buildings and is also supported on cast-iron columns and brackets. The building has a well-detailed decorative dentil course with projecting brickwork. The roof is now clad in corrugated iron (formerly slate). Some sections of the verandah have been in-filled as has the section linking the eastern pavilion to the main building.

The building does not follow the standard lineal arrangement seen in many railway structure, with the station master's office on the street side accessed through the ticket office and parcels, separated from the booking hall with a main street entrance. The building also has two ladies waiting rooms, one at each end of the building.

=== Goods shed (1883) ===
It is a large structure consisting of two sections: the first, is of timber construction built in 1883 with a gabled, corrugated, galvanised iron roof that overhangs the building, supported by timber braces, and provides covering for two loading stages on both sides of the building. The building includes a storeroom and an office, which originally was an annex to the building but is now covered by the second section. The second section is a brick and patent steel extension constructed in 1965 (partly re-clad in the 1980s) that provides a large, covered loading area. The loading crane has been removed.

=== Other structures ===
The station platform dates from 1883 and has a brick face with ramped ends. The brick face dock platform is also heritage-listed.

The barracks is a c. 1880s masonry building and c. 1940s timber building. It is of brick-and-timber construction with a covered verandah (12.5 m). It is possibly the oldest extant drivers' rest house, although the roof not original.

The former per way offices and sheds is a corrugated, galvanised iron structure currently housing a trike collection.

The 1899 turntable is of 18.2 m diameter and is also separately listed on the New South Wales Heritage Register.

The station sign, scales, station clock and fences are also heritage-listed.

== Heritage listing ==
Armidale railway station was listed on the New South Wales State Heritage Register on 2 April 1999.

== See also ==
- List of regional railway stations in New South Wales
