= CountryLink =

New South Wales government rail and road passenger operator

- Second CountryLink logo

Agency overview
- Formed: 16 January 1989
- Preceding agency: State Rail Authority
- Dissolved: 30 June 2013
- Superseding agency: NSW TrainLink
- Jurisdiction: New South Wales
- Headquarters: Sydney
- Parent agency: State Rail Authority (1989–2003); RailCorp (2004–2013)
- Key document: Transport Administration Act, 1988 (NSW)
- Website: www.countrylink.info

CountryLink was a passenger rail and road service brand that operated in regional areas of New South Wales, and to and from Canberra, Brisbane and Melbourne. Originally created as a business unit (or sub-brand) of the State Rail Authority of New South Wales, it later became a subsidiary of RailCorp. CountryLink operated rail services using XPT and Xplorer rolling stock, with connecting coach services operated under contract by private operators.

Its services were taken over by NSW TrainLink.

== History ==
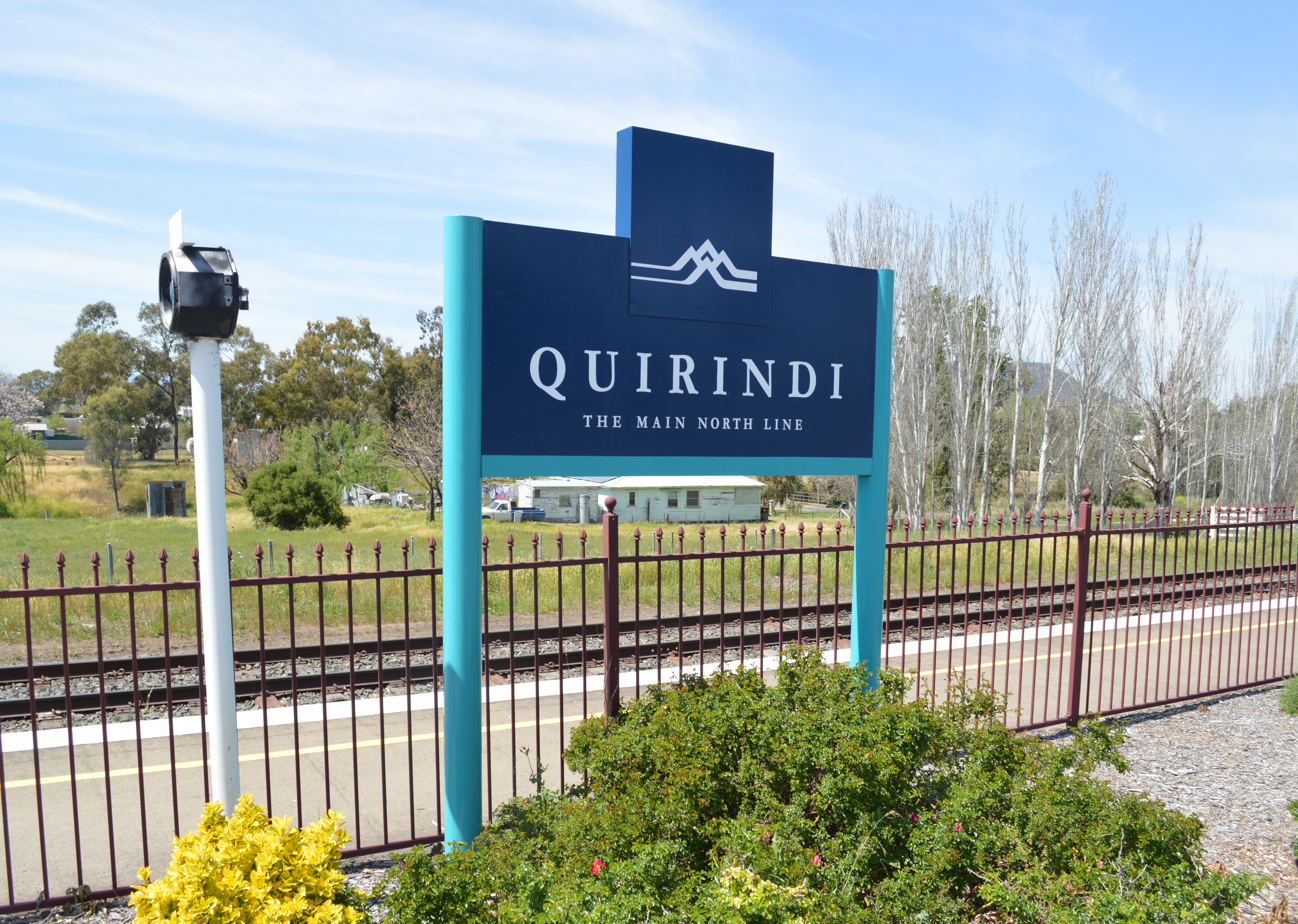
CountryLink branded station sign

CountryLink was established in January 1989 under the Transport Administration Act 1988 as a business unit of what was then the State Rail Authority to operate all non-metropolitan long distance passenger services. It inherited a fleet of XPT and locomotive-hauled passenger trains. Following the election of the Greiner State Government in March 1988, consultants Booz Allen Hamilton were commissioned to prepare a report into NSW rail services. On purely economic grounds, the report recommended closing all country passenger services as they were judged unviable, however this was not politically acceptable. If services were to be maintained, the report recommended an 'all XPT' option with an expanded network of coach services replacing many other services.

In November 1989, the Silver City Comet was withdrawn, while in February 1990 the Brisbane Limited and Pacific Coast Motorail were withdrawn and replaced by XPT services, the Canberra XPT was withdrawn and replaced by locomotive-hauled stock and the Northern Tablelands Express was truncated to Tamworth with road coaches introduced from Sydney to Armidale. The Intercapital Daylight ceased in August 1991 and the Sydney/Melbourne Express in November 1993 was replaced by an XPT in November 1993 following the delivery of additional stock.

In a June 1990 policy reversal, the government announced that it would purchase 17 Xplorer carriages to reintroduce services to Armidale and Moree and replace locomotive-hauled stock and coaches on services to Canberra. This would release an XPT to operate a daily service to operate the Grafton Express replacing a weekly locomotive-hauled service that was reintroduced at the same time. The Xplorers entered service on the North Western service in October 1993 and on the Canberra service in December 1993. In November 1994 the government ordered a further four Xplorer carriages.

In October 1990, the government announced that eight sleeper carriages would be ordered for use on overnight services to Brisbane, Murwillumbah and Melbourne. These were included in an order placed with ABB, Dandenong in 1991 for four power cars and 13 trailers that was jointly funded by the New South Wales and Victorian Governments.

In December 1994, a daylight service to Melbourne resumed by extending the Riverina XPT from Albury.

In 1995, CountryLink trialled three Swedish Railways X2000 tilting train carriages. After conducting a statewide tour in March, they were used on Canberra services from April until June with two modified XPT power cars.

In March 1996, services were reintroduced to Broken Hill and Griffith using refurbished locomotive-hauled rolling stock honouring an election commitment by the Carr State Government. Following the electrification of the Illawarra line from Dapto to Kiama, CityRail was able to release one of its mechanically identical Endeavours and this was converted to an Xplorer to replace the locomotive-hauled stock.

With the formation of RailCorp, responsibility for CountryLink transferred to the new corporation in January 2004. With the closure of the Muwillumbah branch, services were cut back to Casino from May 2004.

CountryLink was merged with the intercity services of CityRail to form NSW TrainLink on 1 July 2013.

=== Patronage ===
The following table lists patronage figures for the network during the corresponding financial year. Australia's financial years start on 1 July and end on 30 June.

CountryLink patronage by financial year from 1992–93
| 1990s | Year | | | 1992–93 | 1993–94 | 1994–95 | 1995–96 | 1996–97 | 1997–98 | 1998–99 | 1999-00 |
| 1990s | Patronage (millions) | | | 2.2 | 2.1 | 2.2 | 2.4 | 2.5 | 2.5 | 2.4 | 2.4 |
| 1990s | Reference | | | | | | | | | | |
| 2000s | Year | 2000–01 | 2001–02 | 2002–03 | 2003–04 | 2004–05 | 2005–06 | 2006–07 | 2007–08 | 2008–09 | 2009–10 |
| 2000s | Patronage (millions) | 2.1 | 2.2 | 2.0 | 1.8 | 1.8 | 1.7 | 1.6 | 1.6 | 1.7 | 1.8 |
| 2000s | Reference | | | | | | | | | | |
| 2010s | Year | 2010–11 | 2011–12 | 2012–13 | | | | | | | |
| 2010s | Patronage (millions) | 1.9 | 2.0 | 1.9 | | | | | | | |
| 2010s | Reference | | | | | | | | | | |

== Network ==
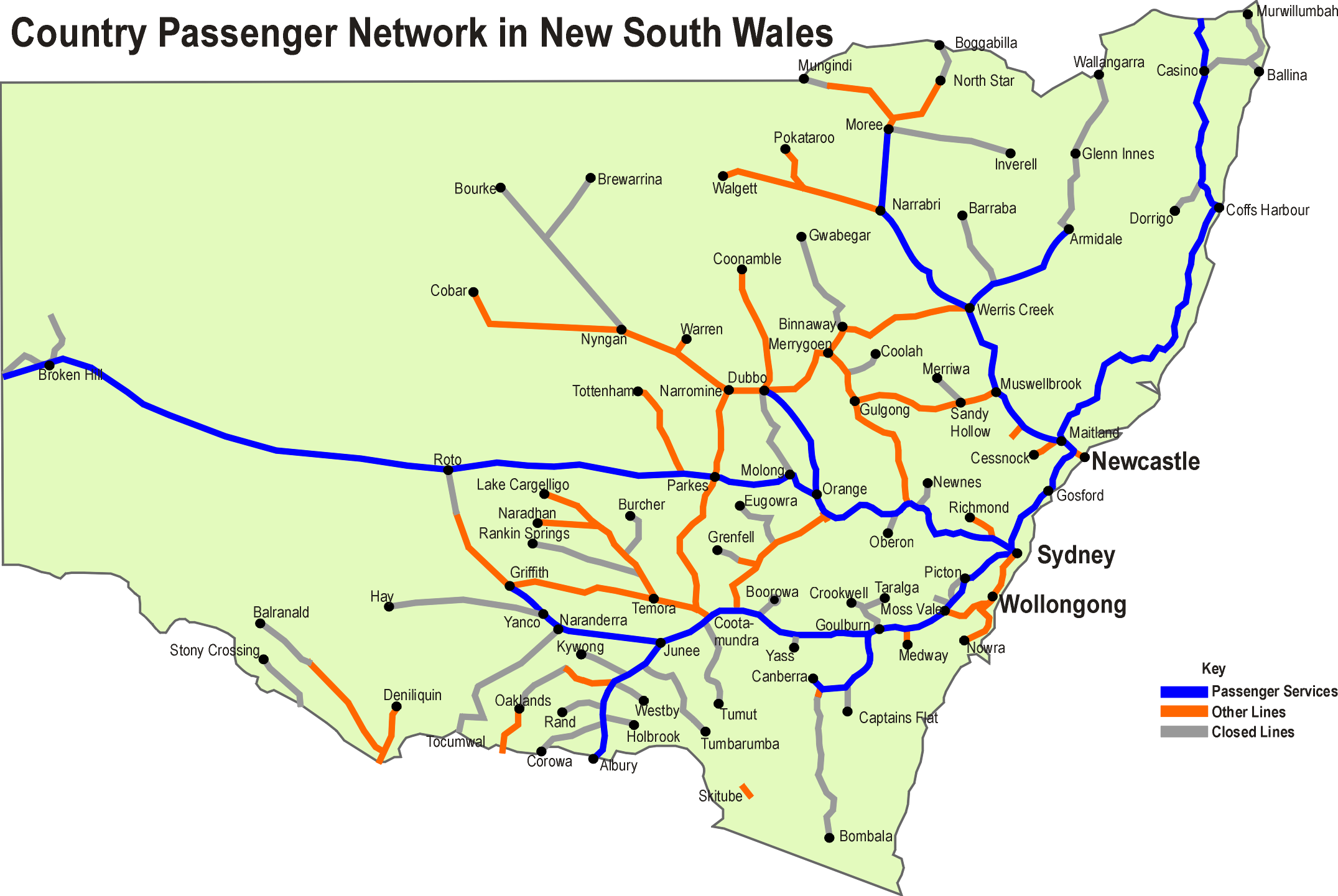
CountryLink rail network as of 2007

CountryLink operated its own rolling stock over track managed by RailCorp in Sydney and the Australian Rail Track Corporation and Rail Infrastructure Corporation outside of Sydney. The hub of its operation was Sydney Central railway station.

=== North Coast ===
The North Coast region covers the North Coast, Northern Rivers and South East Queensland regions. Accordingly, the Government of Queensland made a contribution to the provision of these services. North Coast region services appeared on the network map in red. Services ran along the Main North and North Coast lines from Sydney Central station to Roma Street station in Brisbane.

Principal stations served by XPT trains were:

- Taree
- Kempsey
- Coffs Harbour
- Grafton
- Casino
- Brisbane

Cities and towns served by CountryLink coaches connecting off North Coast services included: Tea Gardens, Forster, Port Macquarie, Yamba, Moree, Lismore, Alstonville, Ballina, Byron Bay, Murwillumbah, Tweed Heads and Surfers Paradise.

=== North Western ===
The North Western region covers the state's Hunter, Northern Tablelands and North West regions. North Western region services appeared on the network map in orange. Services ran along the Main North line from Sydney Central station to Werris Creek where the service divided for Armidale and Moree.

Principal stations served by Xplorer trains were:

- Singleton
- Scone
- Tamworth
- Armidale
- Gunnedah
- Narrabri
- Moree

Cities and towns served by CountryLink coaches connecting off North Western services included: Wee Waa, Inverell, Grafton, Glen Innes and Tenterfield.

=== Western ===
The Western region covers the Central Tablelands and Western regions. Western region services appeared on the network map in yellow. Services ran along the Main Western Line from Sydney Central station to Dubbo and the Broken Hill line to Broken Hill.

Principal stations served by XPT trains were:

- Bathurst
- Orange
- Dubbo

Principal stations served by Xplorer trains were:

- Bathurst
- Orange
- Parkes
- Broken Hill

Cities and towns served by CountryLink coaches connecting off Southern services included: Oberon, Mudgee, Baradine, Cowra, Grenfell, Forbes, Parkes, Condobolin, Lightning Ridge Brewarrina, Bourke, Warren and Broken Hill.

=== Southern ===
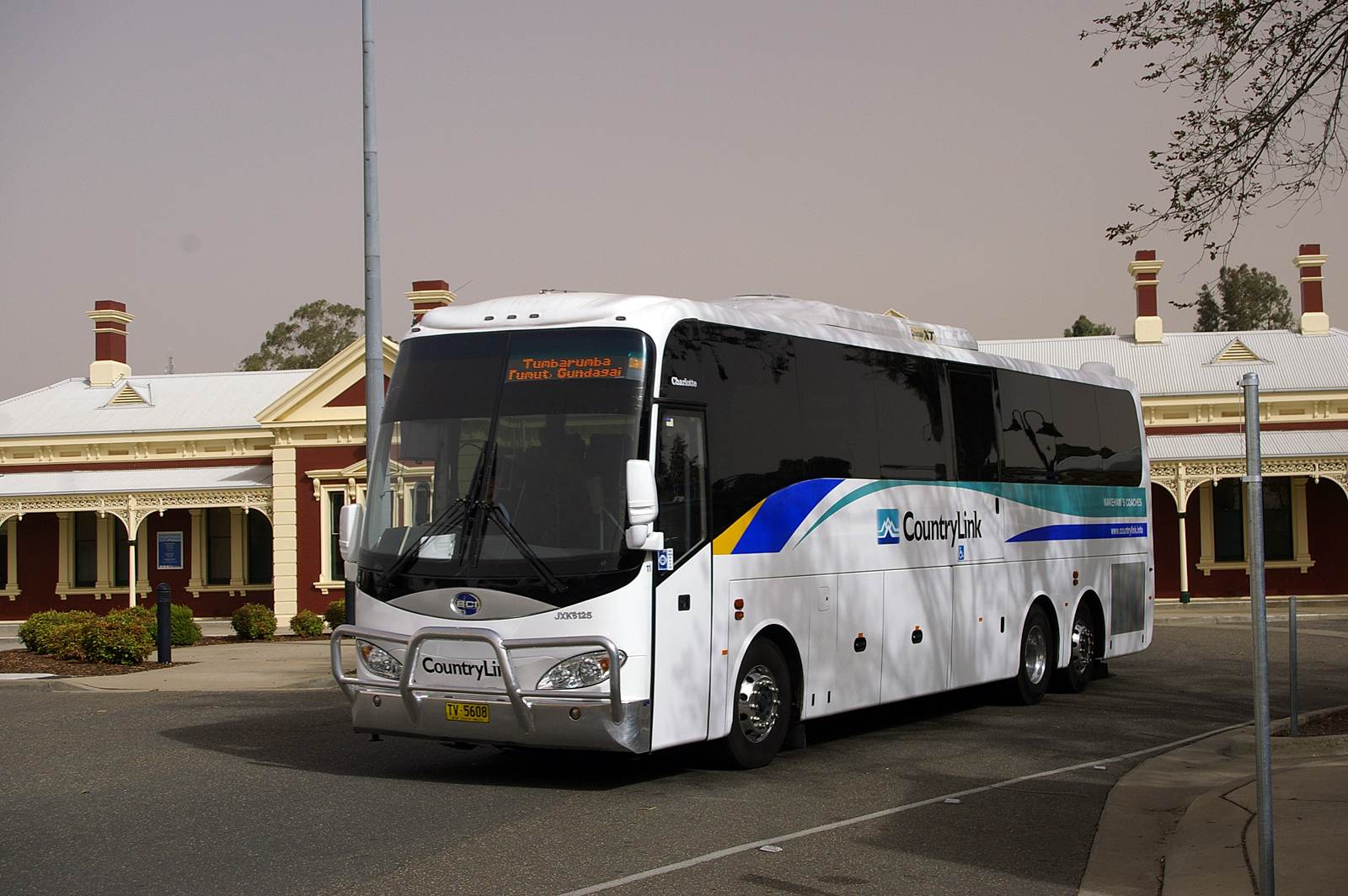
Makeham's Coaches BCI 6125 (ISM) coach departing Wagga Wagga station in April 2009

The Southern region covers the state's Illawarra, South Coast, Snowy Mountains, South West Slopes, Southern Tablelands, Riverina and Sunraysia regions plus the Australian Capital Territory and parts of Victoria. Accordingly, the Government of Victoria (though not the ACT Government) made a contribution to the provision of these services. Southern region services appeared on the network map in green. Services ran along the Main South line from Sydney Central station to Albury before continuing on the North East line to Southern Cross station in Melbourne, with the line to Canberra branching off south of Goulburn and the line to Griffith at Junee.

Principal stations served by XPT trains were:

- Goulburn
- Cootamundra
- Wagga Wagga
- Albury
- Wangaratta
- Melbourne

Principal stations served by Xplorer trains were:

- Goulburn
- Queanbeyan
- Canberra
- Cootamundra
- Griffith

Cities and towns served by CountryLink coaches connecting off Southern services included: Wollongong, Bombala, Eden, Tumbarumba, Bathurst, Dubbo, Condobolin, Griffith, Mildura and Echuca.

== Rolling stock ==
The final CountryLink fleet consisted of two train types, XPT (19 power cars and 60 carriages) and Xplorers (23 carriages). The XPT fleet was maintained at the purpose built XPT Service Centre. The Xplorer fleet was maintained at the Xplorer-Endeavour Service Centre.

Fleet (italics = in service today under TfNSW)
| Class | Image | Top Speed (km/h) | In service (under Countrylink) |
|---|---|---|---|
| XPT Diesel Multiple Units | An XPT in its original livery at Bathurst for a Dubbo service. XPT in the final CountryLink livery at Sydney Central | 193 | 1989–present |
| Xplorer Diesel Multiple Units | Xplorer in the late livery crossing the Queanbeyan River railway bridge. Xplorer in original CountryLink livery at Sydney Central | 145 | 1993–present |
| XP2000/2009 (Tilt Train mod) | | 193 | April 1995 – June 1995 |
| X2000 Tilt Train (non powered cars only) | | n/a | April 1995 – June 1995 |
| HUB coaches | RDH 2220, same location as below image | n/a | 1989–1994 1996 – April 2000 |
| RUB coaches | NDS 2268 at Broadmeadow Locomotive Depot | n/a | 1989–1994 1996 – April 2000 |
| Stainless Steel coaches | | n/a | 1989–1993 |
| 73 Class Locomotive | | 64 | 1989–2013 |

== Road coaches ==
The Public Transport Commission had first introduced coaches in September 1975 when six Dennings were introduced to replace all train services out of Dubbo. Coaches replaced many branch line rail services over the next few years and by 1987 the State Rail Authority had 36 Denning, Hino and Scania coaches operating throughout the state.

CountryLink adopted the model used by V/Line in Victoria and contracted out the provision of these services to private operators, with services transferring to the successful bidders between November 1989 and June 1990.

Coaches were originally painted in CountryLink's grey, white and blue livery. Following the transfer of the administration of coach services to the Department of Transport in July 1992, operators were not required to repaint coaches dedicated to CountryLink duties, thus most operated in the livery of their owners. This policy was later reversed and coaches once again were painted in CountryLink livery.

The full list of coach operators providing services at the time CountryLink ceased in June 2013 were:

| Operator | Services |
|---|---|
| Australia Wide Coaches | Lithgow to Bathurst, Orange & Parkes |
| Busways | Wauchope to Port Macquarie |
| Edwards Coaches | Armidale to Tenterfield |
| Greyhound Australia | Lithgow to Gulgong, Coonabarabran & Baradine |
| Loader's Coaches | Lithgow to Grenfell |
| Makehams Coaches | Wagga Wagga to Griffith; Wagga Wagga/Cootamundra to Tumbarumba; Cootamundra to Queanbeyan; Cootamundra to Mildura |
| Oberon Bus Company | Mount Victoria to Oberon |
| Ogden's Coaches | Lithgow to Dubbo & Nyngan; Bathurst/Dubbo to Cootamundra; Dubbo to Lightning Ridge, Bourke & Broken Hill |
| Port Stephens Coaches | Broadmeadow to Taree |
| G&J Purtill, Moama | Wagga Wagga/Albury to Echuca |
| Roadcoach | Wollongong to Moss Vale; Moss Vale to Goulburn |
| Sunstate Coaches | Grafton to Byron Bay; Casino to Tweed Heads; Casino to Surfers Paradise; Casino to Brisbane |
| Symes Coaches | Tamworth/Armidale to Inverell; Moree to Grafton |
| Transborder Express | Canberra to Bombala & Eden |
| Western Road Liners | Parkes to Condobolin |
| Wolters Bus & Coach Service | Narrabri to Wee Waa & Burren Junction |

== Parry Report 2005 ==
=== Ministerial Inquiry ===
On 9 December 2003, the Minister for Transport Services released Professor Tom Parry's Final Report of the Ministerial Inquiry into Sustainable Transport. Known as the "Parry Report" it recommended refocusing CountryLink, and to adjust fare structures.

"CountryLink currently operates a number of train services that move relatively small numbers of passengers," the inquiry has concluded, noting that the high cost of maintenance and the need to replace rolling stock "makes these services very expensive ... they are expected to become even more expensive in the future." At the time of the report operating expenditure is around five times as much as revenue gained through ticket sales.

The Inquiry also noted that in the year ended June 2003, CountryLink incurred $29.9 million in costs associated with advertising, booking and selling tickets, against $43.5 million in fare revenue. "This is more than two-thirds of the revenue received from passengers and is excessive," the Inquiry report stated.

The Inquiry made eight specific recommendations for "refocusing CountryLink":

- review the allocation of costs to CountryLink to improve the transparency of government railway accounts
- seek efficiencies in the marketing of tickets
- align subsidies to CountryLink with the benefits to the community
- seek to have the ACT Government contribute to the cost of the Sydney-Canberra service
- explore alternatives to rail on a case-by-case basis for all rural and regional routes
- include CountryLink in integrated regional transport planning
- establish "Solutions Teams" to assess various areas of CountryLink's operations
- review fare structures and discounting

=== Government response ===
In 2005 the State Government announced a rationalisation of ticket offices across the CountryLink network, but ruled out the closure of further rail services in the immediate future. Ticket prices increased on 1 November.

Transport minister John Watkins told the Sydney Morning Herald that "To protect commuters who want a continued rail option, the Government has made a number of changes to booking options in an effort to secure CountryLink's future and boost patronage." Mr Watkins also said in front of news crew that the refurbishment of the XPTs would also encourage more people to use the trains. However the Opposition questioned how price increases would increase patronage.

== Restructure ==
In May 2012, the newly elected O'Farrell State Government announced RailCorp would be restructured, with CountryLink and the regional services of CityRail incorporated into NSW TrainLink in July 2013.

== Publication ==
CountryLink published an in-house journal, Freight Rail & Countrylink Xpress, in conjunction with Freight Rail.
