= Bellata railway station =

Railway station in New South Wales, Australia

Bellata
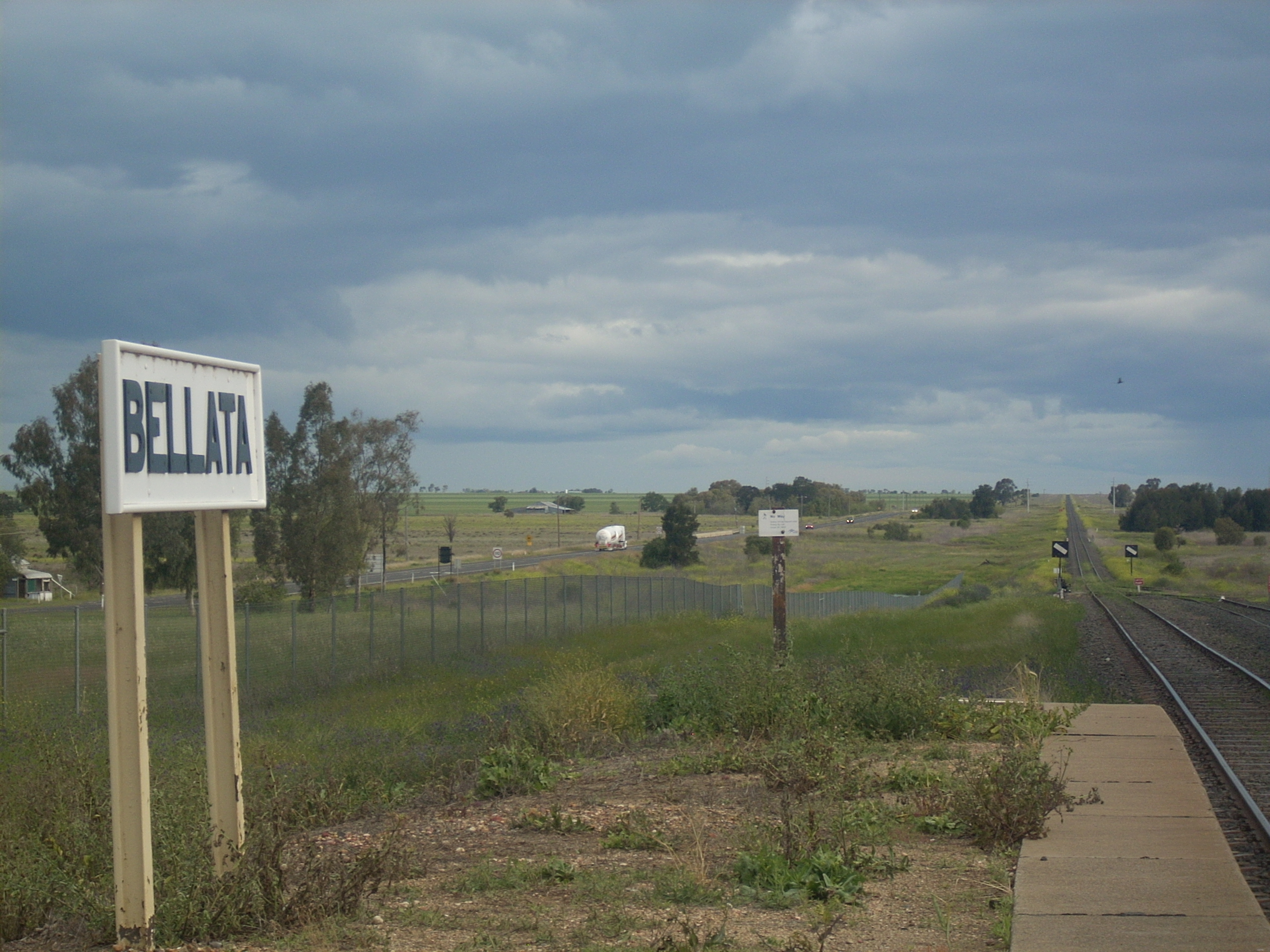
- Southbound view from the platform in 2011

General information
- Location: Newell Highway, Bellata; Australia
- Coordinates: 29°54′56″S 149°47′25″E
- System: Side platform
- Owner: Transport Asset Manager of New South Wales
- Operator: NSW TrainLink
- Line: Mungindi
- Distance: 615.46 kilometres (382.43 mi) from Central
- Platforms: 1
- Tracks: 2

Construction
- Structure type: Ground
- Accessible: Yes

Other information
- Station code: BZT

History
- Opened: 1 April 1897
- Closed: 31 March 2021
- Rebuilt: April–October 2021 due to the ARTC Inland Rail Project
- Former names: Woolabra (1897–1909)

Services
Preceding station	NSW TrainLink	Following station
Moree Terminus	NSW TrainLink North Western Line	Narrabri towards Sydney
Former services
Preceding station	Former services	Following station
Gurley towards Mungindi	Mungindi Line	Edgeroi towards Werris Creek
Location

Bellata railway station is located on the Mungindi line in New South Wales, Australia. It serves the village of Bellata, opening on 1 April 1897 as Woolabra when the line was extended from Boggabri to Moree. It was renamed Bellata on 1 March 1909.

== Services ==
Bellata is served by NSW TrainLink's daily Northern Tablelands Xplorer service operating between Moree and Sydney. This station is a request stop, so the train only stops here if passengers have booked to board/alight here.

Platform	Line	Stopping pattern	Notes
1	North Western Region	services to Sydney Central & Moree	request stop (booked passengers only)
