= Gurley, New South Wales =

Gurley
- Town
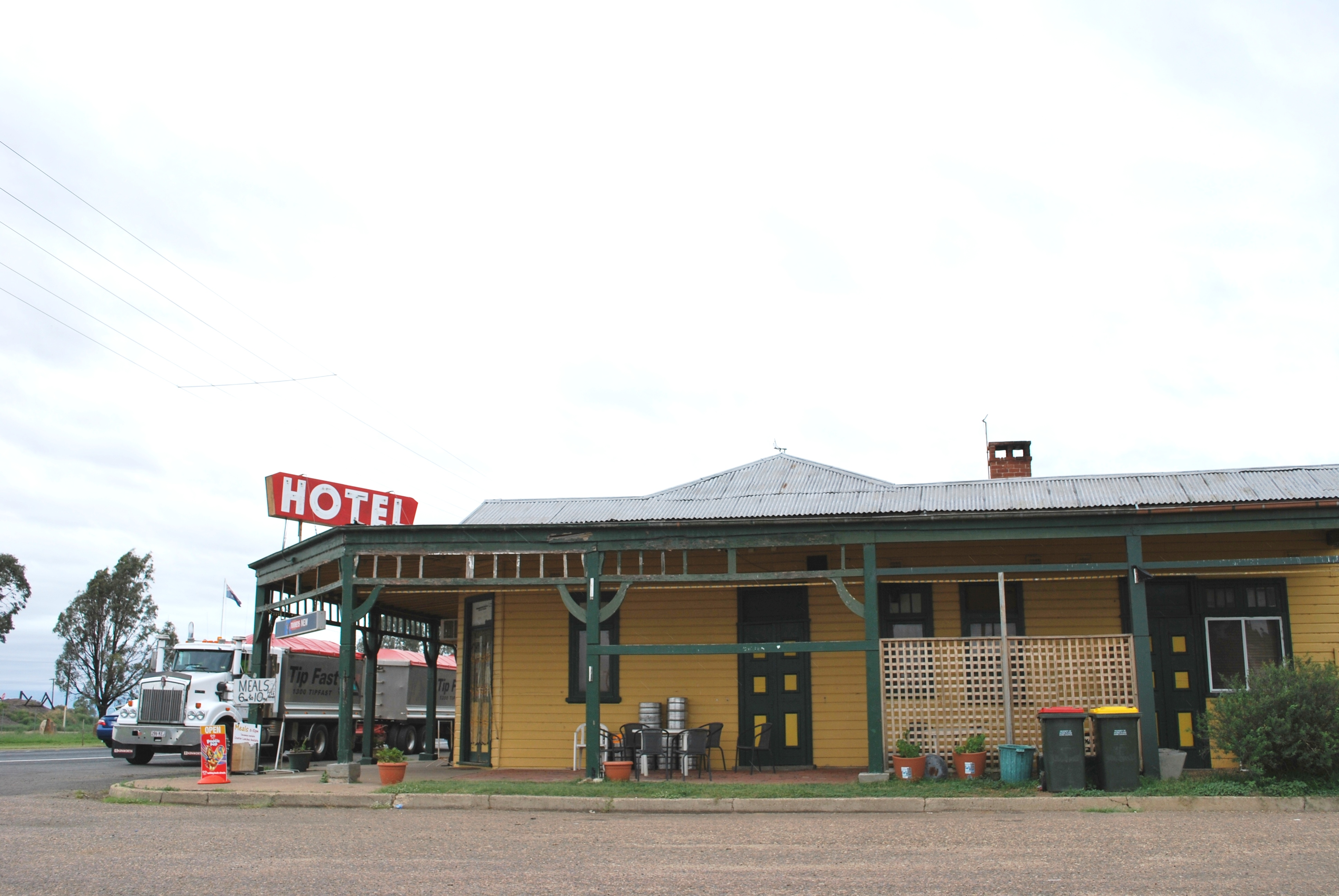
- Royal Hotel at Gurley

- Coordinates: 29°44′S 149°48′E
- Country: Australia
- State: New South Wales
- LGA: Moree Plains Shire
- Location: 33 km (21 mi) SE of Moree; 600 km (370 mi) NW of Sydney; 67 km (42 mi) N of Narrabri

Government
  - State electorate: Northern Tablelands
  - Federal division: Parkes
- Elevation: 220 m (720 ft)

Population
  - Total: 236 (2016 census)
- Postcode: 2398
Localities around Gurley
Moree	Moree	Biniguy
Millie	Gurley	Terry Hie Hie
Jews Lagoon	Bellata	Berrigal

Gurley is a small town in the North West Slopes region of New South Wales, Australia between Narrabri and Moree. The Newell Highway and the North-West railway line pass through the township. A now-closed railway station opened in 1897. According to the 2021 Census, Gurley had a population of 248, 2021 census reflecting a slight increase from 236 in 2016.

== History ==
Gurley Siding Post Office opened on 16 March 1898 and was renamed Gurley in 1917.

In 2022, Gurley was listed by the Australian Taxation Office as having a negative average taxable income of -$23,484. This was the lowest value reported nationally, which was likely attributed to the area's heavy reliance on agriculture and unfavourable growing conditions.

In September 2024, the Gurley community unveiled the 'Gurley Brick Project', a legacy initiative repurposing bricks and signage from the old Gurley Railway Station. This project, supported by Inland Rail and Trans4m Rail, aims to preserve the town's railway heritage. The restored 'Gurley' letters are now visible from the train line, symbolizing the town's historical connection to the railway.

In December 2024, Gurley's historic Royal Hotel, a central gathering place for over a century, was destroyed by a fire. The hotel, built in 1913 and owned by the McGirr family for approximately 60 years, was a significant landmark in the community. The fire occurred around 8:25 PM on December 12, and while emergency services extinguished the blaze, the building was lost. No injuries were reported, and investigations into the cause of the fire are ongoing.

The town continues to serve as a hub for the surrounding agricultural community, with local events and organizations fostering community engagement.

== Gurley railway station ==
Preceding station	Former services	Following station
Moree towards Mungindi	Mungindi Line	Bellata towards Werris Creek
