= Sunstate Coaches =

Interlink Coaches
- Formerly: Sunstate Charters
- Founded: November 1985 by Fred Carah and Gordon MacNicol
- Ceased operation: May 2025 (charter coaches); May 2026 (public coaches)
- Headquarters: Operational: Pinkenba; Registered: Eagle Farm
- Service area: Brisbane, Queensland; Gold Coast, Queensland; North Coast, New South Wales
- Service type: Coach
- Routes: 4
- Depots: 2
- Fleet: 22 (November 2015)
- Operator: D & S Holdings (Qld) Pty Ltd
- Manager: Angus Burton
- Website: www.sunstatecoaches.com.au

Sunstate Coaches, also known as Sunstate Charters, was an Australian coach operator founded in 1985. It operated coach charters in the Brisbane area, as well as operating public long-distance services under contract to NSW TrainLink. In May 2025, the charter division was purchased by Kangaroo Bus Lines. The business was renamed Interlink Coaches and continued operating NSW TrainLink services until May 2026.

== History ==
Sunstate was founded in November 1985 by Fred Carah, who was previously a director at Carah Coaches in Sydney, and Gordon MacNicol. Sunstate commenced operating services under the New South Wales Government's regional transport brand, CountryLink, in January 1997. In July 2016, Sunstate commenced operating a new five-year contract with its successor organisation, NSW TrainLink. This contract would be extended for an additional five years, until June 2026.

Sunstate sold their charter coach business to Kangaroo Bus Lines in May 2025. The remainder of the business was renamed Interlink Coaches, and continued operating NSW TrainLink services.

Interlink "unexpectedly" ended their contracted services in May 2026, with replacement operators in place until the new contracts began in July. The contract for the Brisbane to Casino route passed to Simes Bros Coaches.

== Operations ==
Sunstate operated depots in Eagle Farm and Burleigh Heads. As at November 2015, the fleet consisted of 22 coaches, with a charter fleet livery of white with cream and red stripes, and several coaches painted in orange NSW TrainLink livery.

Sunstate operated services under contract to NSW TrainLink from Brisbane, Surfers Paradise, and Byron Bay to Casino and Grafton, connecting with the XPT train service to Sydney.
