= Edgeroi =

- Town
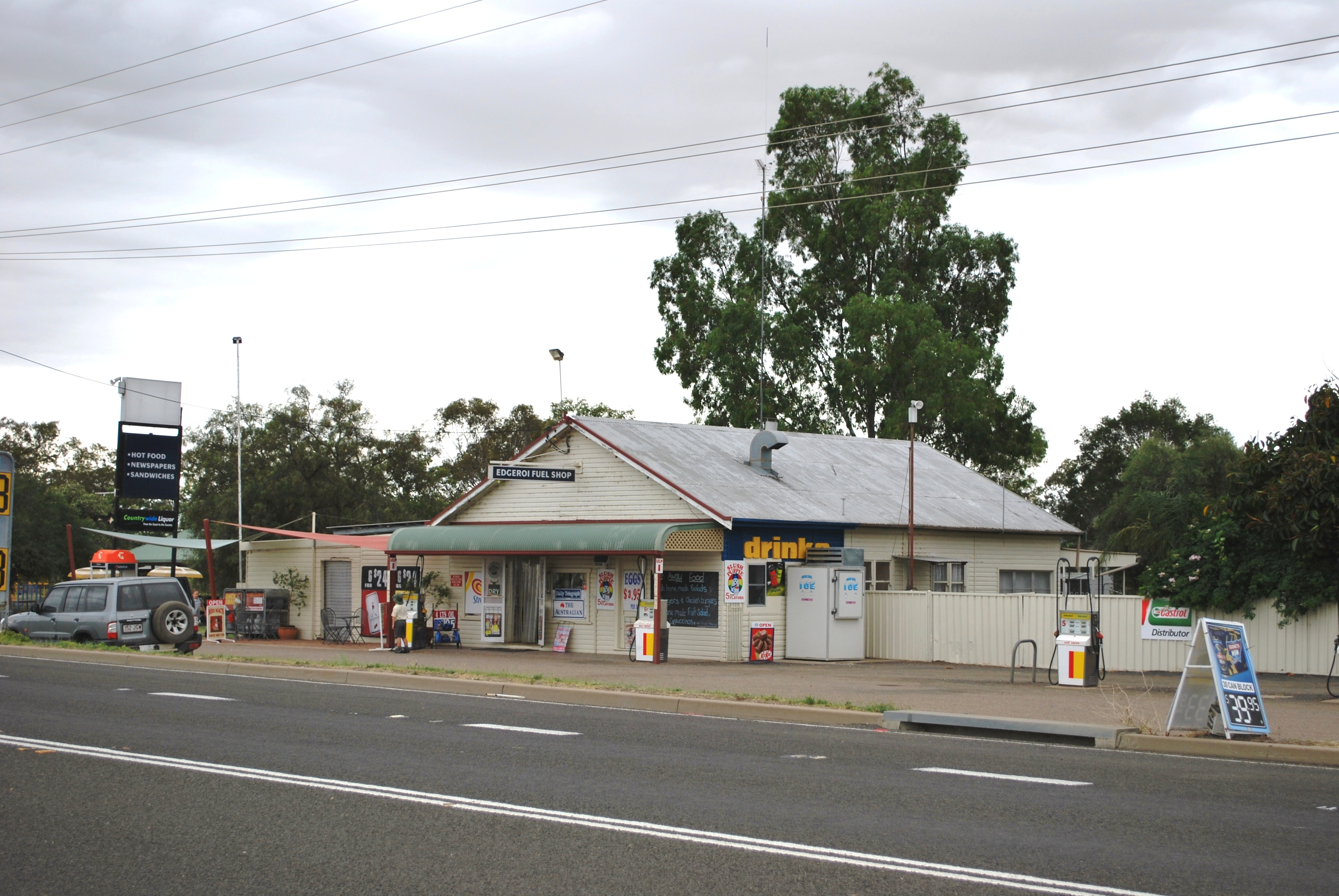
- Edgeroi Fuel stop

- Coordinates: 30°06′S 149°48′E
- Country: Australia
- State: New South Wales
- LGA: Narrabri Shire

Government
  - State electorate: Barwon
  - Federal division: Parkes

Population
  - Total: 96 (SAL 2021)
- Postcode: 2390

Edgeroi is a small township in the northwest of New South Wales, Australia, located between Narrabri and Moree. The Newell Highway and the North-West railway line pass through the township. The now-disused railway station opened in 1897. The War Memorial plaque from the railway station has been relocated to the vicinity of the Fuel Stop. The main industry of the district is agriculture and the village serves as a community centre for the local farmers as well as the railway grain silo.

There is a small CWA hall, a Memorial Hall and a windpump watering trough located behind the silo. The only street in Edgeroi is Queen Street. The township is 24 km, or 15 mins from Narrabri.

It takes its name from Edgeroi Station, one of the largest stations in north west New South Wales, which was divided into soldier settler blocks after World War II.

Edgeroi Post Office opened on 25 April 1910 and closed in 1987.

== Edgeroi railway station ==
Preceding station	Former services	Following station
Bellata towards Mungindi	Mungindi Line	Narrabri towards Werris Creek
