= Bellata =

- Town
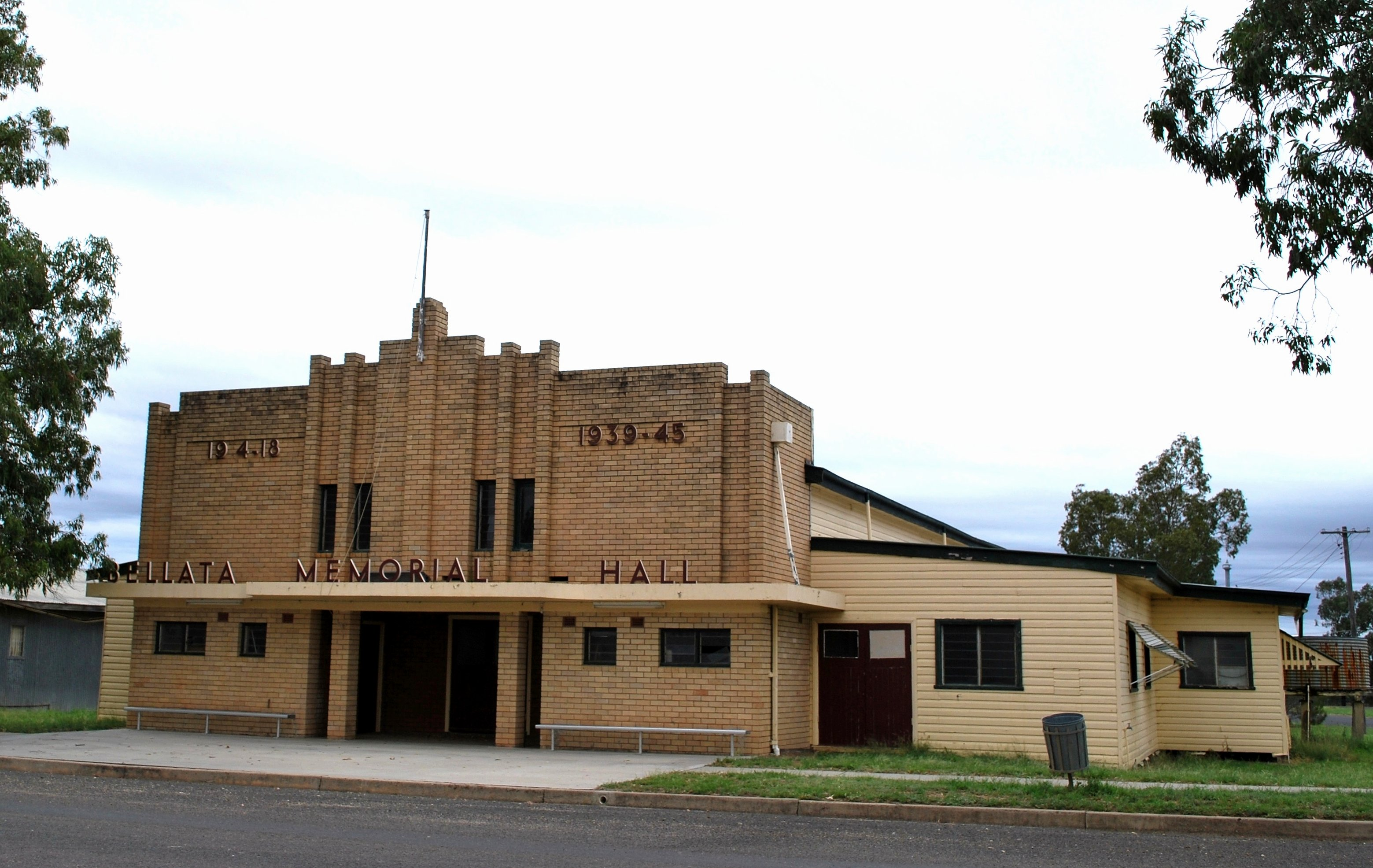
- Bellata Memorial Hall

- Coordinates: 29°55′S 149°47′E
- Country: Australia
- State: New South Wales
- LGA: Narrabri Shire
- Location: 563 km (350 mi) NW of Sydney; 535 km (332 mi) SW of Brisbane; 47 km (29 mi) N of Narrabri; 54 km (34 mi) S of Moree

Government
  - State electorate: Barwon
  - Federal division: Parkes

Population
  - Total: 266 (SAL 2021)
- Postcode: 2397

Bellata (postcode 2397) is a small village in north-central New South Wales, Australia, in Narrabri Shire. At the 2021 census, Bellata had a population of 266. The place name Bellata could be derived from the local Aboriginal word meaning "kangaroo" or possibly "home of belar trees".

== Overview ==
It is 47 kilometres (29 mi) north of Narrabri, around halfway between Narrabri and Moree when travelling along the Newell Highway. The village's area is known for its array of mineral deposits, and fossickers will find high quality agate, jasper, carnelian, petrified opal and petrified wood in the vicinity. Located on the rich black soil basalt plains of north western New South Wales, it is an important agricultural region and the area is known for some of the best "primehard" wheat production in Australia. There is a large array of grain storage and handling facilities in the town.

== Buildings ==
A turn-of-the-century, two-storey colonial style hotel, the Nandewar Inn Hotel, constructed in 1902, was a well-loved local landmark until it was destroyed by fire in April 2006. Once a thriving rural centre, Bellata, in the early to mid-20th century, boasted a post office, two general stores, two stock and station agencies, two garages, a café, a telephone exchange, a fully operational railway station with a station master and a doctor. Bellata still has a road house, a police station, primary school, nine-hole sand green golf course and Golf Club, tennis courts, Anglican and Catholic churches, a memorial hall where movies were once shown, caravan park and several community groups.

Woolabra Post Office opened on 1 September 1899 and was renamed Bellata in 1909.

=== Railway station ===
Bellata railway station is situated on the Mungindi line, 615 kilometres (382 mi) from Sydney. The station opened in 1897 as Woolabra however was renamed Bellata in 1909. It consists of a platform and unstaffed basic passenger waiting shed, and is currently served by a single daily Xplorer diesel railmotor between Moree and Sydney in the morning and by another Xplorer heading in the opposite direction to Moree in the evening.

The station is optional, and sometimes trains do not stop at it.
