= Boggabri railway station =

Railway station in New South Wales, Australia

Boggabri
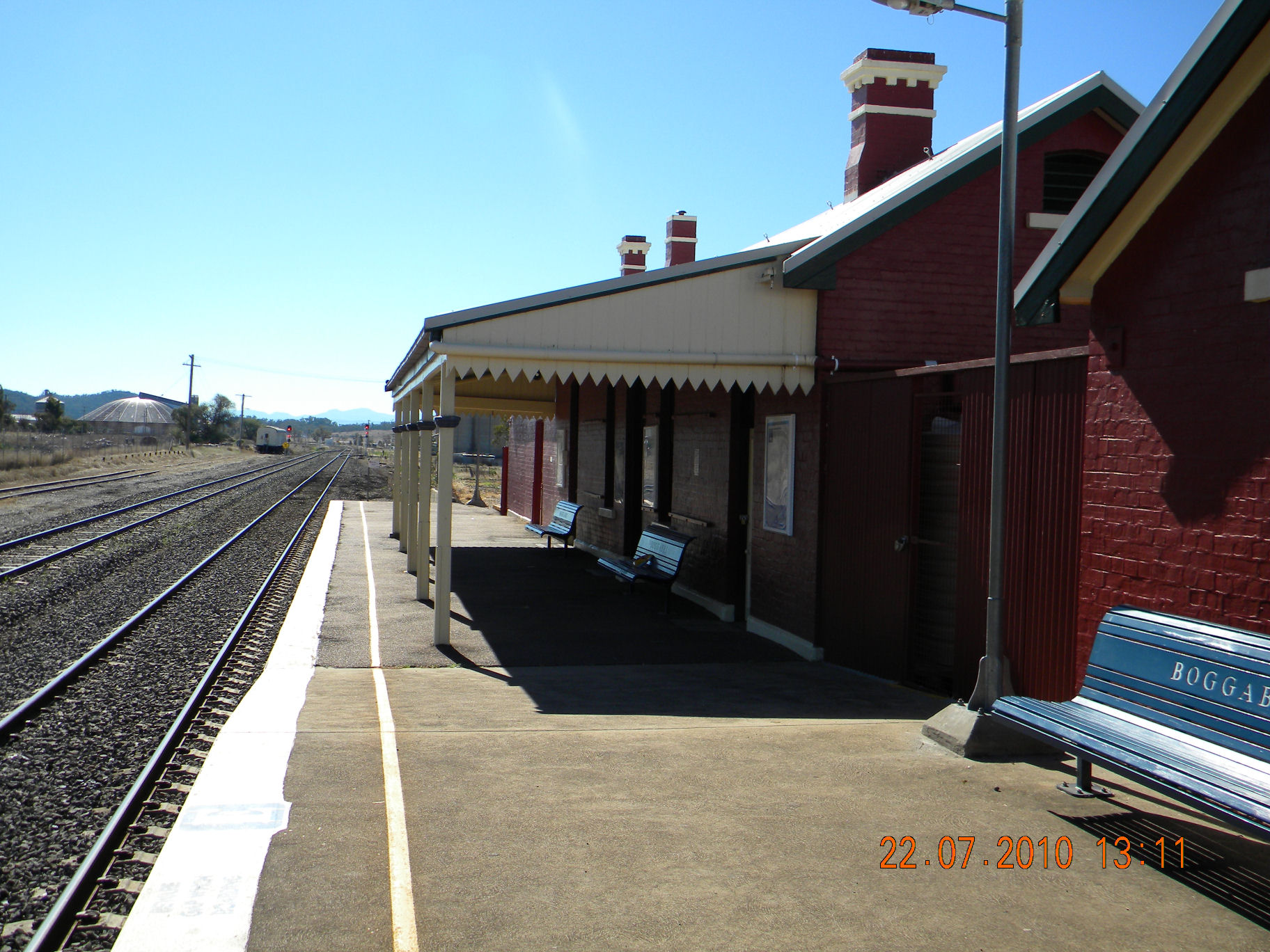

General information
- Location: Oakham Street, Boggabri; Australia
- Coordinates: 30°42′14″S 150°02′23″E
- System: Side platform
- Owner: Transport Asset Manager of New South Wales
- Operator: NSW TrainLink
- Line: Mungindi
- Distance: 515.17 kilometres (320.11 mi) from Central
- Platforms: 1
- Tracks: 2

Construction
- Structure type: Ground
- Accessible: Yes

Other information
- Station code: BGB

History
- Opened: 11 July 1882

Services
Preceding station	NSW TrainLink	Following station
Narrabri towards Moree	NSW TrainLink North Western Line	Gunnedah towards Sydney
Location

Boggabri railway station is located on the Mungindi line in New South Wales, Australia. It serves the town of Boggabri, opening on 11 July 1882 when the line was extended from Gunnedah. It served as the terminus of the line until it was extended to Moree on 1 April 1897.

== Coal ==
There are a number of coal mines served by balloon loops in the Boggabri area, although these are beyond the immediate station yard. The Maules Creek branch line leaves the Mungindi line roughly 4.5 km (2.8 mi) north of the station, leading to the Maules Creek loader and East Boggabri Coal Terminal, while a separate balloon loop suitable for a single 1340m train is located adjacent to the main line from a set of points just beyond the Maules Creek branch junction.

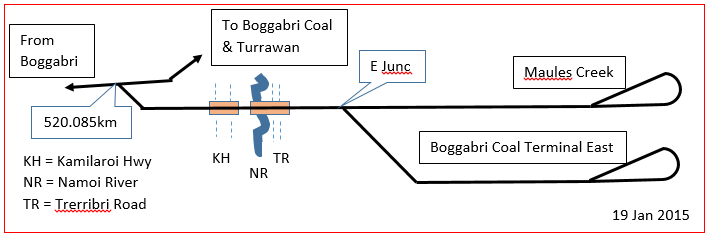
Maules Creek & Boggabri Coal Terminal East balloon loops

== Services ==
Boggabri is served by NSW TrainLink's daily Northern Tablelands Xplorer service operating between Moree and Sydney.

Platform	Line	Stopping pattern	Notes
1	North Western Region	services to Sydney Central & Moree	
