= Millie, New South Wales =

Millie
- Town
- Coordinates: 29°48′54″S 149°34′04″E
- Country: Australia
- State: New South Wales
- Region: North West Slopes
- LGA: Moree Plains Shire
- Location: 55 km (34 mi) SW of Moree; 620 km (390 mi) NW of Sydney; 77 km (48 mi) NNW of Narrabri

Government
  - State electorate: Northern Tablelands
  - Federal division: Parkes
- Elevation: 182 m (597 ft)

Population
  - Total: 14 (SAL 2021)
- Postcode: 2397
- County: Jamison
- Parish: Gehan
Localities around Millie
Mallowa	Mallowa	Moree
Mallowa	Millie	Gurley
	Jews Lagoon	Bellata

Millie is a small locality in Moree Plains Shire, in northern New South Wales, Australia. It lies about 45 km southwest of Moree and 600 km northwest of Sydney. At the 2016 census, it had a population of 28. According to William Ridley, "Millie" was a Kamilaroi name of meaning "white pipe clay" or "silicate of magnesia" (talc). Another 1901 source suggested it came from an Australian Aboriginal word "Mil" meaning "eye".

There was once a settlement there, also known as Millie, but all that remains of it now is an elaborate marble monument to Trooper James Duff who died at the Battle of Elands River in 1900. Millie once had a hotel known as Walford's Hotel. On 24 April 1865, the bushranger Captain Thunderbolt and two accomplices had taken over the bar, when their revels were interrupted by the arrival of a group of police. A gun battle followed, in which two policemen and one of the bushrangers, John Thompson, were wounded. Thompson was captured, but the other two bushrangers escaped, heading in different directions.
