= Narrabri railway station =

Railway station in New South Wales, Australia

Narrabri
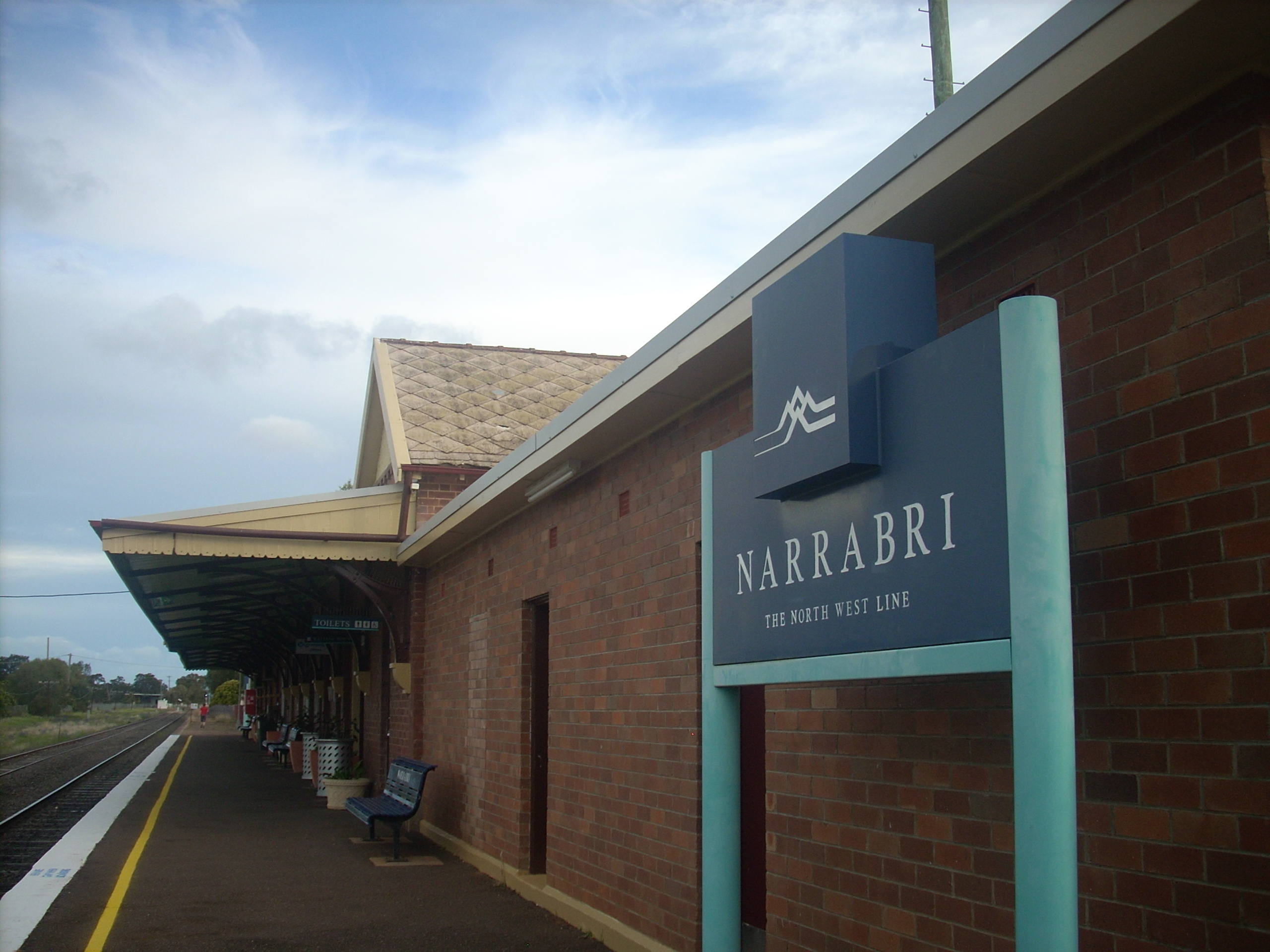

General information
- Location: Bowen Street, Narrabri; Australia
- Coordinates: 30°19′31″S 149°47′31″E
- System: Side platform
- Owner: Transport Asset Manager of New South Wales
- Operator: NSW TrainLink
- Line: Mungindi
- Distance: 569.20 kilometres (353.68 mi) from Central
- Platforms: 1
- Tracks: 2

Construction
- Structure type: Ground
- Accessible: Yes

Other information
- Station code: NAA

History
- Opened: 1 April 1897

Services
Preceding station	NSW TrainLink	Following station
Bellata towards Moree	NSW TrainLink North Western Line	Boggabri towards Sydney
Former services
Preceding station	Former services	Following station
Edgeroi towards Mungindi	Mungindi Line	Tibberena towards Werris Creek
Location

Narrabri railway station is located on the Mungindi line in New South Wales, Australia. It serves the town of Narrabri, opening on 1 April 1897 when the line was extended from Boggabri to Moree. Improvements were made to the station in 1920, with the shunting yard increased in size and the platform lengthened by sixty feet.

== Services ==
Narrabri is served by NSW TrainLink's daily Northern Tablelands Xplorer service operating between Moree and Sydney. NSW TrainLink also operate a coach service from Narrabri to Burren Junction.

Platform	Line	Stopping pattern	Notes
1	North Western Region	services to Sydney Central & Moree	
