= Mallowa, New South Wales =

Mallowa
- Town
- Coordinates: 29°37′53″S 149°22′47″E
- Country: Australia
- State: New South Wales
- Region: North West Slopes
- LGA: Moree Plains Shire
- Location: 70 km (43 mi) SW of Moree; 635 km (395 mi) NW of Sydney; 102 km (63 mi) E of Collarenebri

Government
  - State electorate: Northern Tablelands
  - Federal division: Parkes
- Elevation: 175 m (574 ft)

Population
  - Total: 108 (2016 census)
- Postcode: 2400
- County: Benarba
- Parish: Wolongimba
Localities around Mallowa
Collarenebri	Bullarah	Moree
Rowena	Mallowa	Millie
Bulyeroi	Spring Plains	Jews Lagoon

Mallowa is a small locality in Moree Plains Shire, in northern New South Wales, Australia. It lies about 70 km southwest of Moree and 635 km northwest of Sydney. At the 2016 census, it had a population of 108.
