= XPT Service Centre =

Railway depot

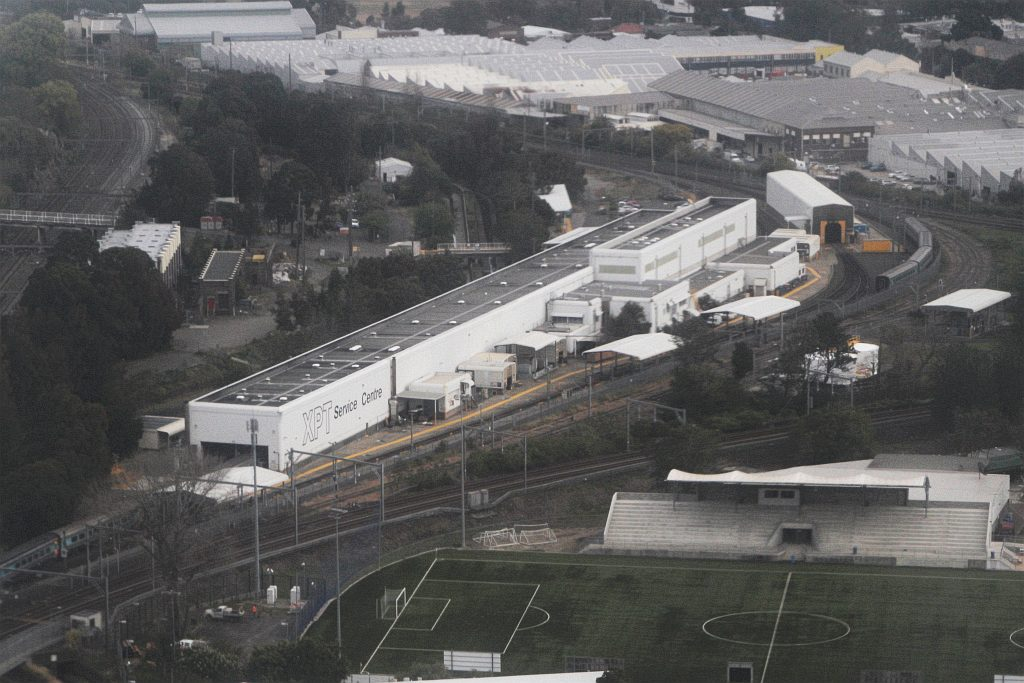
- XPT Service Centre viewed from the air
- Interactive map of XPT Service Centre

Location
- Location: Way Street, Tempe
- Coordinates: 33°55′03″S 151°09′36″E

Characteristics
- Owner: Transport Asset Manager of New South Wales
- Operator: Sydney Trains
- Depot code: XPT
- Roads: 4
- Rolling stock: XPT

History
- Opened: 1981

The XPT Service Centre is a railway depot operated by Sydney Trains in Tempe, Sydney for the long-distance XPT train fleet. Built in 1981, Endeavour railcars and long-distance Xplorer railcars also come to the depot for refuelling and washing.

== History ==
The XPT Service Centre was built within the confines of Meeks Road triangle between the Bankstown, Illawarra and Metropolitan lines immediately south of Sydenham station in 1981 to service the new XPT fleet. On 20 May 1994, an automatic washer was opened.

As well as being the home depot for the XPT fleet, Endeavour and Xplorer railcars visit the depot to be washed and refueled. It also services the Australian Rail Track Corporation's track inspection train when it is in Sydney.

For many years, 7301 was the depot's shunter. Since its withdrawal, this function has been performed by Pacific National and RailCorp 48 class locomotives.
