= New South Wales XPT =

Australian regional passenger train

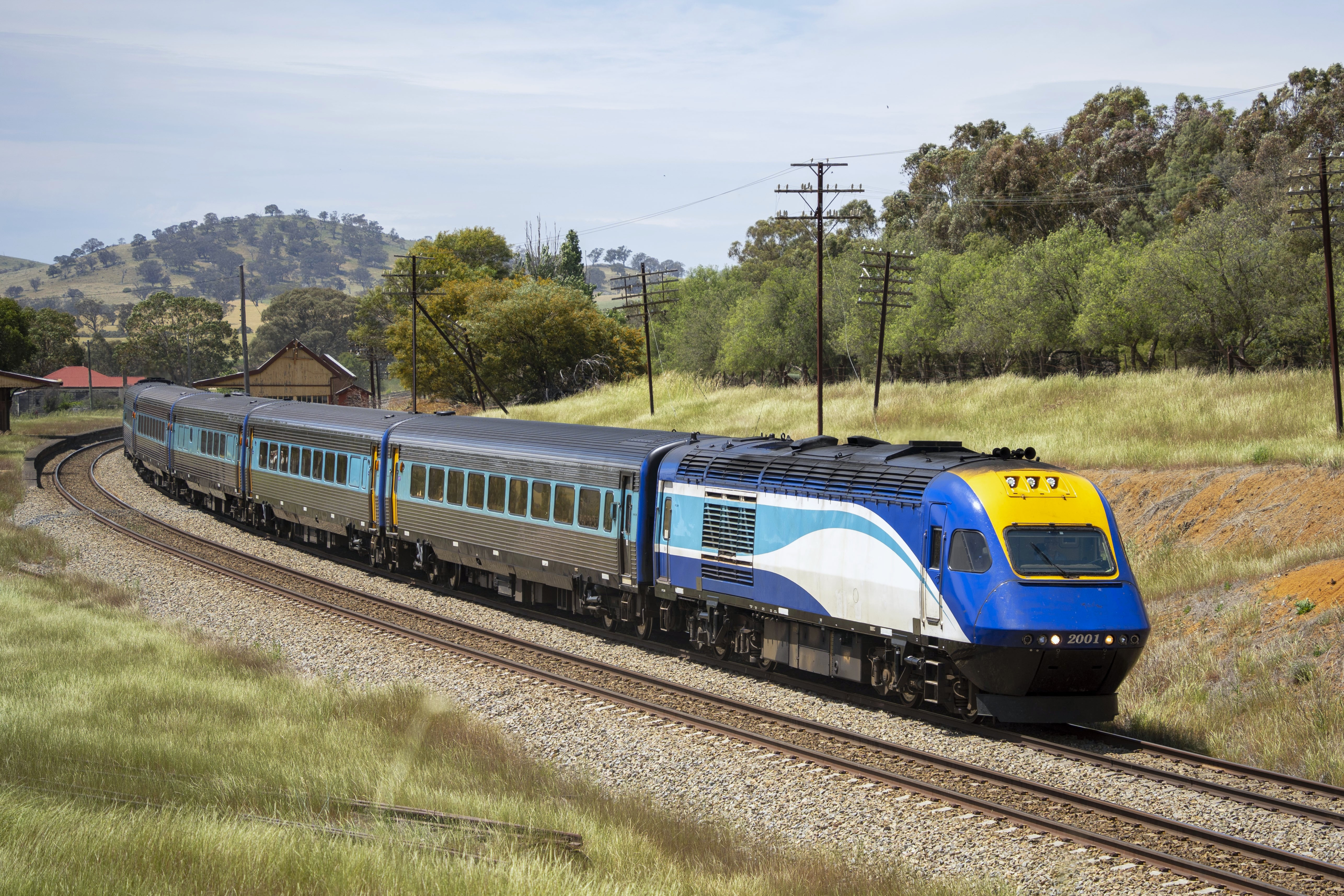
- An XPT passing through Galong, New South Wales, 2024

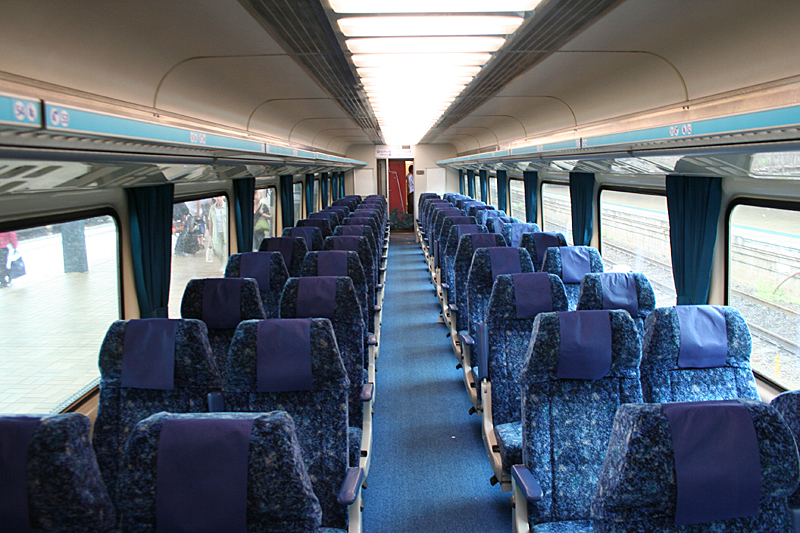
- Economy-class carriage, 2008
- Stock type: Diesel powered
- In service: 1982–present
- Manufacturers: Comeng, ABB
- Built at: Granville, Dandenong
- Constructed: 1981–1993
- Entered service: 8 April 1982
- Refurbished: 1992–1993, 2005–2008
- Number built: 19 power cars 60 carriages
- Number in service: 19 power cars 58 carriages
- Number scrapped: 2 carriages
- Successor: R set
- Formation: 4–7 carriages
- Fleet numbers: XP2000–XP2017, XP2019 XAM2175–2178, 2180–2182 XL2228, 2230–2236 XBR2150–2158 XF2200–2223 XFH2104–2110, XFH2112–13
- Operators: State Rail Authority; CountryLink; NSW TrainLink
- Lines served: Main Northern; North Coast; Main Western; Main Southern

Specifications
- Car body construction: Stainless steel
- Train length: Power car: 17.35 m (56 ft 11 in); 3-car: 75.75 m (248 ft 6 in); 4-car: 101 m (331 ft 4 in)
- Car length: Power car: 17.35 m (56 ft 11 in); Trailer: 25.25 m (82 ft 10 in)
- Width: Power car: 2.89 m (9 ft 6 in); Trailer: 2.92 m (9 ft 7 in)
- Height: Power car: 4.22 m (13 ft 10 in); Trailer: 4.04 m (13 ft 3 in)
- Doors: 2 per side, hinged slam
- Maximum speed: 200 km/h (124.3 mph) (design); 193 km/h (119.9 mph) (record); 160 km/h (99.4 mph) (service)
- Weight: 40 t (39 long tons; 44 short tons)
- Axle load: Power car: 19 t (19 long tons; 21 short tons); Trailer: 6.5 t (6.4 long tons; 7.2 short tons)
- Prime movers: Paxman Valenta (as built); Paxman VP185 (from 2000)
- Traction motors: Brush Electrical TMH 68–46
- Bogies: Power car: PLA Trailer: NHA
- Braking systems: Disc, air operated (Westcode EP with Automatic standby)
- Coupling system: Knuckle
- Track gauge: 1,435 mm (4 ft 8 1/2 in) standard gauge

The XPT (short for Express Passenger Train) is a class of diesel-powered passenger train operated around eastern Australia built by Comeng and ABB. Based on the British Rail-designed High Speed Train (HST), each XPT set comprises a power car on each end and, between them, from four to seven passenger carriages.

The XPT was procured following a competitive tendering process, with an initial contract for 30 trainsets, comprising 10 power cars and 20 carriages, in March 1980. The design of the HST was substantially modified. Testing commenced in August 1981 and the first set entered service under the State Rail Authority during January 1982. The XPT proved to be considerably faster than existing trains, reducing the journey time between Sydney and Melbourne by up to two hours.

Throughout the 1980s, additional XPT sets were procured, permitting the launch of services such as the Northern Tablelands XPT and the Riverina XPT. An XPT fare surcharge was discontinued in May 1985. During the early 1990s, sleeping cars were procured, permitting the XPT to effectively take on overnight services such as the Sydney/Melbourne Express. There were also advanced plans made for additional XPTs to be produced for Thailand, but they were later abandoned.

The XPTs are operated by NSW TrainLink, running on long-distance regional and interstate North Coast, Main Western and Main Southern line services throughout New South Wales and interstate into Victoria and Queensland.

The trains have been subject to refurbishments and overhauls to permit their use into the twenty-first century. During October 2016, the NSW government announced the XPT fleet would be entirely replaced as part of the Regional Train Project. The replacement fleet, originally set to enter service in 2023, has encountered delays (now scheduled for around 2028–2029), thus the XPT will operate longer than originally anticipated with the potential for them to be retained after the new trains enter service.

== History ==
=== Development ===
Improving public transport was a major issue in the 1976 New South Wales state election. One of the commitments of the incoming Wran government was to buy new rolling stock for country rail services.

In January 1978, the Public Transport Commission invited tenders for 25 high-speed railcars, which were to be broadly similar to Western Australia's Prospector railcars delivered by Comeng in 1971. The tender allowed bidders to suggest alternative types of high-speed train. Comeng submitted a tender for a train based on the British Rail designed HST, which had entered service in the United Kingdom in 1976. During August 1979, Comeng was announced as the successful bidder and, although the tender had called for 100 vehicles, by the time the contract was signed in March 1980, the order was only for 30: 10 power cars and 20 carriages, enough to form four five-carriage trains with two spare power cars.

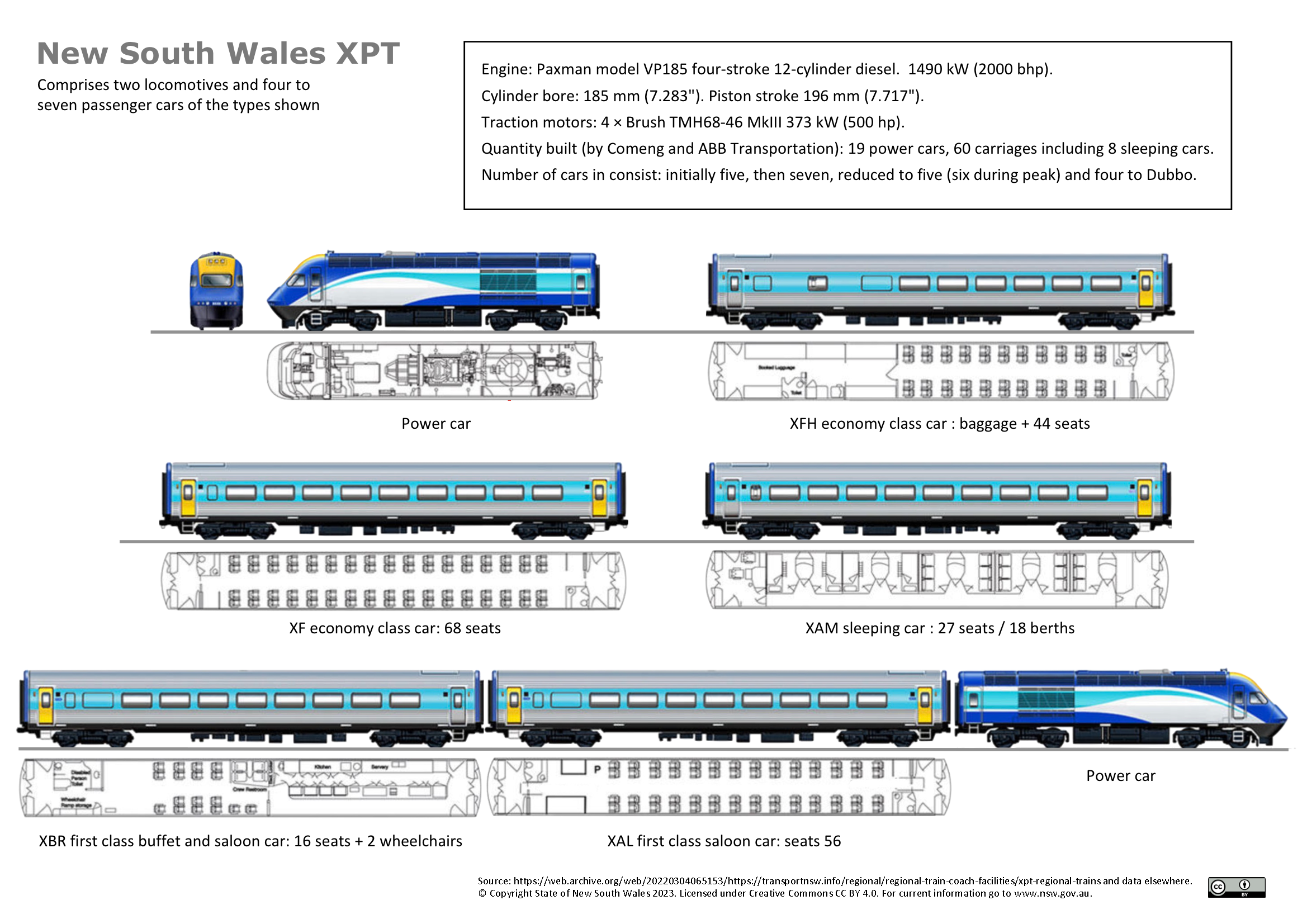
Locomotives and passenger cars of the XPT (click to enlarge)

The High Speed Train design was significantly modified, with the power cars being 50 cm (19.7 in) shorter, the Paxman Valenta engine downrated from 2250 to 2000 bhp (1680 to 1490 kW), gearing lowered for a top operating speed of 160 km/h (100 mph), suspension modified to operate on inferior track, and air filters and a cooling system modified to cater for hotter, dustier Australian conditions. The passenger cars, built to a loading gauge bigger than that of railways in Britain, were based on a Budd design. Nonetheless, the passenger car bogies were based on the British Rail BT10; coaches built later on used a different design, subsequently modified after being found to have a worse ride quality. The XPT is theoretically capable of reaching speeds of 200 km/h (125 mph).

During August 1981, the first power car and trailer commenced testing with a stainless steel luggage van. On a demonstration run to Albury on 6 September 1981, the XPT set a new Australian rail speed record of 183 km/h between Table Top and Gerogery in southern NSW, breaking that set by the Western Australian Government Railways' Prospector railcar in 1971. On a test run to Albury on 18 September 1992, the XPT reached 193 km/h between Table Top and Yerong Creek. This record was broken by Queensland Rail's Electric Tilt Train in May 1999.

=== In service ===
XP2008, in the original State Rail Authority livery, in Melbourne, 1990

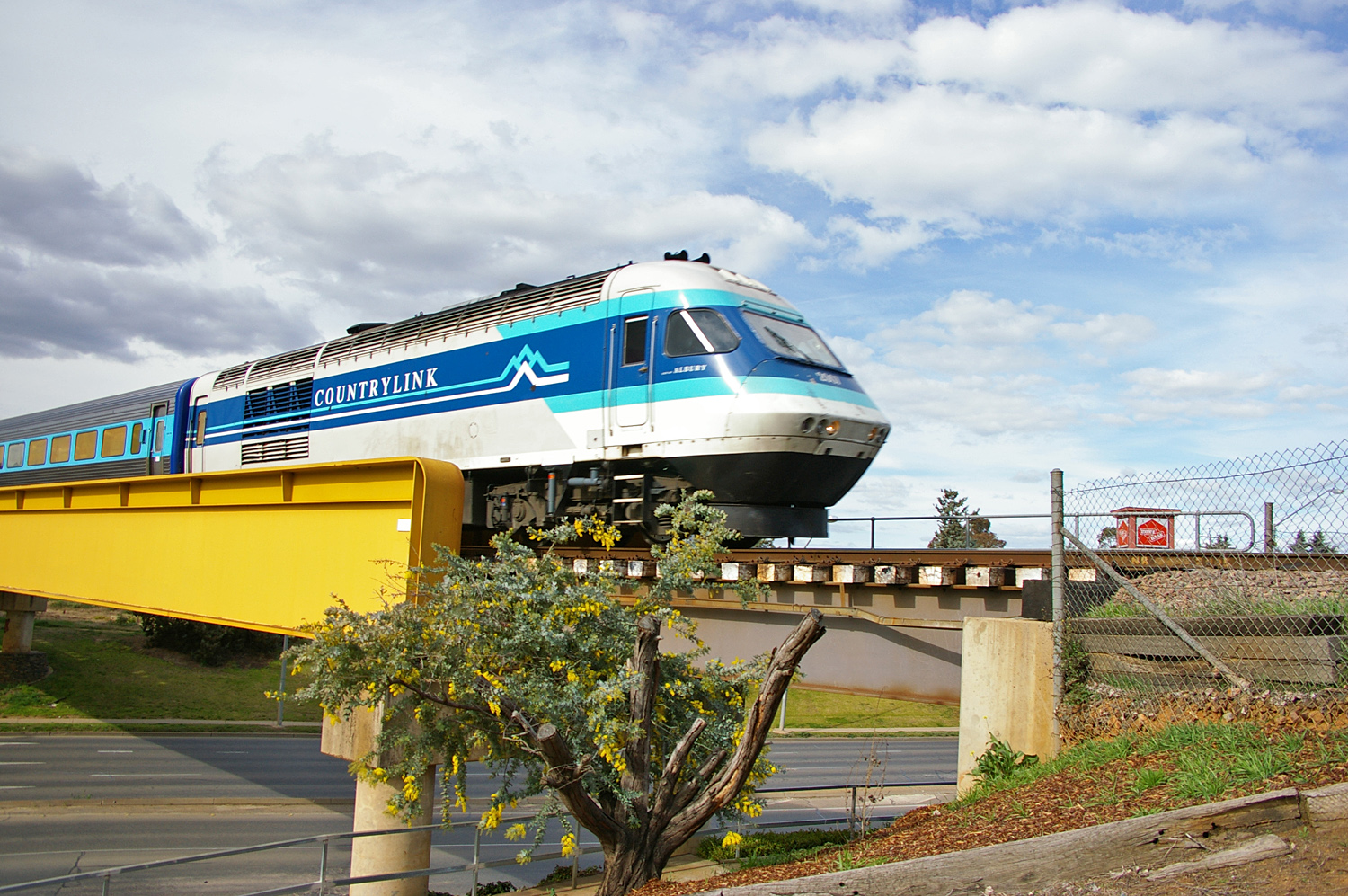
XP2007, in the original CountryLink livery, in Wagga Wagga, 2008

In January 1982, the first full test XPT set started running. The first four sets entered service on the Central West XPT to Dubbo during April 1982, the Mid North Coast XPT to Kempsey in May 1982 and the Riverina XPT to Albury in August 1982. The XPT cut one hour and 54 minutes off the travel time from Sydney to Dubbo.

In 1983, a further five power cars and 15 trailers were ordered; these allowed the Canberra XPT to commence in August 1983 followed by the Northern Tablelands XPT to Glen Innes and Tenterfield (two times per week only) in June 1984. The XPT cut 50 minutes off the trip between Sydney and Canberra. By tightening up the diagrams, an overnight South XPT to Albury was introduced, but was withdrawn in June 1985 due to low patronage. During 1985, an additional 12 trailer carriages were ordered to allow six sets of 7 carriages to be formed. From October 1985, the Mid North Coast XPT to Kempsey ceased, being replaced by the Holiday Coast XPT to Grafton. The Northern Tablelands XPT also was cut back to Armidale and only ran on alternate days with a HUB/RUB set operating on the other days.

Initially, the XPT carried a fare surcharge compared to parallel locomotive hauled services; however this charge was abolished from May 1985.

It was proposed to extend operations to Melbourne with costs to be shared with V/Line. A five-carriage promotional train ran to Melbourne on 17 February 1985, running four free return shuttles to Tullamarine Loop. Crew training commenced on the North East line between Albury and Benalla in July 1985 with services scheduled to commence on 3 August, but agreement could not be reached with the Australian Federated Union of Locomotive Employees over crewing and the plan was shelved. Another promotional train ran to Melbourne in November 1990.

Following the election of the Greiner government in March 1988, consultants Booz Allen Hamilton were commissioned to prepare a report into NSW rail services. On purely economic grounds, the report recommended closing all country passenger services as they were judged unviable; however this was not politically acceptable. If services were to be maintained, the report recommended operating a reduced rail service, all with XPTs.

During February 1990, both the Brisbane Limited and Pacific Coast Motorail were withdrawn and replaced by XPT services to Brisbane and Murwillumbah. To provide rolling stock for these, the Canberra XPT was withdrawn and replaced by a locomotive hauled train and the Northern Tablelands Express was truncated to become a day return service to Tamworth.

In June 1990, the government announced that it would purchase a fleet of Xplorers to reintroduce services to Armidale and Moree. When these were introduced in October 1993, the Northern Tablelands XPT ceased and the stock replaced a locomotive hauled set on a service to Grafton.

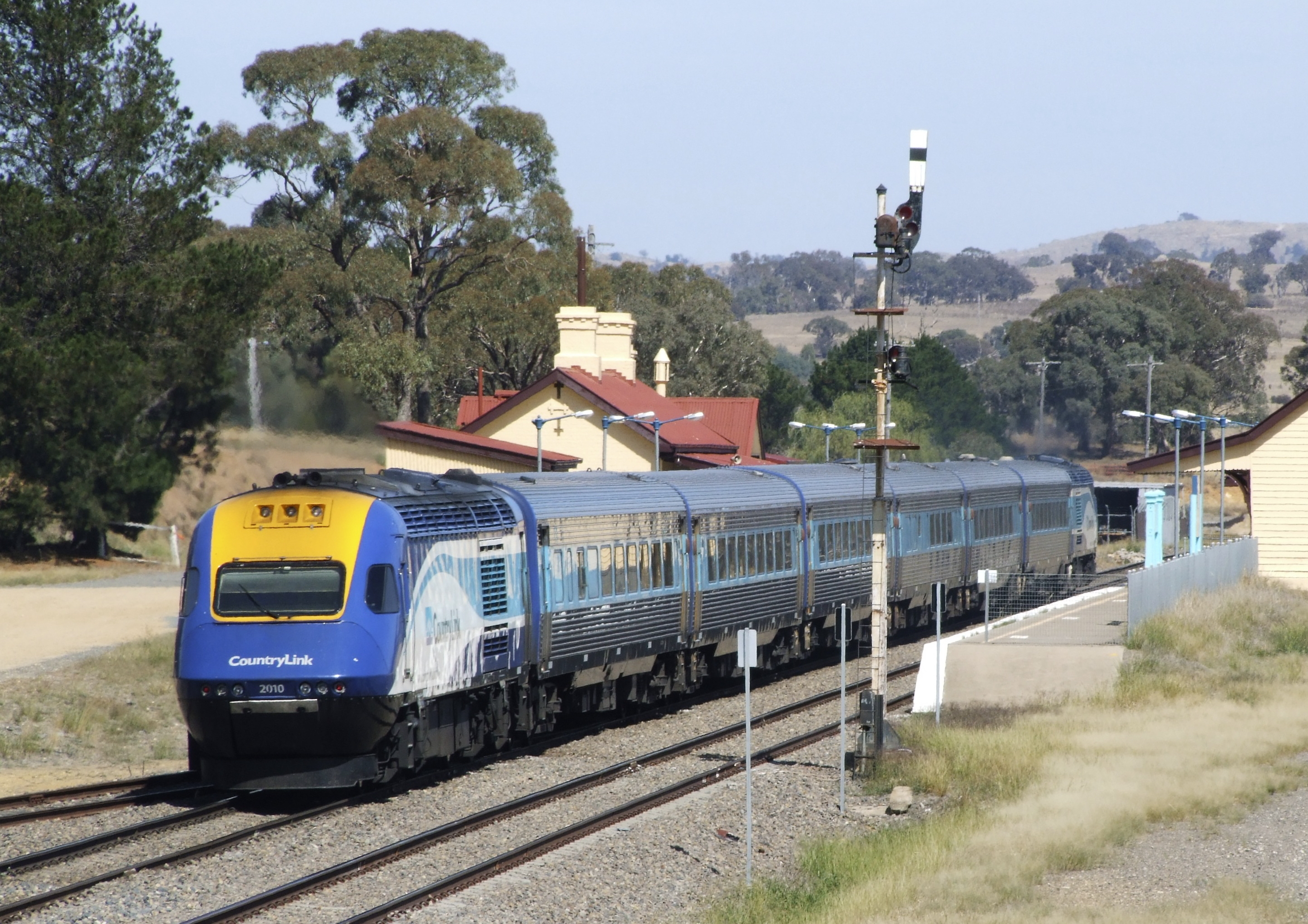
XPT in the second CountryLink livery at Gunning, 2009

During October 1990, the government announced that eight sleeper carriages would be ordered for use on overnight services to Brisbane, Murwillumbah and Melbourne. These were included in an order placed with ABB in 1991 for four power cars and 13 trailers that was jointly funded by the New South Wales and Victorian governments. At the same time, the earlier stock was repainted in CountryLink livery. The power cars were repainted by Clyde Engineering at Kelso while the carriages were done in Breemar.

In November 1993, XPTs replaced locomotive-hauled stock on the overnight Sydney/Melbourne Express. In December 1994, an XPT daylight service to Melbourne was introduced by extending the Riverina XPT from Albury. The XPTs reduced the travel time to Melbourne by up to two hours.

During 1995, CountryLink trialled three Swedish Railways X2000 tilting train carriages. After conducting a statewide tour in March, they were used on Canberra services from 23 April until 18 June 1995 with modified XPT power cars XP2000 and XP2009.

Starting in 2003, an XPT has operated a service each January to Parkes for the Parkes Elvis Festival. Following the closure of the Murwillumbah line, the XPT service was cut back to Casino from May 2004. During October 2013, using a set that had been isolated west of Lithgow by bushfires, it was deployed on the Outback Xplorer service to Broken Hill.

=== Potential export sale ===
During 1986, an agreement was reached to build a fleet of XPTs for the State Railway of Thailand. To allow the train to be built to the narrower 1,000 mm (3 ft 3 3/8 in) metre gauge while retaining the same fuel capacity, it was proposed to extend the power cars by 2.7 to 20 metres (8 ft 10 in to 65 ft 7 in) and mount them on Bo′Bo′Bo′ bogies. The negotiations were sufficiently advanced for the Prime Minister of Thailand to announce the agreement on television, however the Australian Department of Trade withdrew its support at the last moment and the deal fell through.

=== Accidents and incidents ===
==== Henty derailment ====
On 3 May 1991, an XPT power car derailed at Henty, injuring the driver and six passengers.

==== Gerogery accident ====
On 27 January 2001, an XPT collided with a car on a level crossing in the Gerogery level crossing accident. Five people in the car were killed, and the train was derailed.

==== Wallan derailment ====
On 20 February 2020, a Sydney to Melbourne-bound XPT derailed at Wallan, killing the train driver and the pilot, and injuring twelve. The leading power car, XP2018, was rebuilt as XP2019, re-entering service in February 2023. Two carriages were written off.

=== Replacement ===
In October 2016, the NSW government announced the XPTs would be replaced as part of the Regional Train Project. Two months later, it was announced that several different train manufacturers had been shortlisted to supply the replacement trains. During February 2019, a contract with the Spanish rolling stock manufacturer Construcciones y Auxiliar de Ferrocarriles (CAF) was signed for a new fleet of bi-mode Civity trains, now known as the New South Wales R set; these are to replace the XPTs. Originally scheduled to enter service sometime in 2023, the Civity fleet has been delayed, allegedly due to requested design changes. The government has not ruled out retaining XPTs after the introduction of the new trains.

In February 2025, the NSW government announced a $40.3 million life extension project to refurbish the XPT power cars and carriages. The refurbishment saw the Grafton service suspended for a year. For its resumption on 28 April 2026, XP2006 and XP2009, alongside six carriages, were painted in their original colours.

== Services ==
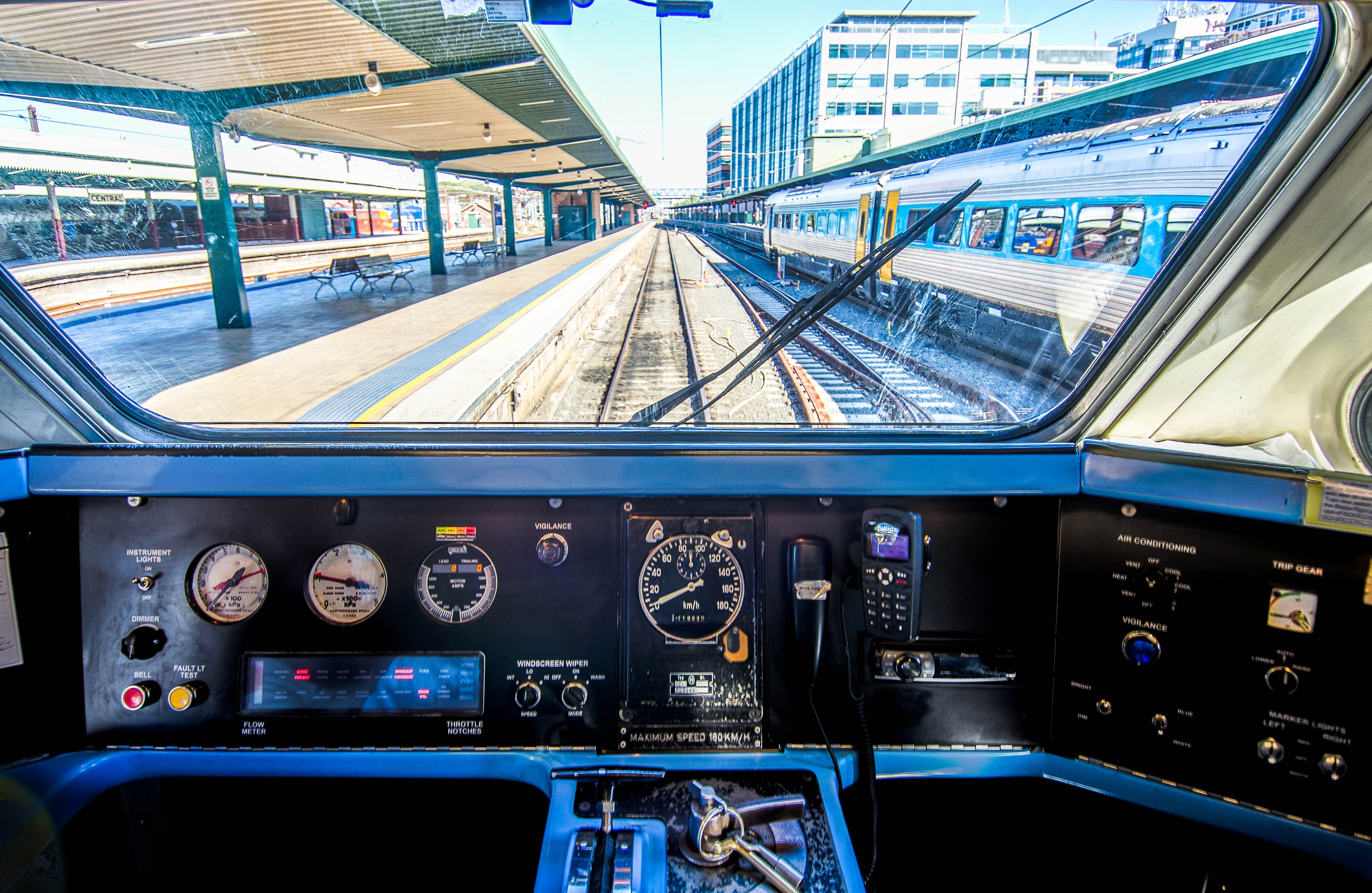
View from the drivers' cabin of an XPT in 2013

The XPT fleet is currently used on services from Sydney to Grafton, Casino, Brisbane, Dubbo and Melbourne. The Central West Express to Dubbo and the Grafton Express pre-dated the XPT fleet, which took over those services.

=== Fleet ===
==== XP power cars ====
A total of 19 XP power cars were built, originally powered by a Paxman Valenta 12RP200L engine with a single turbocharger. These were replaced from June 2000 by more powerful Paxman VP185 12-cylinder engines, which have four low-pressure turbochargers and two high-pressure turbochargers boasting 1,492 kW or 2,001 horsepower. The VP185 had been fitted in some High Speed Trains since 1994. Traction equipment was manufactured by Brush Traction, as with the HST.

The XP power cars were named after cities and towns that the XPT served:

- XP2000: City of Maitland
- XP2001: City of Dubbo
- XP2002: City of Armidale
- XP2003: City of Taree
- XP2004: City of Kempsey
- XP2005: City of Newcastle
- XP2006: City of Wagga Wagga (later City of Grafton)
- XP2007: City of Albury
- XP2008: City of Goulburn
- XP2009: City of Canberra (later City of Murwillumbah, then City of Sydney)
- XP2010: City of Orange
- XP2011: City of Sydney
- XP2012: City of Tamworth
- XP2013: Municipality of Casino
- XP2014: City of Grafton
- XP2015: City of Melbourne (later City of Bathurst)
- XP2016: City of Cootamundra
- XP2017: City of Melbourne
- XP2018 (later XP2019): City of Coffs Harbour

Earlier power cars were built by Comeng, Granville while XP2015–XP2018 were built by ABB, Dandenong. XP2015, originally named City of Melbourne, was renamed City of Bathurst after it led an XPT which broke the Australian rail speed record in 1992; XP2017 received the former's original name in the same year.

After the 2020 Wallan derailment, in which XP2018's driver was killed, it was renumbered XP2019 during rebuilding.

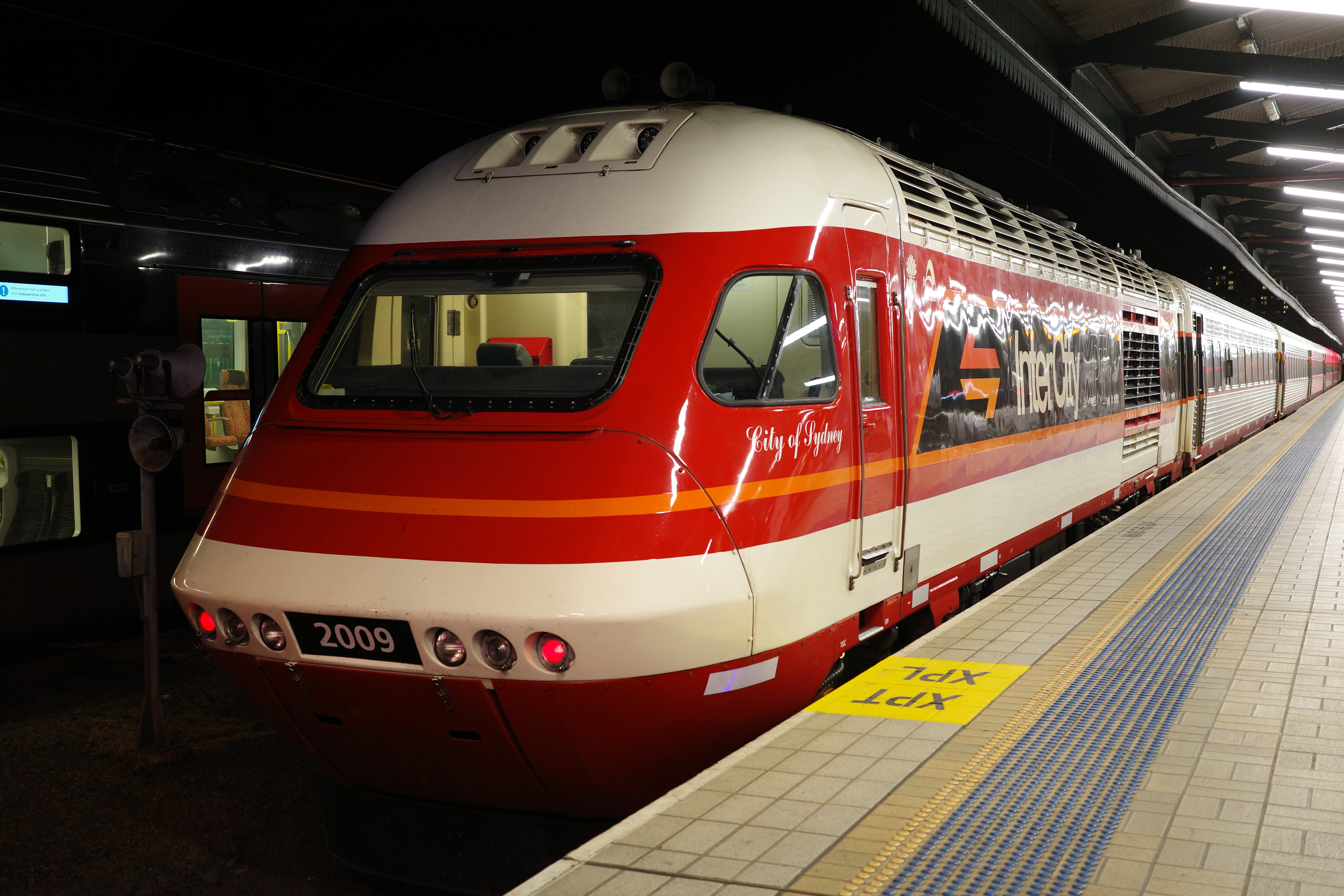
Repainted set at Sydney Central in 2026

In 2026, XP2006 and XP2009, alongside six passenger carriages, were repainted in their original colours. The former received the name City of Grafton and the latter City of Sydney. This was done to commemorate the reinstatement of the Grafton XPT service on 28 April, which had been suspended for a year during the fleet's refurbishment.

==== Carriages ====
The XPT carriages were refurbished between 1992 and 1993, which included their repainting in CountryLink livery. All were refurbished again between 2005 and 2008.

After two carriages were written off after the Wallan derailment in 2020, UGL Rail was contracted to convert two XF economy sitting cars to an XAM sleeper and XBR first buffet, however they were outshopped as a XAMB sleeping carriage and XL first class carriage instead.

As at June 2023, the carriage fleet of 58 carriages comprised

- 7 Sleeping cars: XAM 2175–2178, 2180–2182, XAMB 2183 ('B' for Comeng bogies)
- 8 First class saloon cars XL 2228, 2230–2237
- 8 First class saloon/buffet cars XBR 2150–2156, 2158
- 25 Economy class saloon cars XF 2200–2223
- 9 Economy class saloon/luggage cars XFH 2104–2110, 2112, 2113

=== Operating cycle ===
The Dubbo set is captive and operates a daily return service. The other seven sets rotate on a seven-day repeating cycle, which was reported by Railway Digest in 2002 in accordance with the timetable at the time:

- Day 1: 07:42 Sydney to Melbourne arrives 18:30, forms 19:50 Melbourne to Sydney
- Day 2: arrives Sydney 06:58, forms 11:41 Sydney to Grafton arrives 22:15
- Day 3: 05:15 Grafton to Sydney arrives 15:45, forms 20:42 to Melbourne
- Day 4: arrives in Melbourne 07:30, forms 08:30 to Sydney arrives 19:59
- Day 5: 07:08 Sydney to Casino arrives 18:41, forms 19:30 Casino to Sydney
- Day 6: arrives Sydney 07:01, forms 14:41 Sydney to Brisbane
- Day 7: arrives Brisbane 04:53, forms 05:55 Brisbane to Sydney arrives 20:10

=== Formations ===
Train lengths have varied over time. Initially, all services operated with five carriage sets. Subsequent formations have seen anything from four to seven carriages per set.

=== Depot ===
The XPT fleet is maintained at the XPT Service Centre, located at Meeks Road in Sydenham.

== See also ==
- High-speed rail in Australia
