= Surfers Paradise Transit Centre =

Bus station in Surfers Paradise, Gold Coast, Queensland

General information
- Location: Cnr Gold Coast Highway & Beach Road; Surfers Paradise, Gold Coast
- Coordinates: 28°00′10.34″S 153°25′37.66″E
- Bus operators: Greyhound Australia; NSW TrainLink; Premier Motor Service

Construction
- Accessible: Yes

Other information
- Website: www.the4217.com
Location

The Surfers Paradise Transit Centre is the main coach station on the Gold Coast. It is served by long-distance coach services to Brisbane, Byron Bay, Coffs Harbour, Lismore, Casino and Sydney operated by Greyhound Australia, NSW TrainLink and Premier Motor Service.

No Kinetic Gold Coast local bus services call at the station, with stops nearby on the Gold Coast Highway. The G:link tram also calls in nearby Surfers Paradise Boulevard.

In 2015, the booking hall was redeveloped as a retail centred named The 4217 with food outlets, a restaurant and a gymnasium.
