= Moree railway station =

Railway station in New South Wales, Australia

Moree
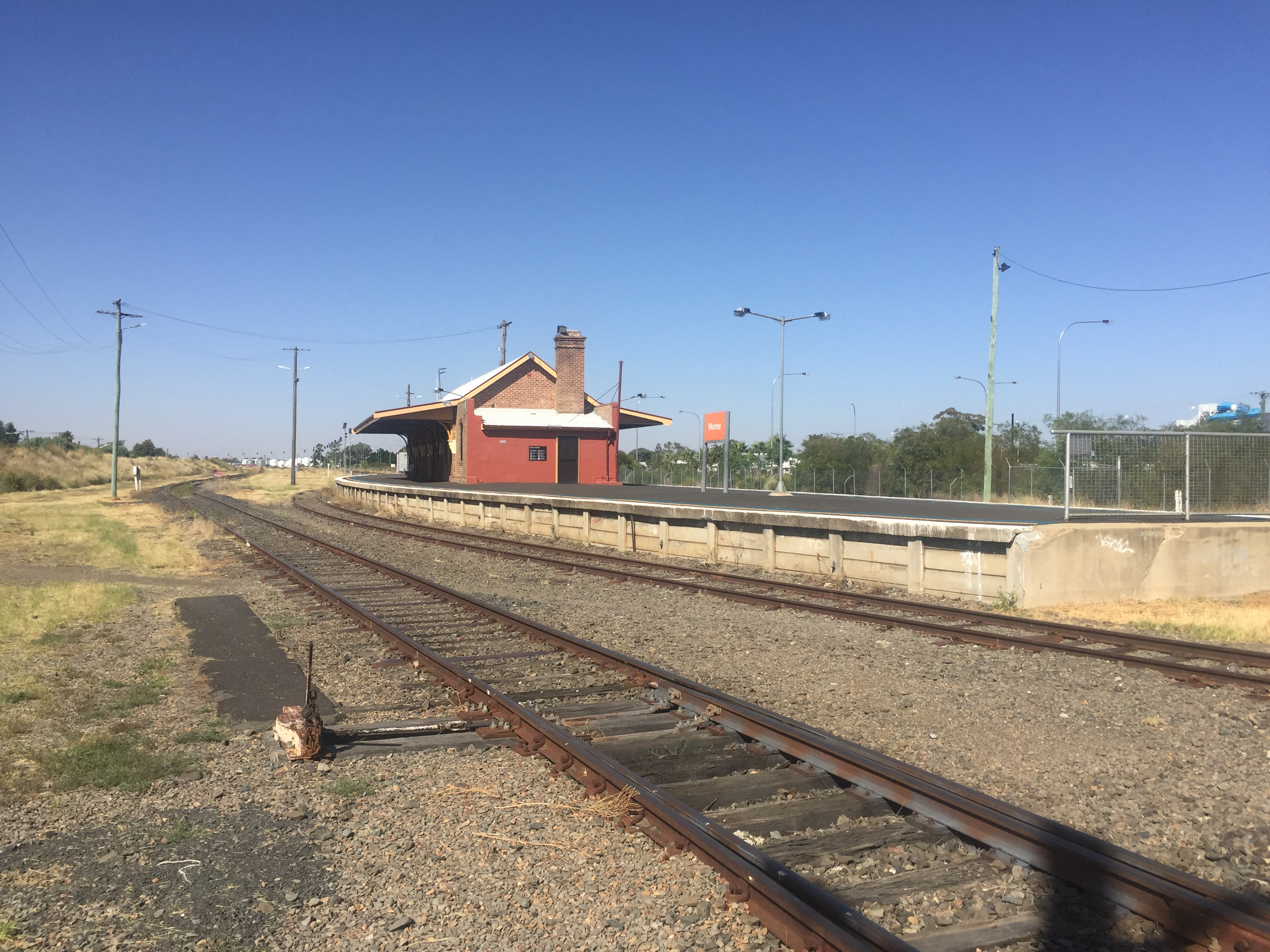
- Southbound view in April 2018

General information
- Location: Gosport Street, Moree; Australia
- Coordinates: 29°28′26″S 149°50′54″E
- Owner: Transport Asset Manager of New South Wales
- Operator: NSW TrainLink
- Lines: Mungindi; Inverell
- Distance: 665.60 kilometres (413.58 mi) from Central
- Platforms: 2 (1 island)

Construction
- Structure type: Ground
- Accessible: Assisted access

Other information
- Status: Weekdays: Staffed: 7am to 11am: Weekends and public holidays: Unstaffed
- Station code: MRZ

History
- Opened: 1904
- Closed: 31 March 2021
- Rebuilt: April–October 2021 due to the ARTC Inland Rail Project

Services
| Preceding station | NSW TrainLink | Following station |
|---|---|---|
| Terminus | NSW TrainLink North Western Line | Bellata towards Sydney |
Former services
| Preceding station | Former services | Following station |
|---|---|---|
| Camurra towards Mungindi | Mungindi Line | Gurley towards Werris Creek |
| Terminus | Inverell Line | Mungie Bungie towards Inverell |
Location

Moree railway station is located on the Mungindi line in New South Wales, Australia. It serves the town of Moree.

== History ==
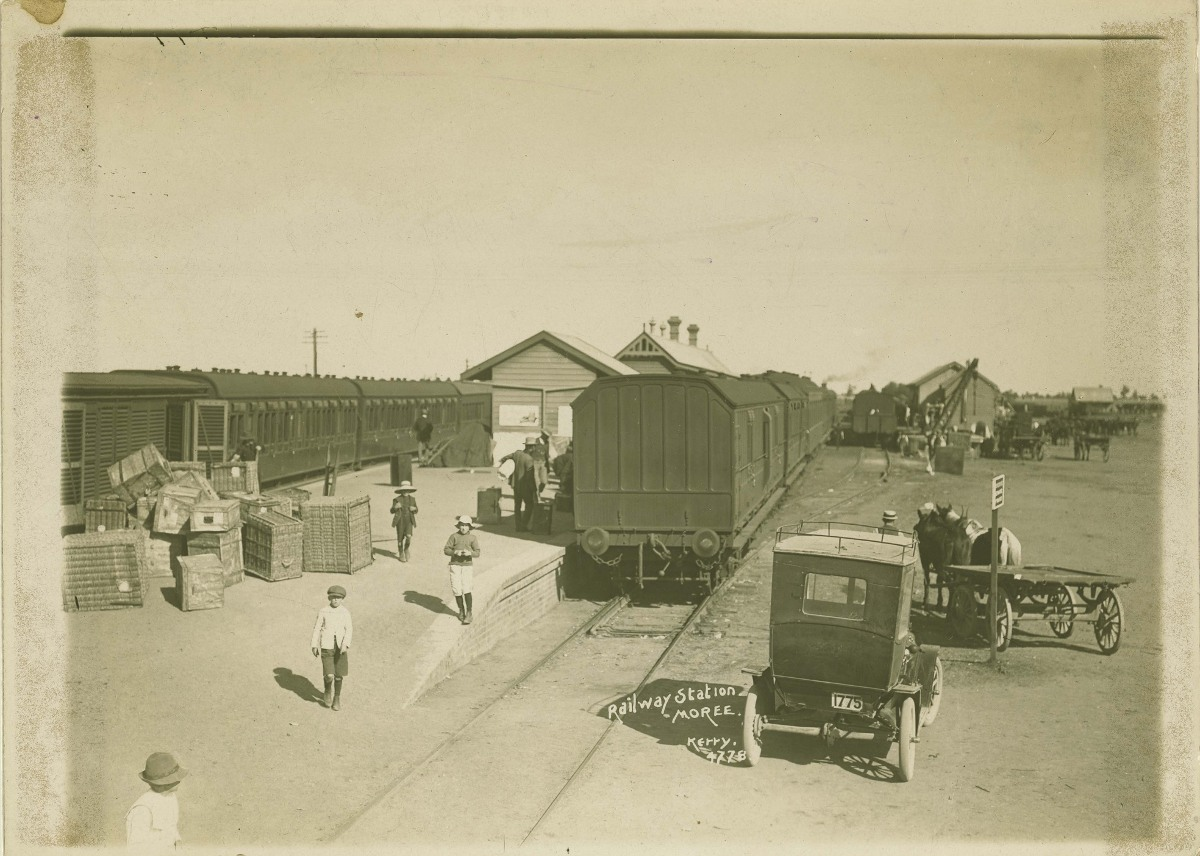
A busy scene at the station c.1911

The current station opened in 1904, replacing the original station located to the north that opened on 1 April 1897 when the line was extended from Boggabri.

It served as the terminus of the line until it was extended to Garah on 29 September 1913 and ultimately Mungindi on 7 December 1914. Moree was also the junction station for the Boggabilla and Inverell lines.

The station is an island platform with two faces. In 2009, a timber building at the southern end of the platform was destroyed by fire.

== Services ==
Moree is served by NSW TrainLink's daily Northern Tablelands Xplorer service operating to and from Sydney. NSW TrainLink also operates a coach service to and from Grafton.

| Platform | Line | Stopping pattern | Notes |
| 1 | North Western Region | services to Sydney Central | |
