= Mungindi railway line =

Railway line in New South Wales, Australia

Overview
- Locale: New South Wales, Australia

Service
- Type: freight; passenger as far as Moree
- Operator: ARTC

Technical
- Track gauge: 1,435 mm (4 ft 8 1/2 in)
- Signalling: Train Order Working north of Turrawan; Centralized traffic control south of Turrawan.
- Train protection system: TMACS north of Turrawan

The Mungindi railway line is a railway line in northern New South Wales, Australia. It branches from the Main North line at Werris Creek station and heads north-west through the towns of Gunnedah and Narrabri before reaching Moree which for many years was the railhead before the extension to Mungindi was constructed. The line is currently truncated to Weemelah between Moree and Mungindi. Passenger trains still operate to Moree, and goods trains (mainly wheat) operate to Camurra. As of 1 September 2009, services have been suspended between Camurra and Weemelah. The line between Werris Creek and Moree is also known as the North-West line.

== History ==
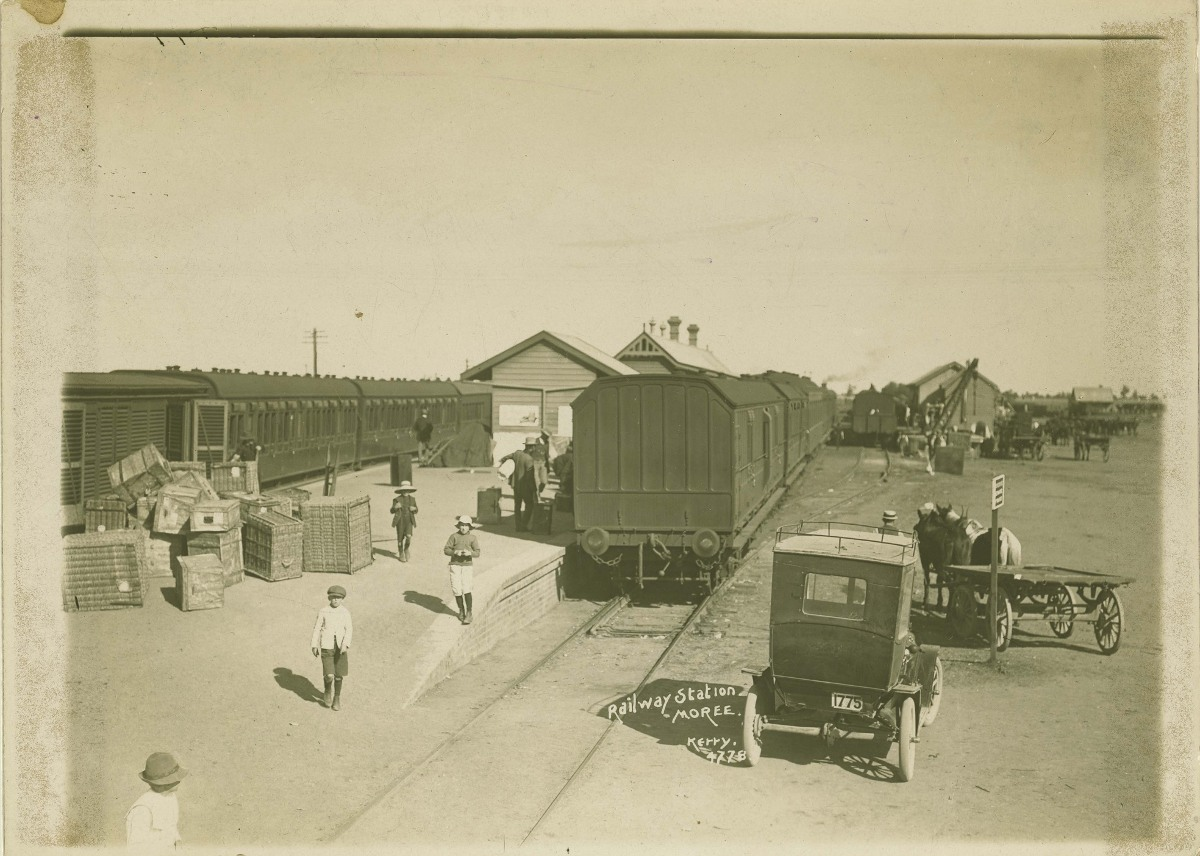
Moree station c.1911

The line opened from Werris Creek to Gunnedah in 1879, Narrabri in 1884 and Moree in 1897. Moree was for many years the railhead for the large sheep stations in the area, however the construction by the Queensland Government of a railway close to the NSW border prompted the construction of a line from Moree to Mungindi, which is on the state border. The line opened in 1914, and effectively became considered an extension of the mainline from Werris Creek. The line traverses the black soil plains of the area, much of which are devoted to sheep grazing. In 1974, the line north of Weemelah was cut by flooding and the line was thus truncated at this location. On 1 September 2009, services were suspended between Camurra and Weemalah, however the decision was reversed in November 2009 when the line reopened in February 2010 after approximately 2,500 sleepers were replaced.

== Branches ==
A branch line was opened from Moree to Inverell in 1901, with proposals to extend it to Glen Innes, Grafton and Iluka at one time, but nothing came of this plan. This line closed in 1994. A branch line was opened between Camurra (11 km (6.8 mi) north of Moree) to North Star, New South Wales and Boggabilla in 1932. It is now closed beyond North Star. Another branch was opened from Narrabri to Burren in 1903 and it was extended to Cryon in 1905 and Walgett in 1908. This line is still open for freight only as far as Walgett wheat terminal. In 1906, a branch was opened from Burren Junction to Pokataroo. The last 16 km (9.9 mi) of the line was closed past Merrywinebone in 1974, when it was damaged by floods. It is now only open for grain traffic.

== Passenger service ==
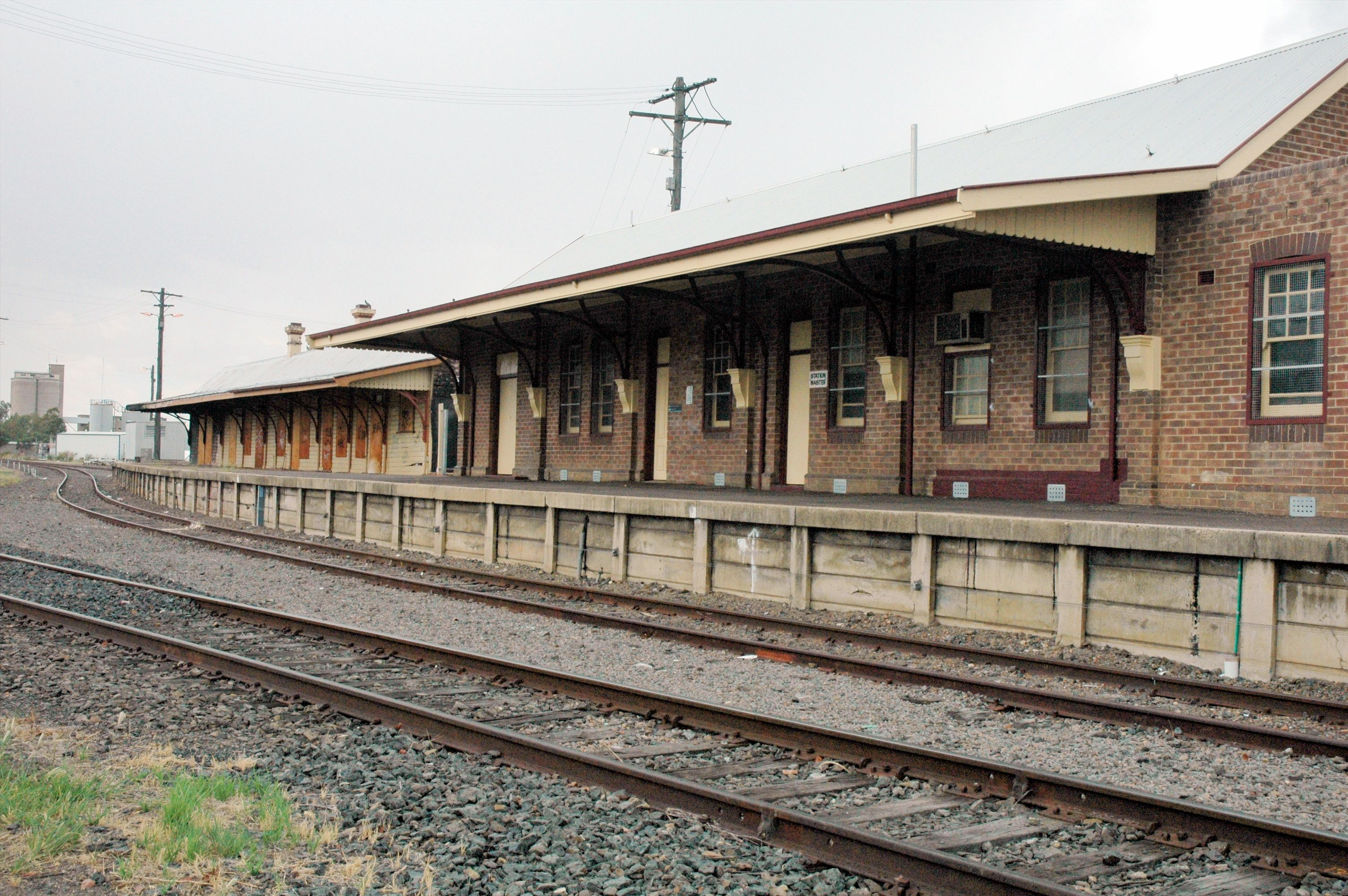
Moree station, February 2007

A daily NSW TrainLink Xplorer operates between Werris Creek (from Sydney) and Moree.

Until its cessation in November 1988, the overnight North West Mail served Moree. Between 1926 and 1974, CPH railmotors provided a passenger service between Moree and Mungindi, connecting with the North West Mail, usually three times per week.

In June 1959, an extension of the Northern Tablelands Express to Moree was introduced, operated by DEB set railcars. In June 1984, the service was taken over by XPTs and renamed the Northern Tablelands XPT, with a DEB set connection between Werris Creek and Moree.

In February 1990, the rail service was replaced by a road coach service. In 1993, the road coach service was replaced by an Xplorer DMU, initially operating to Tamworth on a day return but, upon delivery of sufficient rolling stock, direct services were provided to Armidale and Moree, that once again divided at Werris Creek.

== Future ==
There are proposals to connect Queensland Rail's South-Western line from a point near Goondiwindi to North Star, either with a bogie exchange or dual gauge to Moree or Narrabri. There are also proposals to extend the standard gauge to Toowoomba railway station and Brisbane and/or Gladstone. In 2008, CTC is being extended as far as Narrabri primarily for coal traffic.

== See also ==
- Inland Rail
- Rail transport in New South Wales
