= New South Wales Xplorer =

Class of diesel multiple unit trains

Xplorer
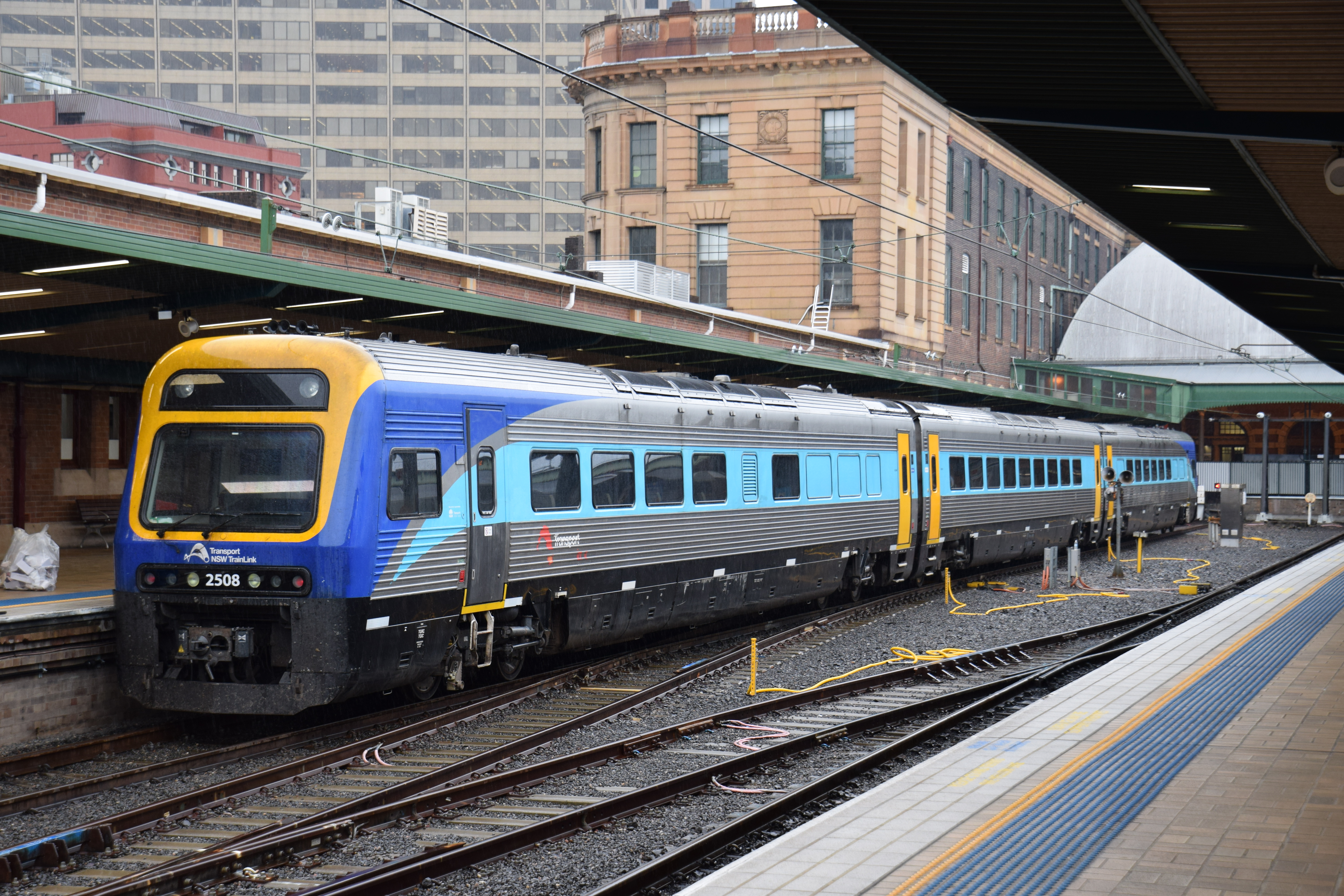
- 2508, 2514 and 2523 at Central station

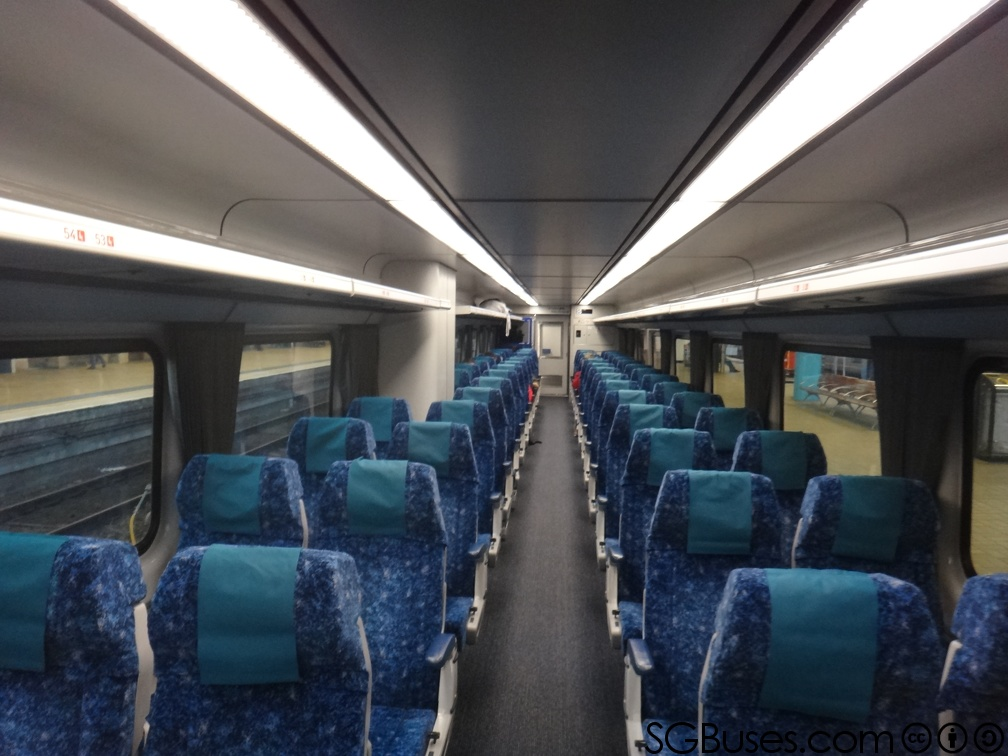
- Refurbished economy class carriage
- Stock type: Diesel multiple unit
- In service: 1993–present
- Manufacturer: ABB
- Built at: Dandenong, Victoria
- Entered service: 4 October 1993
- Number built: 23 carriages (originally 21)
- Successor: R set
- Formation: 2, 3 or 4 cars: EA–EC; EA–EB–EC; EA–EB–EB–EC
- Fleet numbers: EA 2501–2508; EB 2511–2517; EC 2521–2528
- Capacity: 42 First (EA); 66 Economy (EB); 38 Economy (EC)
- Operator: NSW TrainLink
- Depot: Xplorer-Endeavour Service Centre
- Lines served: Broken Hill; Main Northern; Main Western; Main Southern

Specifications
- Train length: 2-car: 50.5 m (165 ft 8 in); 3-car: 75.75 m (248 ft 6 in); 4-car: 101 m (331 ft 4 in)
- Car length: 25.25 m (82 ft 10 in)
- Width: 2,921 mm (9 ft 7 in)
- Height: 4.11 m (13 ft 6 in)
- Maximum speed: 160 km/h (99 mph) (design); 145 km/h (90 mph) (service)
- Weight: 57 t (56 long tons; 63 short tons)
- Prime mover: Cummins KTA–19R (one per car)
- Power output: 383 kW (514 hp) per car
- Transmission: Voith Turbo T311r KB260
- Auxiliaries: Cummins LT10R(G) – 135 kW (181 hp)
- Bogies: PJA (Power), NJA (Trailer)
- Coupling system: Scharfenberg
- Track gauge: 1,435 mm (4 ft 8 1/2 in) standard gauge

Th Xplorers are a type of diesel multiple unit (DMU) trains built by ABB and operated around New South Wales. Initially entering service in October 1993 with CountryLink, the Xplorers are mechanically identical to the Endeavour railcars, though feature a higher level of passenger amenity. All 23 carriages were built in the Dandenong rolling stock factory. The Xplorers currently operate under NSW TrainLink, running on the regional Main North, Main Western and Main Southern lines throughout New South Wales.

== History ==
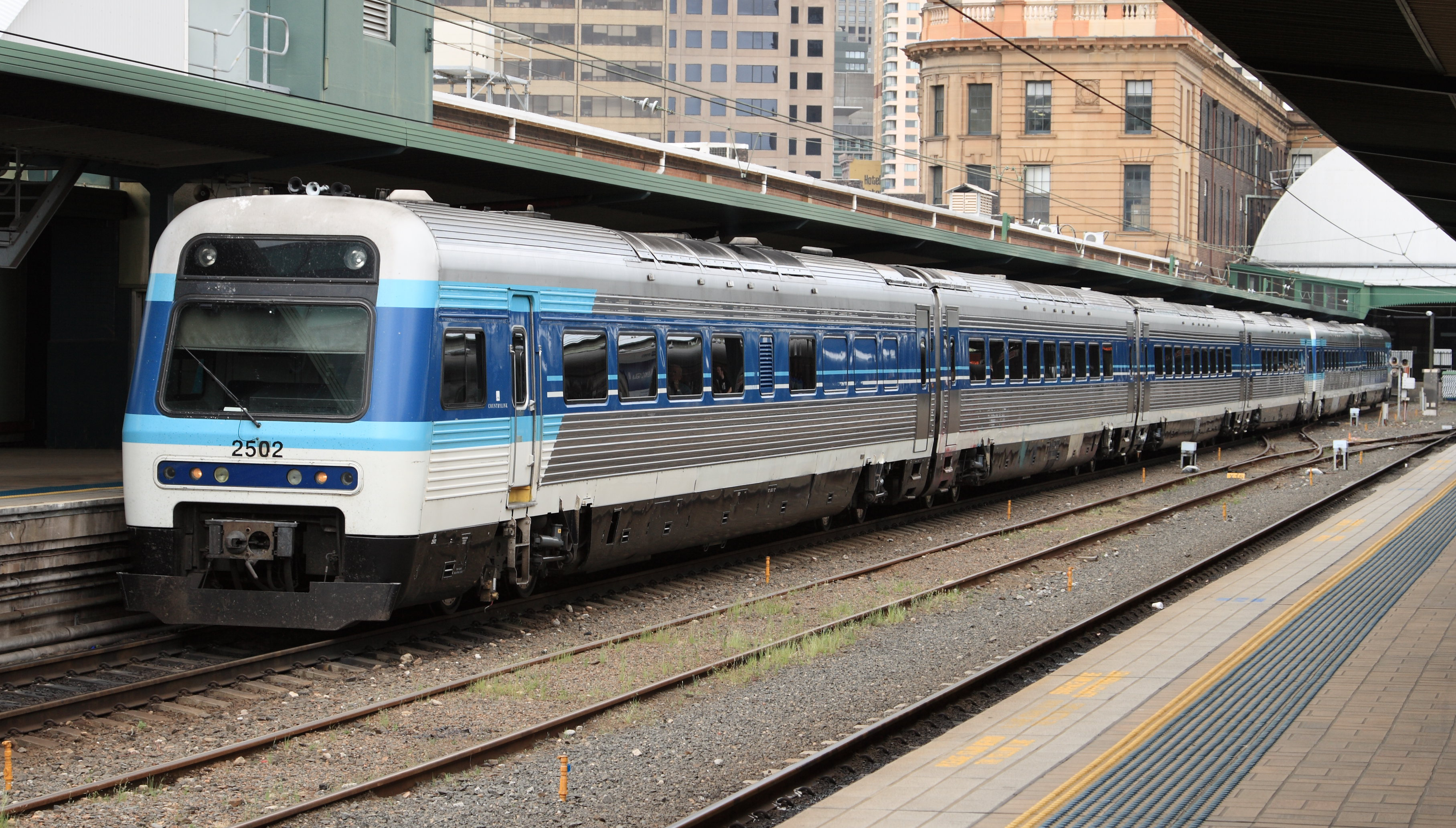
Xplorer 2502 at Sydney Central in original CountryLink livery

Following the election of the Greiner Government in March 1988, consulting firm Booz Allen Hamilton was commissioned to prepare a report into NSW rail services. On purely economic grounds, the report recommended closing all country passenger services as they were judged unviable, however this was not politically acceptable. If services were to be maintained, the report recommended an 'all XPT' option supported by an expanded coach network.

This option was taken up by the government and a new timetable introduced in February 1990. One of the casualties was the Northern Tablelands Express from Sydney to Armidale which was operated on alternate days by a locomotive hauled HUB/RUB set and XPT. This was truncated back to Tamworth allowing it to be operated by one XPT as a day return service. A road coach from Sydney to Armidale was introduced. Another service to be replaced by coach was the Werris Creek to Moree connecting service that was operated by a DEB set.

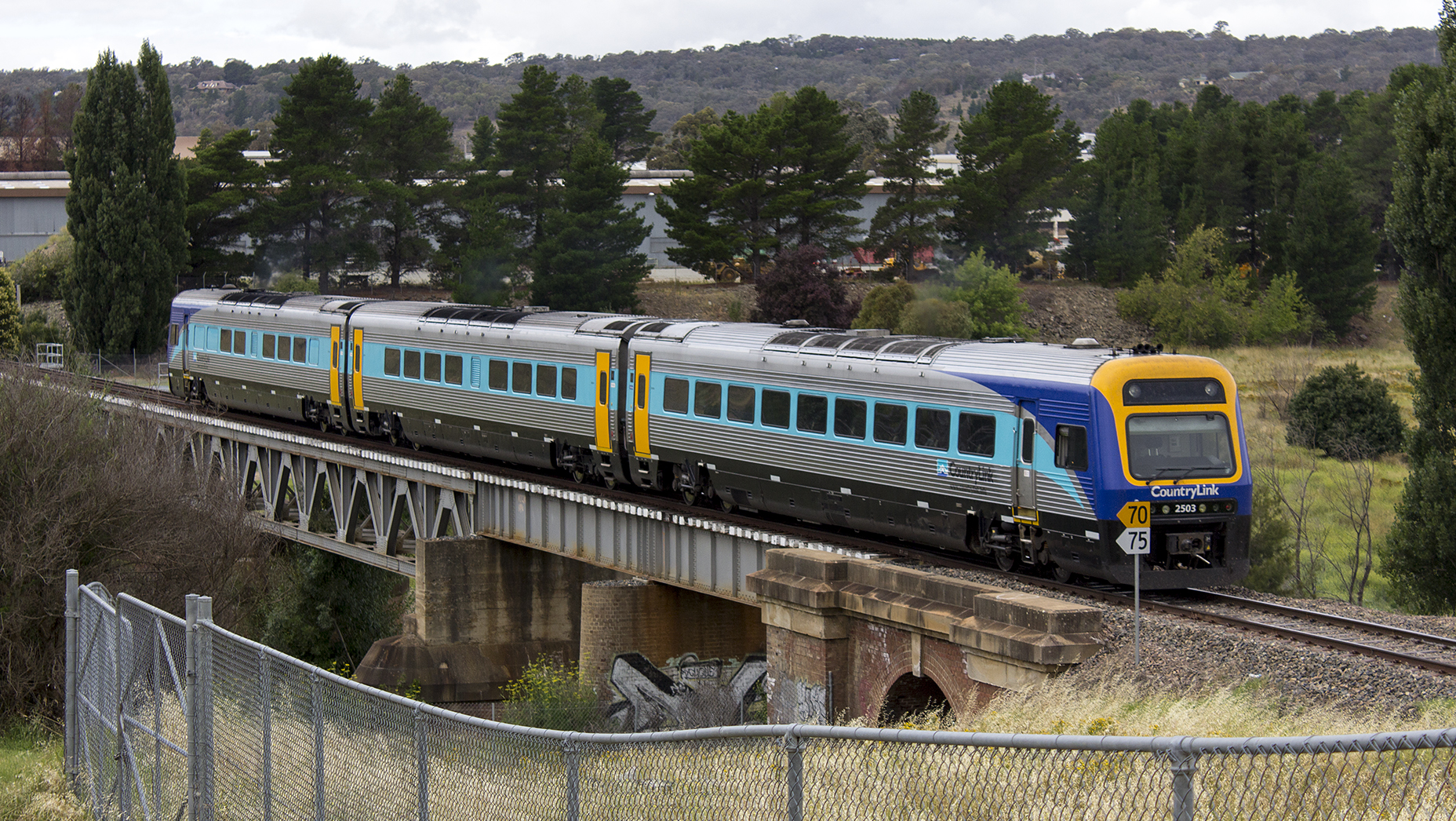
Xplorer at Queanbeyan River in refurbished CountryLink Livery

After suffering a number of losses in northern NSW electorates where services were cut during the March 1990 Federal Election, ensuring a decisive majority for the Hawke Labor government, the National Party decided a policy reversal was needed. In June 1990, the government announced that it would purchase 17 Xplorer carriages to reintroduce services to Armidale and Moree and replace locomotive hauled stock and coaches on services to Canberra. This would release an XPT to operate a daily service to Grafton. The Xplorers entered service on the North Western service in October 1993 and on the Canberra service in December 1993. In November 1994, the government ordered a further four Xplorer carriages.

From May 2000, Xplorers took over the weekly services to Griffith and Broken Hill.

All are scheduled to be replaced by the R sets. A contract with CAF was signed in February 2019, with the Xplorers to be replaced from 2027.

== Service ==
The Xplorers currently operate on these services out of Sydney:

- Armidale and Moree: the Northern Tablelands Express daily service runs along the Main North line to Werris Creek where the train divides. One portion continues on the Main North line and proceeds to Armidale, while the other transfers onto the Mungindi line to Moree. The Armidale portion normally consists of three carriages and the Moree portion two. During times of high demand these can be built up to four and three carriages respectively.
- Canberra: 3 services each direction per day, running along the Main Southern and Bombala lines. Normally operated by a three carriage set but during times of high demand these can be built up to four.
- Griffith: service is attached to a Canberra Xplorer service until Goulburn on Saturdays and Wednesdays only, and operates to Griffith via the Main Southern, Hay and Yanco-Griffith lines. Service returns on Sundays and Thursdays joining an Xplorer from Canberra at Goulburn although on occasions when either train runs late, each will run separately to Sydney. Normally operated by two or three carriages.
- Broken Hill: the Outback Xplorer service runs along the Main Western and Broken Hill lines to Broken Hill. Outbound service operates Monday, returning Tuesday. Normally operated by three carriages.

== Carriages ==
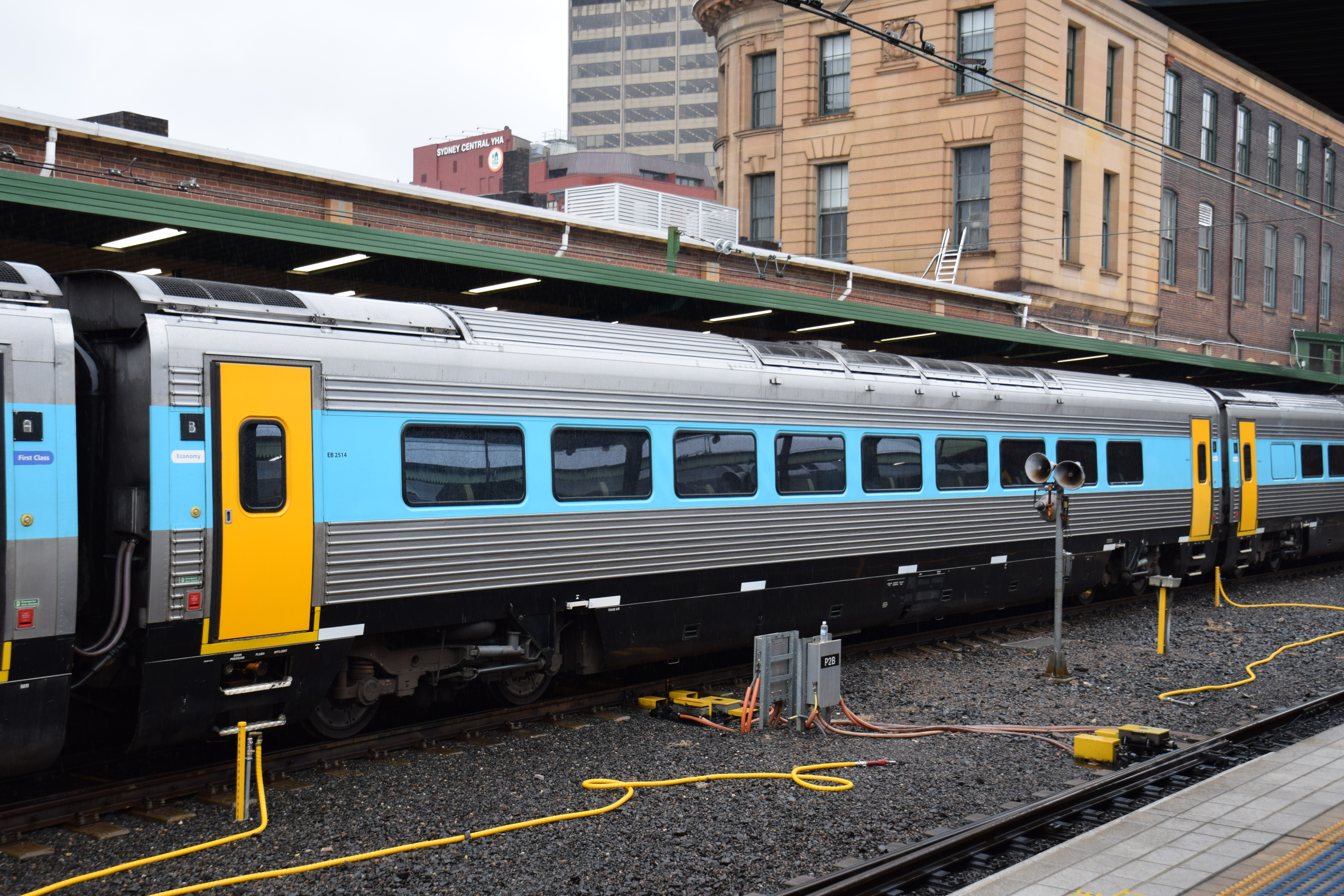
Xplorer carriages

Coding for the carriages are as follows:

- EA First Class Driving Power Car: First Class seating, Buffet and Satellite Telephone. Capacity 42 passengers.
- EB Economy Class Intermediate Power Car: Economy Class seating and Toilet. Capacity 66 Passengers.
- EC Economy Class Driving Power Car: Economy Class seating, Disabled toilet with baby change facilities, wheelchair space and booked Luggage space. Capacity 38 passengers.

Carriage numbering is as follows:

- EA 2501–2508
- EB 2511–2517
- EC 2521–2528

EA 2508 and EC 2528 used to be Endeavour railcars LE 2815 and TE 2865. They became available following the electrification of the South Coast line from Dapto to Kiama in 2001, and were converted to Xplorers by Bombardier Transportation, Dandenong. The conversion of these two vehicles enabled the reintroduction of a rail service to Broken Hill as the Outback Xplorer, originally known as the Silver City Xplorer.

Each car is powered by a Cummins KTA-19R diesel engine rated at 383 kW (514 hp) at 1800rpm coupled to a Voith T311r hydraulic transmission driving both axles on one bogie via Voith Turbo V15/19 final drives. The transmission incorporates a Voith KB260/r hydrodynamic brake. This traction package gives the Xplorer a maximum speed of 160 km/h (99 mph) but in service this is limited to 145 km/h (90 mph). An auxiliary 135 kW (181 hp) Cummins LT10R(G) diesel engine drives a Newage Stamford UCI274F alternator to supply power for the air conditioning and lighting.

=== Refurbishment ===
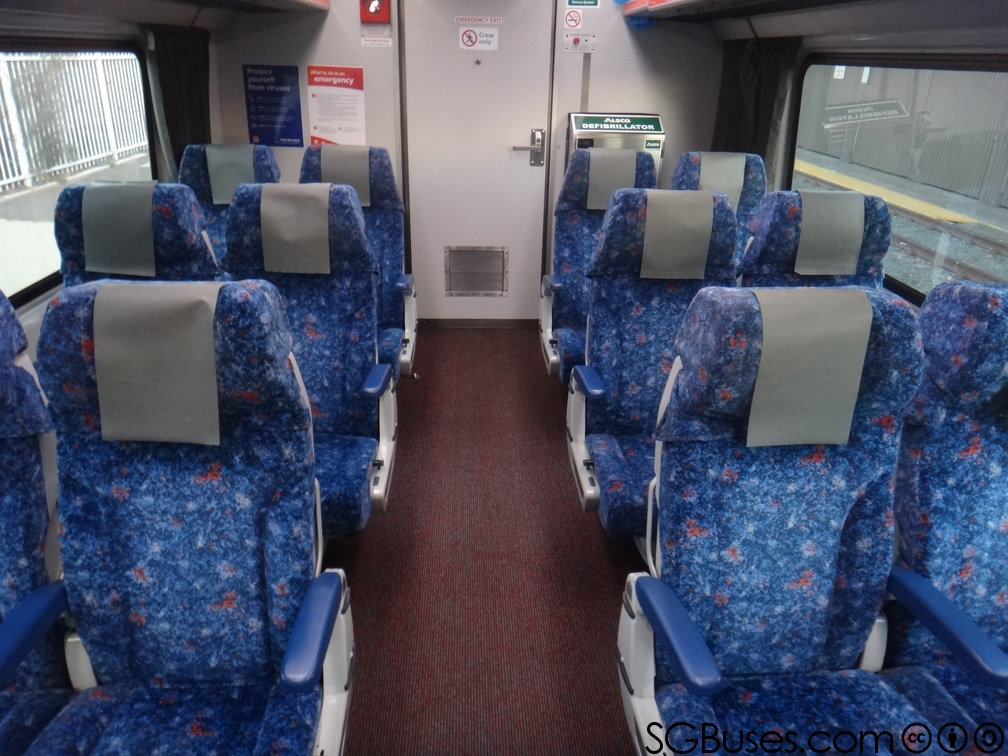
Refurbished first class carriage

In October 2006, RailCorp issued a tender for the refurbishment of the Xplorers and the Endeavour railcars. The contract specified new seating, buffet upgrades, new carpets, toilet upgrades, DVA upgrades, extended booked luggage section, and more wheelchair spaces for the trains. Bombardier Transportation, Downer Rail and United Group Rail responded, with Bombardier being the successful bidder. All units were repainted into new CountryLink colours. The refurbishment started in mid-2007 and concluded at the end of 2008. After the creation of NSW TrainLink, the CountryLink branding was removed from the trains.
