= Braefield, New South Wales =

Braefield
- Town
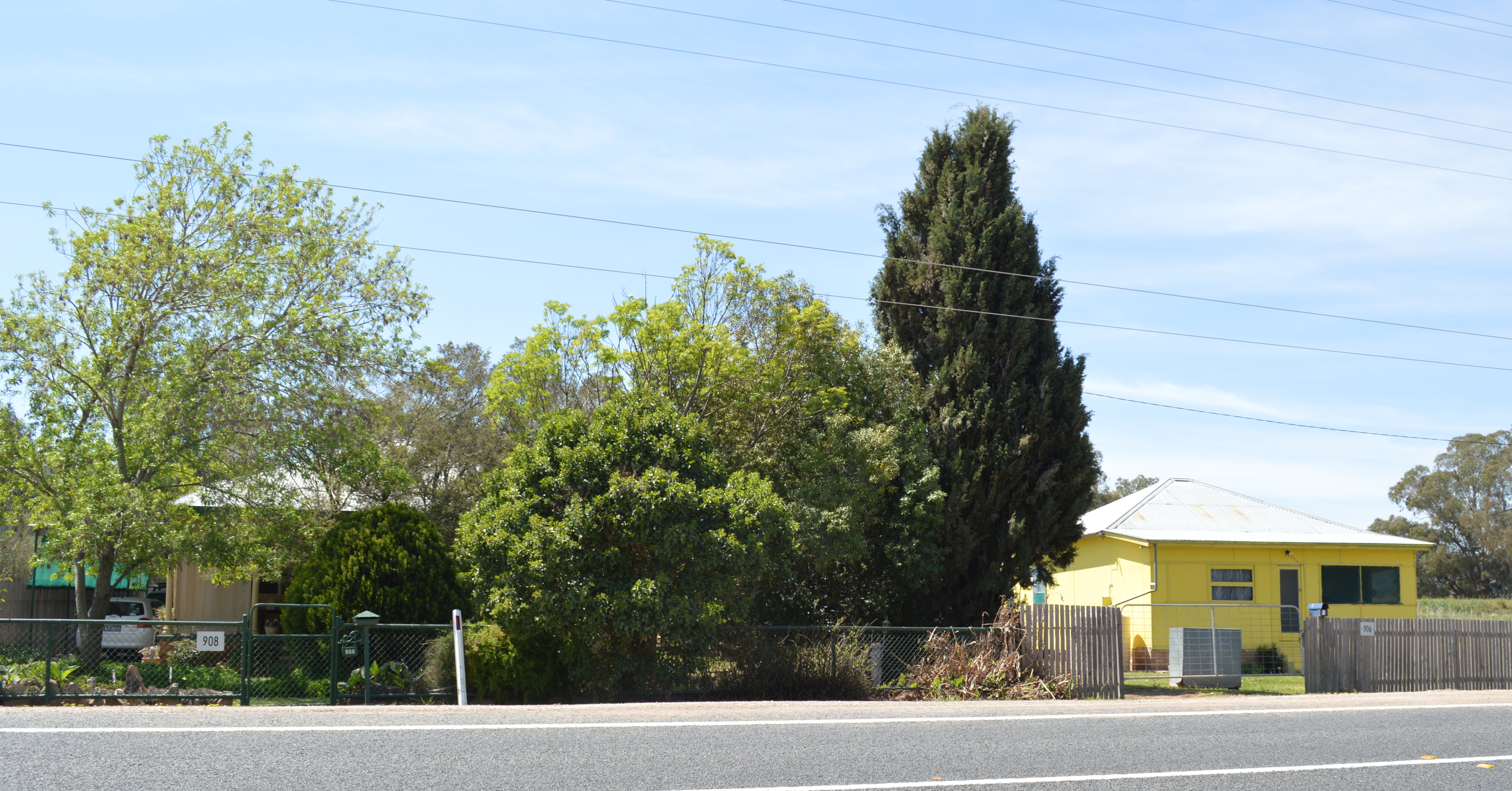
- Houses fronting the Kamilaroi Highway at Braefield

- Coordinates: 31°33′S 150°41′E
- Country: Australia
- State: New South Wales
- Region: North West Slopes
- LGA: Liverpool Plains Shire
- Location: 343 km (213 mi) NW of Sydney; 7 km (4.3 mi) S of Quirindi; 220 km (140 mi) NW of Newcastle

Government
  - State electorate: Upper Hunter
  - Federal division: New England
- Elevation: 388 m (1,273 ft)

Population
  - Total: 62 (2016 census)
- Postcode: 2339
- County: Buckland
- Parish: Quirindi
Localities around Braefield
Quirindi
Braefield	Wallabadah
Willow Tree

Braefield is a locality on the Main North railway line and Kamilaroi Highway in northern New South Wales, Australia. The station opened in 1878, and no trace now remains.

Preceding station	Former services	Following station
Quirindi towards Wallangarra	Main Northern Line	Willow Tree towards Sydney
