= Parraweena, New South Wales =

Parraweena New South Wales
- Population: 61 (SAL 2021)
- Postcode(s): 2339
- LGA(s): Liverpool Plains Shire
- State electorate(s): Tamworth
- Federal division(s): New England
Suburbs around Parraweena:
Blackville		Quirindi
	Parraweena

Parraweena is a rural locality in the state of New South Wales, Australia. At the 2021 Census, it had a population of 61.

Parraweena is located in the Liverpool Plains area, and it is about 35 kilometres WSW of the nearest significant town, Quirindi.

Parraweena is located near Black Creek, a tributary of the Mooki River. The postcode is 2339.
