= Gap, New South Wales =

Coordinates: 31°21′S 150°36′E

Gap is a railway location in New South Wales, Australia. It is the location of the junction between the Mungindi (or North-West) railway line and the Binnaway – Werris Creek Line. A passenger platform was provided to the north of the junction between 1940 and 1971. This location has also been known as 'The Gap', one of many places in New South Wales so named.

Preceding station	Former services	Following station
Curlewis towards Mungindi	Mungindi Line	Werris Creek Terminus
Caroona towards Binnaway	Binnaway–Werris Creek Line	Werris Creek Terminus
