= Quipolly, New South Wales =

Town in New South Wales, Australia

Coordinates: 31°26′S 150°40′E

Quipolly is the site of a closed railway station on the Main North railway line in New South Wales, Australia. It is located about 8 kilometres (5.0 mi) south of Werris Creek. At the 2006 census, Quipolly had a population of 327 people.

The station was open between 1879 and 1974, and no trace now remains. A passing loop exists at the site.

Preceding station	Former services	Following station
Werris Creek towards Wallangarra	Main Northern Line	Quirindi towards Sydney
