= Bomera =

Bomera may refer to:

- Bomera (house), a heritage-listed residence in Sydney, Australia
- Bomera, New South Wales, a locality in Australia
