= Box Ridge, New South Wales =

Box Ridge, New South Wales is a bounded rural locality in New South Wales. The suburb is adjacent to the town of Binnaway and lies on the Binnaway to Werris Creek Railway. The locality is southeast of Coonabarabran.
