= Caroona =

- Town
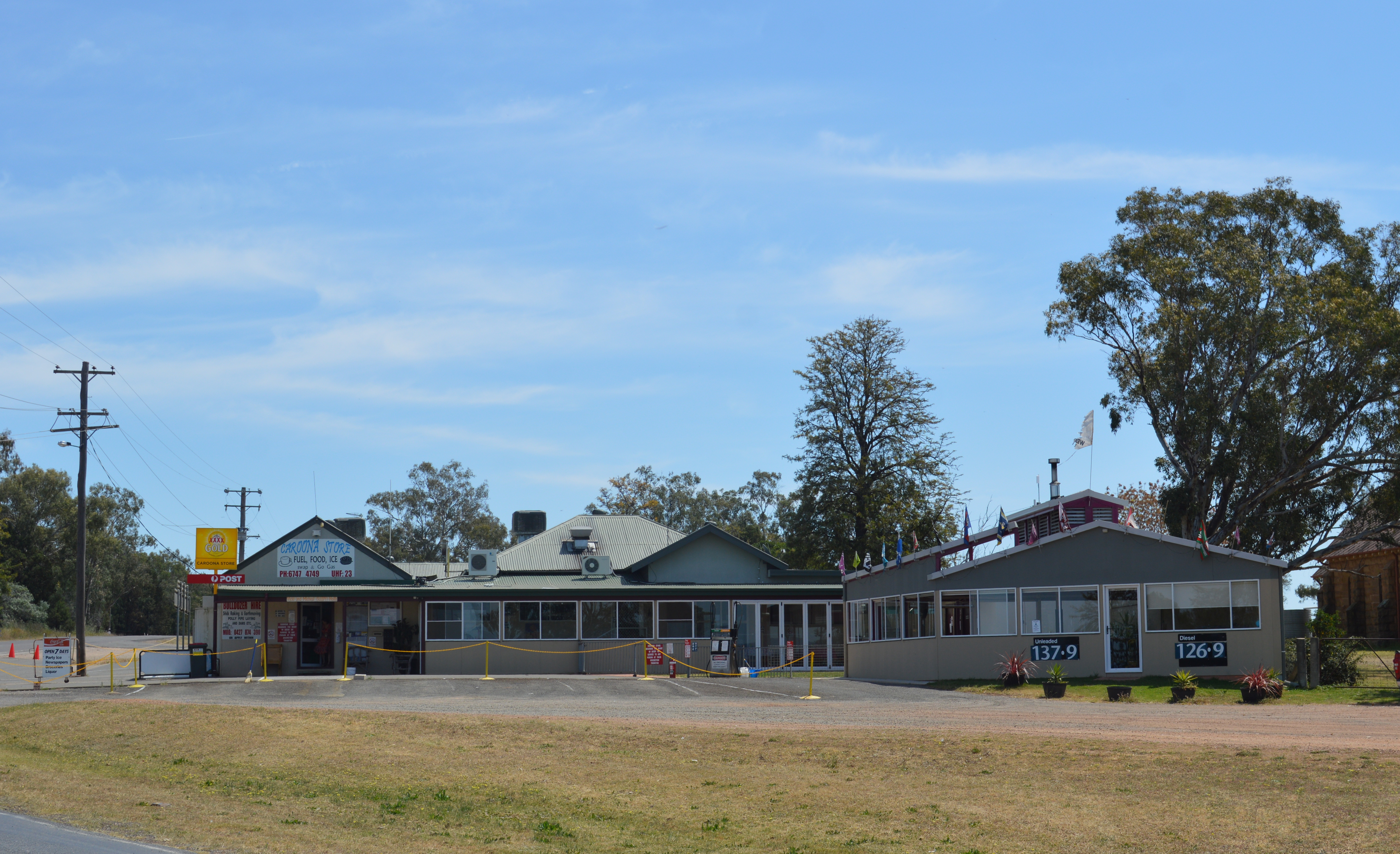
- The Caroona Store

- Coordinates: 31°24′S 150°25′E
- Country: Australia
- State: New South Wales
- LGA: Liverpool Plains Shire

Government
  - State electorates: Tamworth; Upper Hunter
  - Federal divisions: New England; Parkes

Population
  - Total: 196 (SAL 2021)

Caroona is a small village in Liverpool Plains Shire, New South Wales, Australia.

Caroona is located on the Quirindi-Coonabarabran road, about 20 kilometres WNW of Quirindi. There are also road links to Werris Creek and Pine Ridge. Caroona is located in the prime Liverpool Plains agricultural region.

Caroona formerly had a station on the Binnaway – Werris Creek railway line and has a grain storage and loading facility. Caroona is located near the Mooki River.

The village of Walhallow is located about 2 kilometres north of Caroona, although it is across the local government area boundary, in Gunnedah Shire. Walhallow was the site of an Aboriginal reserve and mission known as Caroona Mission, which holds many sacred sites.
