= Werris Creek railway station =

Railway station in New South Wales, Australia

Werris Creek
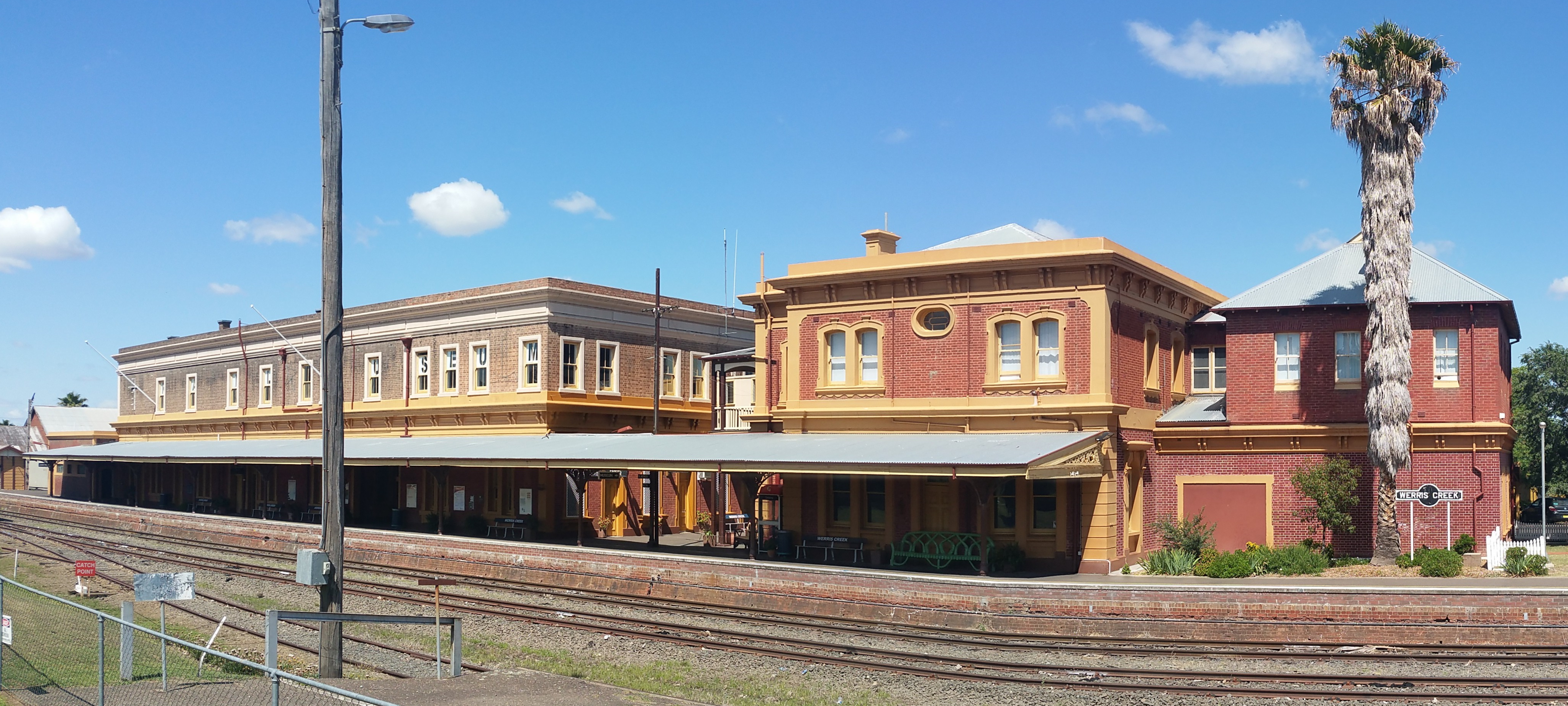
- Station buildings in November 2017

General information
- Location: Werris Creek Road, Werris Creek, New South Wales; Australia
- Coordinates: 31°20′58″S 150°38′47″E
- Owner: Transport Asset Manager of New South Wales
- Operator: NSW TrainLink
- Lines: Main Northern line; Mungindi line; Binnaway–Werris Creek line
- Distance: 410.7 km (255.2 mi) from Central
- Platforms: 2

Construction
- Structure type: Ground
- Accessible: Yes
- Architect: John Whitton
- Architectural style: Victorian Free Classical

Other information
- Status: Weekdays: Staffed: 10.15am to 3.15pm: Weekends and public holidays: Unstaffed
- Station code: WCK

History
- Opened: 1880

Services
Preceding station	NSW TrainLink	Following station
Tamworth towards Armidale	NSW TrainLink North Western Line	Quirindi towards Sydney
Gunnedah towards Moree	NSW TrainLink North Western Line	Quirindi towards Sydney
Former services
Preceding station	Former services	Following station
Warrigundi towards Wallangarra	Main Northern Line	Quipolly towards Sydney
Gap towards Mungindi	Mungindi Line	Terminus
Gap towards Binnaway	Binnaway–Werris Creek Line	Terminus

New South Wales Heritage Register
- Official name: Werris Creek Railway Station, yard group and movable relics
- Type: State heritage (complex / group)
- Designated: 2 April 1999
- Reference no.: 1285
- Type: Railway Platform / Station
- Category: Transport – Rail
Location

Werris Creek railway station is a heritage-listed railway station located at the junction of the Main Northern, Mungindi and Binnaway–Werris Creek lines (Keilbahnhof) in Werris Creek of New South Wales, Australia. The station serves the town of Werris Creek and was built between 1877 and 1880. The station is also known as Werris Creek Railway Station, yard group and movable relics. The property was added to the New South Wales State Heritage Register on 2 April 1999.

== History ==
The story of the railway line across Parry Shire began in the early 1870s when the construction of the Great Northern Line had stalled at the foot of the Liverpool Plains. From 1876 the line pressed on over the range and down onto the plains below. It was in 1877 that the parliament of Sydney decided to build a branch line from the major rail trunk in the direction of Gunnedah. The branch was to start in an open paddock owned by John Single near Werris Creek, and thus the town of Werris Creek had its beginning. It was the first railway town in New South Wales starting from a broad-acre site and developing exclusively to service the railways.

It remained a railway town for the next century and a quarter, with railway work being the overwhelming form of employment. The original station at Werris Creek was about half a kilometre south of the current junction. However, with the opening of the line to Gunnedah and the splitting of the mail trains from Newcastle at Werris creek, it was necessary to have a station nearer to the actual branching line. The platform of the new station was finished in 1879. From the new platform was to rise a magnificent station complex. It was to be a remarkable building that could easily grace a city, a monument to railway confidence and bureaucratic power, yet, incongruously, a lonely citadel in the middle of the bush. The station consisted of a refreshment room and station building. On completion of these two buildings in 1885, a town began to develop on the eastern side of the railway line.

In 1925, the office of the District Superintendent of Railways was moved from Murrurundi to Werris Creek and a second story was added to the station building to accommodate new staff. Werris Creek remained an important rail junction until the advent of diesel and electric trains in the 1960s. Together with the decline in rail travel and freight, and the economic rationalising of the 1980s and 1990s, the town of Werris Creek lost much of its importance as a railway hub.

Werris Creek was a purpose-built rail centre and as such, claims to be Australia's first specific railway town. It dates to 1877 when the NSW Government decided that the Great Northern Line needed a depot and junction from where branches would run to the west and north-west, thus helping to open up and serve the rich pastoral areas further inland. Werris Creek became a major junction, with the Main Northern, Mungindi and Binnaway lines all intersecting in the region. It was the first, and remains the last, railway town in New South Wales. In 1913, a locomotive depot opened with a roundhouse built in 1920.

An isolated bushland spot was chosen where the northern line at that time cut through George Single's paddock, halfway between Quirindi and Tamworth. This was called Werris Creek, a variation on the Aboriginal name for the district, Weia Weia, meaning "stop here, rest awhile". The town became the busiest rural freight base in the state as well as a key passenger junction as goods and people alike joined or left the main Sydney line destined to or coming from places like Gunnedah, Narrabri, Moree and many similar settlements that were emerging.

By the early 1880s, a magnificent railway station had appeared at Werris Creek. The NSW State Rail Authority Heritage Unit described it as "a remarkable building that could easily grace a city ...yet, incongruously, a lonely citadel in the middle of the bush". It boasted an impressive refreshment room in the Victorian Free Classical style built of rich, red bricks in tuck-pointed Flemish bond with crisp stucco embellishments, pronounced cornices with paired brackets and moulded, grouped windows. A grand (red) cedar staircase led to a floor of bedrooms for those travellers who had time to sleep between connections. It was "not unlike a city bank...until it was covered with its first of many layers of soot". The late 1880s heritage-listed station building was designed by John Whitton and is the third largest in New South Wales.

In 1896, a locomotive shed formerly in use in Gunnedah was erected opposite the station. In 1917, a 10 stall roundhouse was erected one kilometre south of the station, with a further five stalls added in 1920. In November 1954, the 23-metre (75 ft) turntable was replaced by a 32-metre (105 ft) example to allow 60 class locomotives to be turned.

Eventually, a cross-country line was built from Binnaway near Coonabarabran to Werris Creek, thus linking the northern line to both the Main Western and Main Southern, lines. The population soared to 2,500 as workers flocked to staff and service the countless trains that came and went day and night and Werris Creek became known as the "town that never sleeps".

For approximately 70 years, Werris Creek was the largest railway centre in northern New South Wales, the depot alone employing 800 people. From the 1970s, the railway began to decline, but it still remains an important part of the network, with Pacific National still using the depot. The introduction of diesel locomotives and centralisation of the rail system led to the demise of the complex's importance. The jobs of tradesmen servicing steam trains disappeared. The population halved as rail jobs fell from 800 to 100. Town morale sank as its heart and soul began to disappear. Even though passenger and freight trains still passed through Werris Creek, as they still do, it seemed destined to become yet another country town fading into oblivion.

=== Monument and museum ===
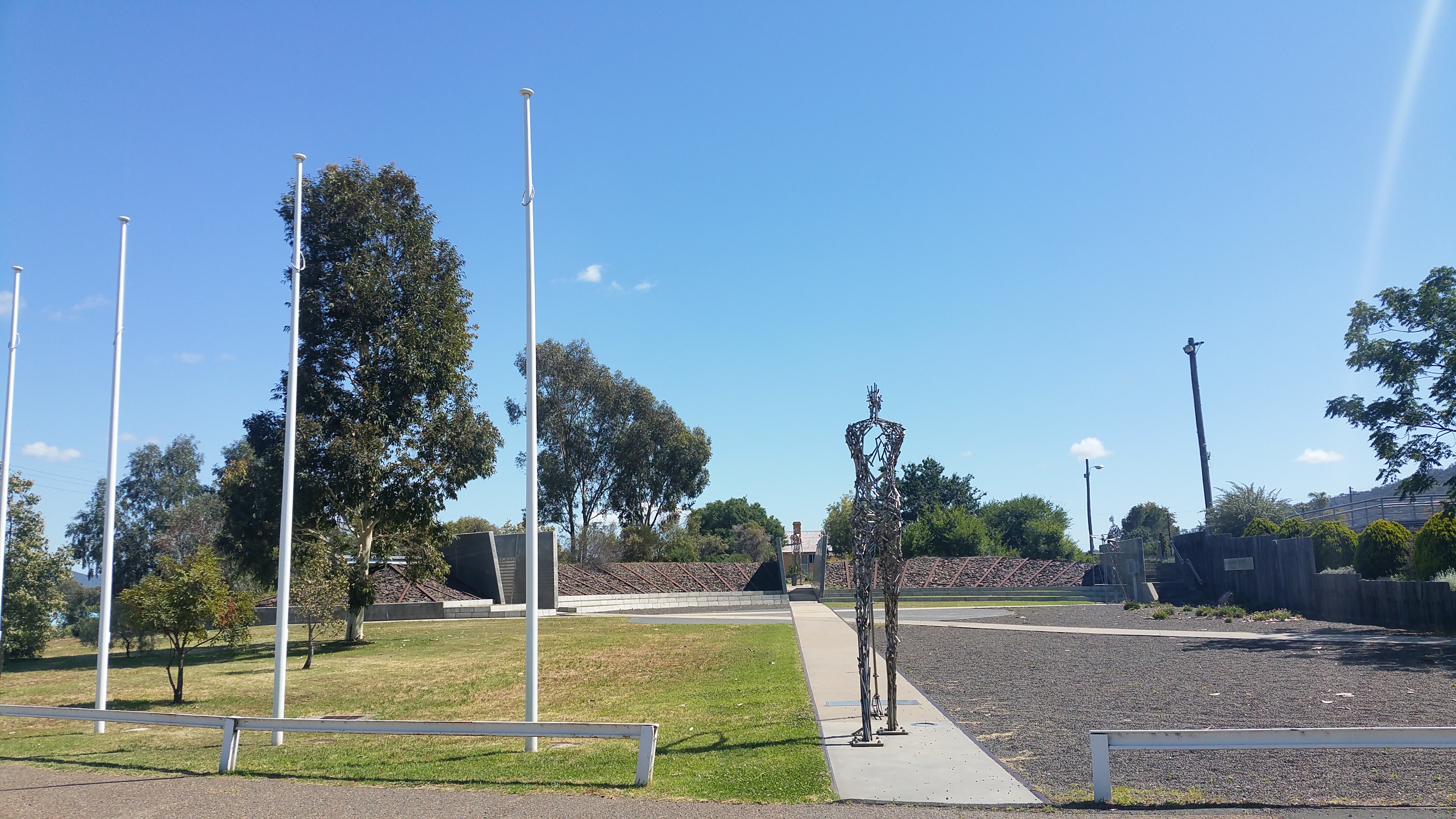
Australian Railway Monument

In 1989, a committee led by Chris Holley – a former porter, shunter, guard and controller, strongly supported by a band of fellow retired railmen such as veteran yard master Les Brown – vowed that Werris Creek would not die. Their determination led to the acceptance of a plan envisaged by Dr Stuart Sharp, of the former NSW State Rail Authority Heritage Unit, involving creation of an Australian Railway Monument. The 3-metre (9.8 ft) high stainless steel sculptures this comprises depict a fettler, shunter and firemen, a signalman, gatekeeper and flag lady. The sculptor is Dominique Sutton who also worked on Sydney Olympic Park. They look down on a specially landscaped amphitheatre beside the railway station. Memorial walls complement the amphitheatre and contain more than 2,400 names of all those railway people who had lost their lives either at work or from injuries received at work.

While funding came principally from the NSW Government ($1.3m), some 40 townsfolk – mostly former railway men and women pledged themselves as volunteers to run the complex. It opened on 1 October 2005 as the Australian Railway Monument and the Rail Journeys Museum and since has averaged more than 10,000 visitors per annum. The museum contains a wide range of memorabilia depicting country railways' past and in the future aims to present a comprehensive account of Australia's railway history. An historic display depicts the history of Werris Creek as the first railway town in Australia from the age of steam through to the modern day diesel.

== Services ==
Werris Creek is served by NSW TrainLink's daily Northern Tablelands Xplorer service. The service from Sydney divides at platform 1 before continuing to Armidale and Moree.

Platform	Line	Stopping pattern	Notes
1	North Western Region	Services to Sydney & Armidale/Moree	
2	North Western Region	Set down service from Moree	

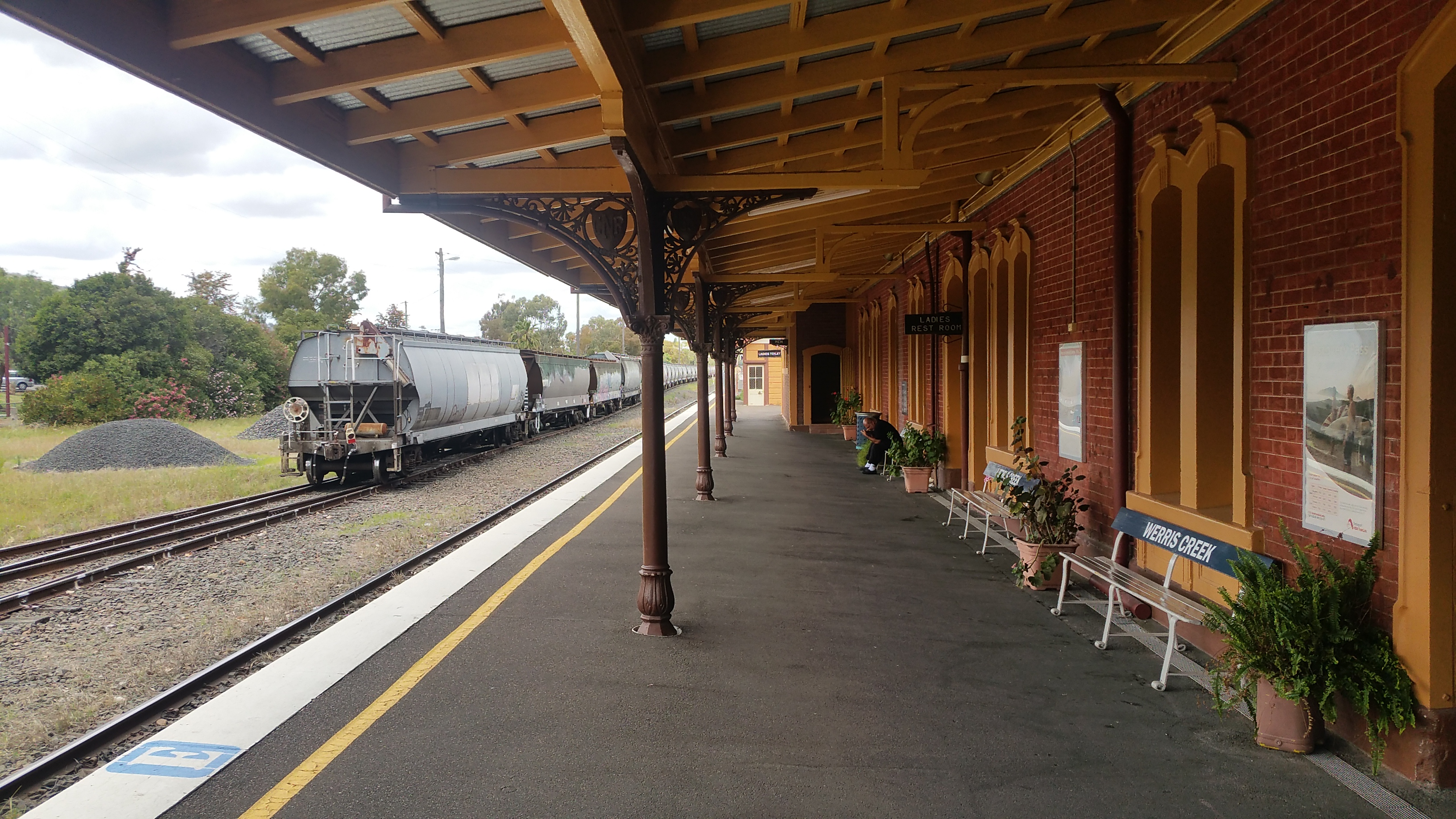
Looking South on Platform 1

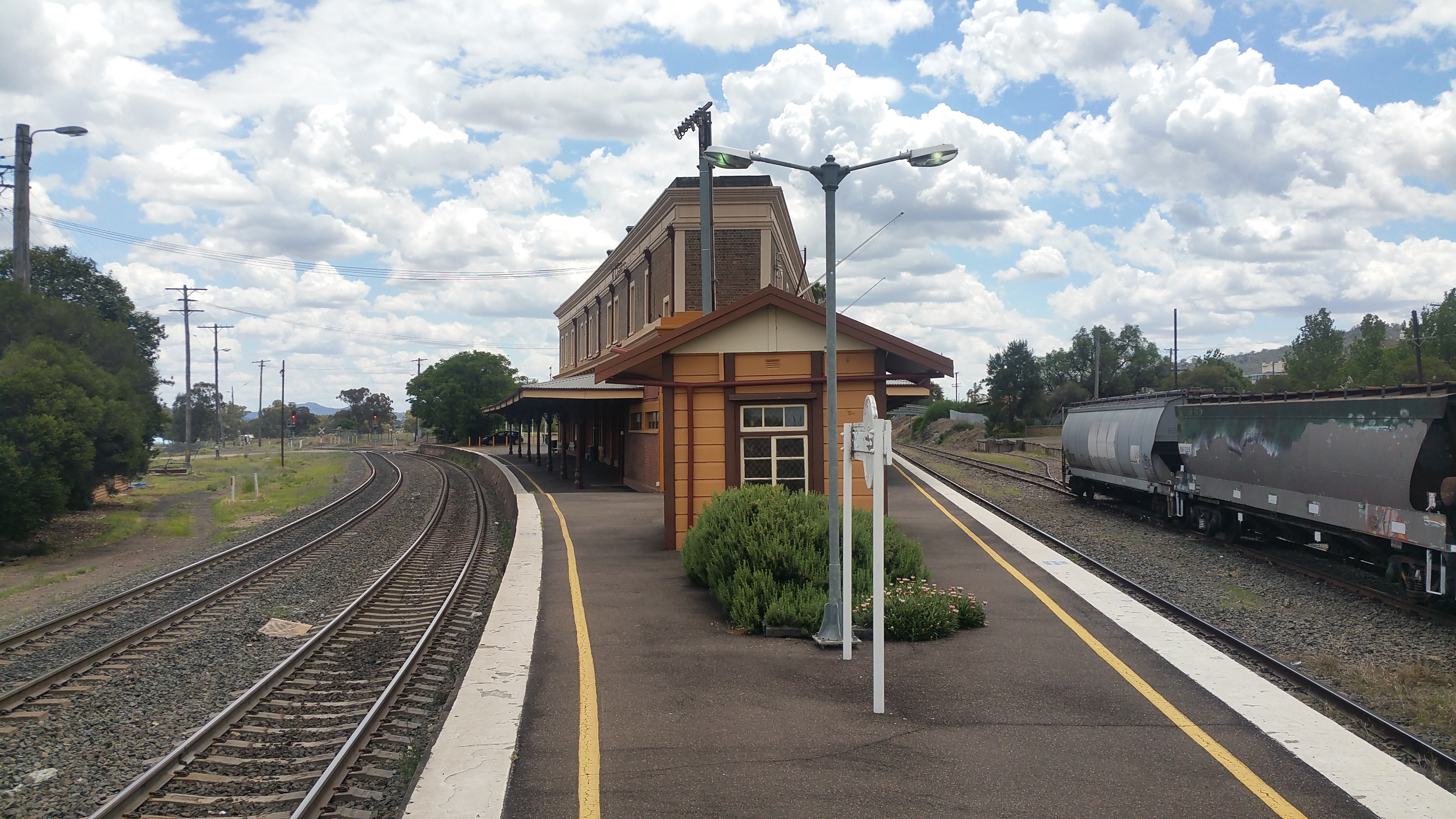
Looking North from Platform 2

== Description ==
MAJOR STRUCTURES – Managed by RailCorp Station Building – type 5, first class (1880, 1923) Railway Refreshment Rooms (1885, 1912) houses the Rail Journeys Museum Luggage Room (1902) Signal Box (1925) Platform face (1880) Footbridge (1893) Australian Railway Monument (2005)

MAJOR STRUCTURES – Managed by ARTC Station Master's Residence (1913) Workshop, and Staff Hut Former gas retort building, Down side Former electricity generator building Down side

STATION BUILDING, LUGGAGE ROOM AND RRR (1880 – 1923) The station and RRR buildings present as grand two-storey Victorian Free Classical buildings. The original facades of the 1885 buildings remain largely intact. The facade expresses the load bearing-wall construction of painted stone and a rich red face brickwork. Brickwork is Flemish bond with white tuck pointing. All stone quoins and timber detailing are painted in a golden yellow. Most windows on both buildings are double hung with single panes of glass. Original doors remain and are generally four – panelled timber doors with fanlights, and stone architraves. A parapet conceals the roof of the original RRR building and features a decorative entablature, two urns and a projecting cornice with classical consoles. A timber verandah with simple timber detailing and timber balustrade is also located on the southern entry to the RRR building.

A deep verandah roofed in corrugated sheet runs along the rail platforms and along the east and west elevation of the station building. The verandah was extended in 1892 along the east of the RRR building. The verandah features decorative timber rafters supported on slender round cast iron columns with cast iron brackets.

The first floor storey extension of the kitchen in the 1911 building and the 1960 southern extension to the station building use a similar red brick. The roof is a simple half gabled (gabled hip) roof with exposed rafter. The first floor storey extensions of the station building in 1923 and 1939 are of a Georgian revival style and use a different light brown brick. The roof is concealed by a simple geometric parapet.

A later fibro sheet bridge connects the two buildings. Interior fabric of both buildings have been largely altered. An original timber staircase, cast iron columns, and timber ceiling remain intact in the RRR building.

SIGNAL BOX (1925) The signal box is a simple timber structure with rusticated weatherboards and a simple gable roof. The northern facade features a single timber panelled door. The other three facades feature three-paned timber sliding windows with a three-paned fanlight. Internally the signal box retains signal equipment and the manual switch for the railway tracks.

PLATFORM (1880)

STATION MASTER'S RESIDENCE (1913) The SM's residence was most likely built for the night Station Master in 1913. The building is a simple Federation gable-roofed weatherboard cottage that features simple detailing and a front verandah on the north side. The residence has double hung multi-pane windows, timber window awnings and decorative timber valances at the ends of the verandah. It also has modern pipe columns in the place of the original timber verandah posts. A later fibro sheet extension has been added to the western facade. Much of the original interior detail remains intact, such as timber doors, architraves, cornices and fireplaces.

FOOTBRIDGE (1893) A simple girder structure made from old rails. Its main feature is the joining of the old rails head to head so the rail feet form flanges (I-beams).

MOVEABLE ITEMS Wall clock, large, 0.5/2.4/0.3, (AC02) refreshment room Seat, 1.8/0.9/0.9, (LA03) refreshment room Rotating chair patterned seat, (CA05), platform store Rotating chair patterned seat, (CA06), platform store Office desk, 1.5/1.0/0.7, recessed handles, (DA07), refreshment room.

LANDSCAPE The area to the north of the RRR today comprises the Australian Railway Monument, a bitumen-paved car park and an Australian native plant garden on the eastern (main platform) side. The plant types in the garden include a predominance of grevilleas. This new garden has been developed over the past decade with volunteer labour.

=== Condition ===
As at 19 August 2009, (Railway Monument & landscaping proposal) According to the Statement of Heritage Impact (2004) and the Archaeological Assessment (2004), the site has the potential to contain disturbed archaeological deposits of unknown, but potentially low-moderate significance. The potential for intact, undetected sub-surface deposits relating to indigenous occupation is considered to be low.

The station buildings are integrous and intact with some modifications in recent decades (including for example changes to the refreshment room for use as a museum). As a precinct, Werris Creek is an outstanding intact place.

=== Modifications and dates ===
- 1877: The location of the original station was about half a kilometre south of the current junction. With the opening of the line to Gunnedah, and the splitting of mail trains from Newcastle at Werris Creek, it was necessary to have a station nearer to the actual branching line.
- 1879: The platform of the new station was finished
- 1880: The present station building is the second on this site, built in 1880, 2 years after the railway opened.
- 1885: The station building and refreshment room finished.
- 1912: Additions to refreshment room.
- 1925: A second storey added to station building.
- 2005: Australian Railway Monument and museum opened.

== Heritage listing ==
Werris Creek is a large Victorian station complex with a major freight and locomotive facility which developed because of its location at the junction of the main north line with the north west branch. The town developed to support the railway facility and the grandness of the facilities reflects the importance of the railway in the area. The present station building is the second on this site and was built in 1880, 2 years after the railway opened. It is architecturally significant as it comprises a collection of major non standard buildings laid out in the junction of the two lines giving an unusual and unique platform and building arrangement. It is also of high architectural interest for the quality of the design and detail and of townscape importance because of its dominance in the town and its incongruity in the location. The relationship of other facilities such as roundhouse and miscellaneous support facilities adds to the significance of the site. Some of the adjacent buildings to the station date from the opening of the railway and are interesting remnants of workshops and support facilities that have rarely survived on the system.

The Werris Creek Railway Station is significant to the community for social and cultural reasons. Its significance lies in its history and the role it played in the development of not only Werris Creek but also Parry Shire. It was the centre of the peripheral development of an entire city and also those surrounding rural communities that depended upon it for transport, communication and trade. Furthermore, It is an impressive structure in the Victorian Free Classical Style, with lavish design qualities that earn it high aesthetic significance. Lastly, it is representative of the importance railways played in the transport and communication for rural communities (Heritage Study).

The building has a dominant effect on the streetscape and character of the town, with elaborate detail and architectural quality.

Werris Creek railway station was listed on the New South Wales State Heritage Register on 2 April 1999 having satisfied the following criteria.

The place is important in demonstrating the course, or pattern, of cultural or natural history in New South Wales.

The Werris Creek railway precinct is significant for its historical values as a tangible link to the development of the Great Northern Railway (GNR) line during the 19th century as well as the development of the NSW railways generally. The GNR was an important achievement in transport and engineering within NSW. As the third main trunk rail route in NSW stretching from Sydney to the Queensland border, the line linked townships to one another as well as to Sydney leading to significant economic and social impacts for those individual townships as well as for NSW more generally. Werris Creek Railway Precinct is significant as a major junction on the northern NSW railway system. From 1877 trains travelling north could follow the Great Northern Railway line to the Queensland border via Werris Creek or they could branch off to Gunnedah (and eventually Moree) at Werris Creek. The junction became highly significant as a place where passengers and goods were transhipped, where trains and crews changed and where passengers stopped for refreshments. The small town, which developed out of nothing to be a significant railway service centre, where many families were sustained by the income derived from railway related employment. The scale and grandeur of some of the buildings reflects the importance given to this location by railway authorities in the late 19th century.

The place has a strong or special association with a person, or group of persons, of importance of cultural or natural history of New South Wales's history.

Werris Creek Railway Precinct is significant for its association with John Whitton, "father" of the NSW Railways, and his colleagues and successors. The place is a fine example of late nineteenth century railway architecture. It therefore stands as a monument to Whitton's elegant vision for a substantial railway building at Werris Creek.

The place is important in demonstrating aesthetic characteristics and/or a high degree of creative or technical achievement in New South Wales.

Werris Creek Railway Precinct is significant as one of the largest and best examples of highly intact Victorian and Federation railway architecture in NSW. The precinct is significant for its high quality of design, detailing and its unique setting at the junction of two railway lines. It demonstrates refined taste and competent detailing, especially in the two-storey railway refreshment rooms. Recent works to the place have recovered aspects of significance such as the large refreshment room with its high ceilings and cast iron columns. The works have been researched in detail to enable the authentic values of the RRR to be conserved.

The place makes an important contribution to the townscape of Werris Creek. It includes extant evidence of the passenger station, railway refreshment rooms, gas and power plants and other items including staff cottages and nearby sheds and a locomotive depot.

The place has a strong or special association with a particular community or cultural group in New South Wales for social, cultural or spiritual reasons.

Werris Creek developed as a "railway town" and throughout much of its history most or all residents of the town were either directly employed by the railways or had close links to the railways. Many residents in the town are still involved in the rail industry, are retired railway employees, and/or are volunteers at the museum. Werris Creek is home to the Australian Railway Monument (a memorial for railway employees throughout Australia who were killed at work) and to the "Rail Journeys" museum which is located in the former refreshment room.

The place has potential to yield information that will contribute to an understanding of the cultural or natural history of New South Wales.

The place has some potential to reveal information about rail travel generally and about the design and operation of refreshments rooms and major country stations particularly with the ability to interpret this to the public in association with the present museum.

The place possesses uncommon, rare or endangered aspects of the cultural or natural history of New South Wales.

The arrangement and scale of the station buildings on the junction platform is unusual. Few locations have buildings of this scale (other examples include Junee and Moss Vale).

The place is important in demonstrating the principal characteristics of a class of cultural or natural places/environments in New South Wales.

Werris Creek Railway Precinct is significant as it demonstrates the principal characteristics of nineteenth-century railway places. It has intact evidence of the passenger station and railway refreshment rooms. The SM's residence has local significance as an example of the standard of housing provided to railway employees in the early part of the twentieth century.

== See also ==
- List of regional railway stations in New South Wales
