= Quirindi Herald and District News =

Australian newspaper

Quirindi Herald and District News (5 January 1906)

Quirindi Herald and District News was an English language newspaper published from 1905 to 1925 in Quirindi, 346 km (215 mi) NNW of Sydney, New South Wales, Australia.

== Newspaper history ==
Quirindi Herald and District News was preceded by Quirindi Magpie, which was published from before 3 January 1899 (vol. 1, no. 45) until 30 May 1905 (vol. 7, no. 664). Also in publication before Quirindi Herald and District News was Quirindi Gazette and Liverpool Plains Advocate, which was published from 1885, although this title continued until 1925. On 3 July 1925, the Quirindi Advocate came into being and continues to this day.

Publication	Commenced publication	Ceased publication
Quirindi Magpie	Pre-January 1899	30 May 1905
Quirindi Gazette and Liverpool Plains Advertiser	1885	1925
Quirindi Herald and District News	1905	1925
Quirindi Advocate	3 July 1925	ongoing

== Digitisation ==
Quirindi Herald and District News has been digitised as part of the Australian Newspapers Digitisation Program hosted by the National Library of Australia.

== See also ==
- List of newspapers in New South Wales
- List of newspapers in Australia
