= Big Jacks Creek, New South Wales =

Big Jacks Creek New South Wales
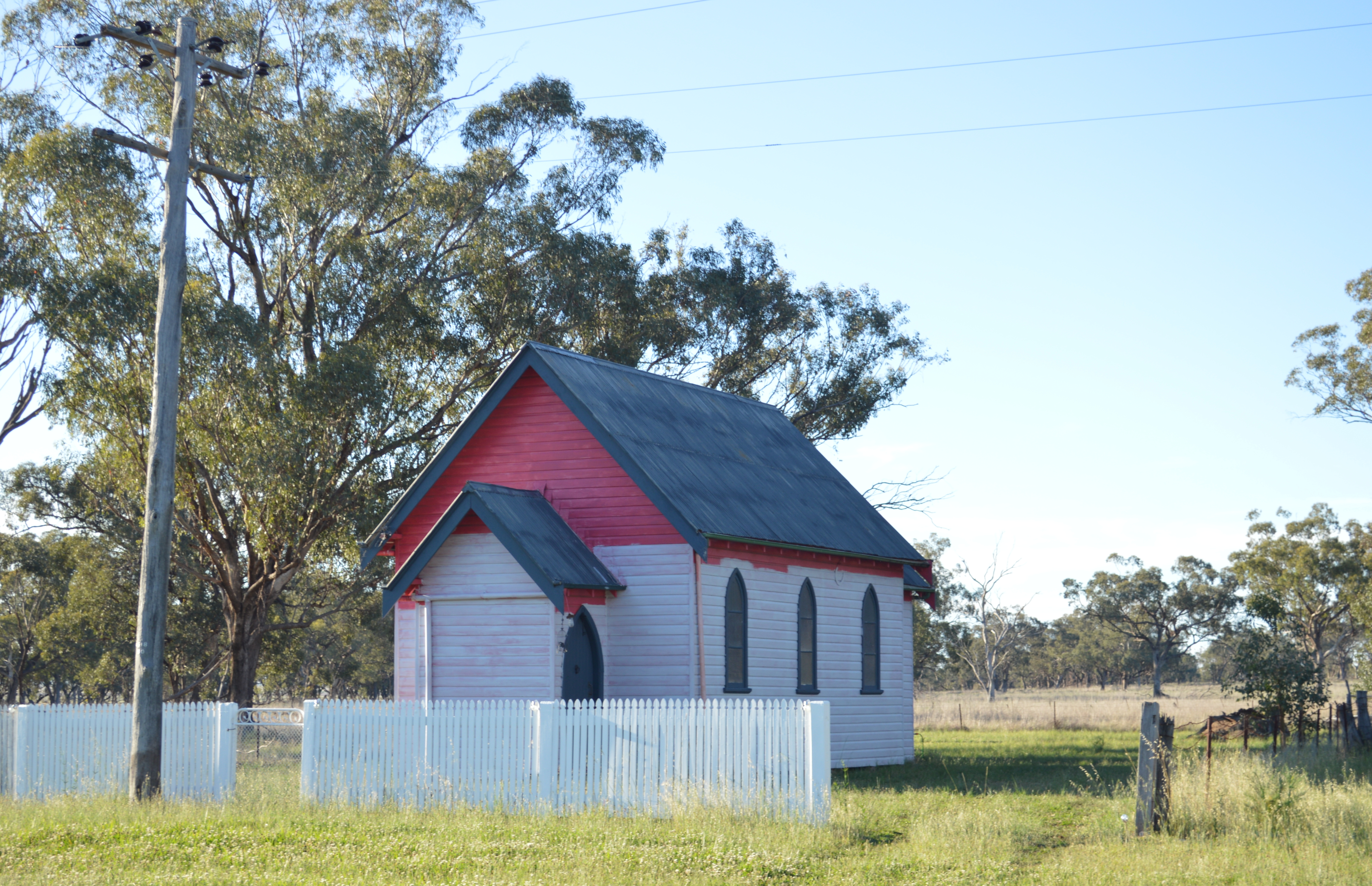
- A former church at Big Jacks Creek, 2017

- Coordinates: 31°43′19″S 150°35′01″E
- Population: 56 (2016 census)
- Postcode(s): 2339
- Location: 313 km (194 mi) NNW of Sydney; 95 km (59 mi) S of Tamworth; 23 km (14 mi) SW of Willow Tree
- LGA(s): Liverpool Plains Shire
- State electorate(s): Upper Hunter
- Federal division(s): New England

Big Jacks Creek is a locality in the North West Slopes region of New South Wales, Australia. The locality is in the Liverpool Plains Shire local government area, 313 kilometres (194 mi) north west of the state capital, Sydney.

At the 2016 census, Big Jacks Creek had a population of 56.
