= Blackville, New South Wales =

Blackville New South Wales
- Population: 128 (SAL 2021)
- Postcode(s): 2343
- LGA(s): Liverpool Plains Shire
- State electorate(s): Tamworth
- Federal division(s): New England

Blackville is a rural locality in the state of New South Wales, Australia.

Blackville is located in the Liverpool Plains area, and it is about 40 kilometres WSW of the nearest significant town, Quirindi. To the south of Blackville is the Coolah Tops National Park.

Blackville Public School is a primary school located at Blackville.

Blackville is located near Black Creek, a tributary of the Mooki River. The postcode is 2343.
