= Buckland County =

Buckland
- Cadastral division
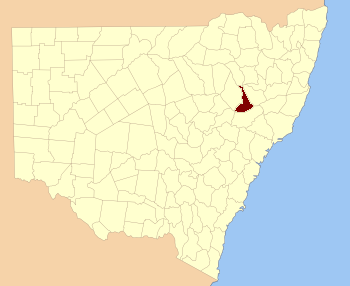
- Location in New South Wales
- Country: Australia
- State: New South Wales
Lands administrative divisions around Buckland
Pottinger	Nandewar	Darling
Pottinger	Buckland	Parry
Bligh	Brisbane	Brisbane

Buckland County is one of the 141 cadastral divisions of New South Wales. It is situated between a small part of the Namoi River in the north to the Liverpool Range in the south. The Mooki River is the boundary to the west. It includes Quirindi.

Buckland County was proclaimed as a county on 30 December 1848 as one of 15 counties then proclaimed Description:-'County of Buckland, containing about 1,484 square miles (3,840 km^{2}). Whilst no official record of naming of the county has been found and there can be no certainty as to the person after whom it was named it is considered possible that the county was named in honour of the Reverend Dr. Buckland.

== Parishes within this county ==
A full list of parishes found within this county; their current LGA and mapping coordinates to the approximate centre of each location is as follows:

Parish	LGA	Coordinates
Babbinboon	Gunnedah Shire Council	31°02′54″S 150°33′04″E
Borambil	Liverpool Plains Shire Council	31°18′54″S 150°36′04″E
Carroll	Gunnedah Shire Council	30°59′54″S 150°29′04″E
Clift	Tamworth Regional Council	31°17′54″S 150°37′04″E
Coeypolly	Liverpool Plains Shire Council	31°25′54″S 150°46′04″E
Cooridoon	Gunnedah Shire Council	30°59′54″S 150°20′04″E
Currabubula	Liverpool Plains Shire Council	31°16′54″S 150°43′04″E
Denver	Gunnedah Shire Council	31°10′54″S 150°30′04″E
Dight	Gunnedah Shire Council	31°03′54″S 150°27′04″E
Evan	Liverpool Plains Shire Council	31°21′54″S 150°48′04″E
Ferrier	Gunnedah Shire Council	31°18′54″S 150°31′04″E
Gregson	Liverpool Plains Shire Council	31°43′54″S 150°37′04″E
Grenfell	Tamworth Regional Council	31°23′54″S 150°36′04″E
Gunnadilly	Liverpool Plains Shire Council	31°27′54″S 150°31′04″E
Hudson	Liverpool Plains Shire Council	31°41′54″S 150°20′04″E
Loder	Liverpool Plains Shire Council	31°36′54″S 150°52′04″E
Moan	Liverpool Plains Shire Council	31°42′54″S 150°12′04″E
Mooki	Gunnedah Shire Council	31°12′54″S 150°29′04″E
Parnell	Liverpool Plains Shire Council	31°29′54″S 150°54′04″E
Parsons Hill	Liverpool Plains Shire Council	31°36′54″S 150°30′04″E
Piallaway	Tamworth Regional Council	31°09′54″S 150°38′04″E
Quirindi	Liverpool Plains Shire Council	31°29′54″S 150°43′04″E
Telford	Liverpool Plains Shire Council	31°32′54″S 150°25′04″E
Temi	Liverpool Plains Shire Council	31°41′54″S 150°49′04″E
Texas	Gunnedah Shire Council	31°08′54″S 150°28′04″E
Towarri	Liverpool Plains Shire Council	31°49′54″S 150°37′04″E
Wallabadah	Liverpool Plains Shire Council	31°28′54″S 150°48′04″E
Wallala	Gunnedah Shire Council	31°22′54″S 150°29′04″E
Warrah	Liverpool Plains Shire Council	31°33′54″S 150°37′04″E
Werrie	Tamworth Regional Council	31°19′54″S 150°42′04″E
Willow Tree	Liverpool Plains Shire Council	31°39′54″S 150°44′04″E
Windy	Liverpool Plains Shire Council	31°35′54″S 150°21′04″E
Yarrimanbah	Liverpool Plains Shire Council	31°47′54″S 150°26′04″E
