= Premer, New South Wales =

Premer
- Suburb
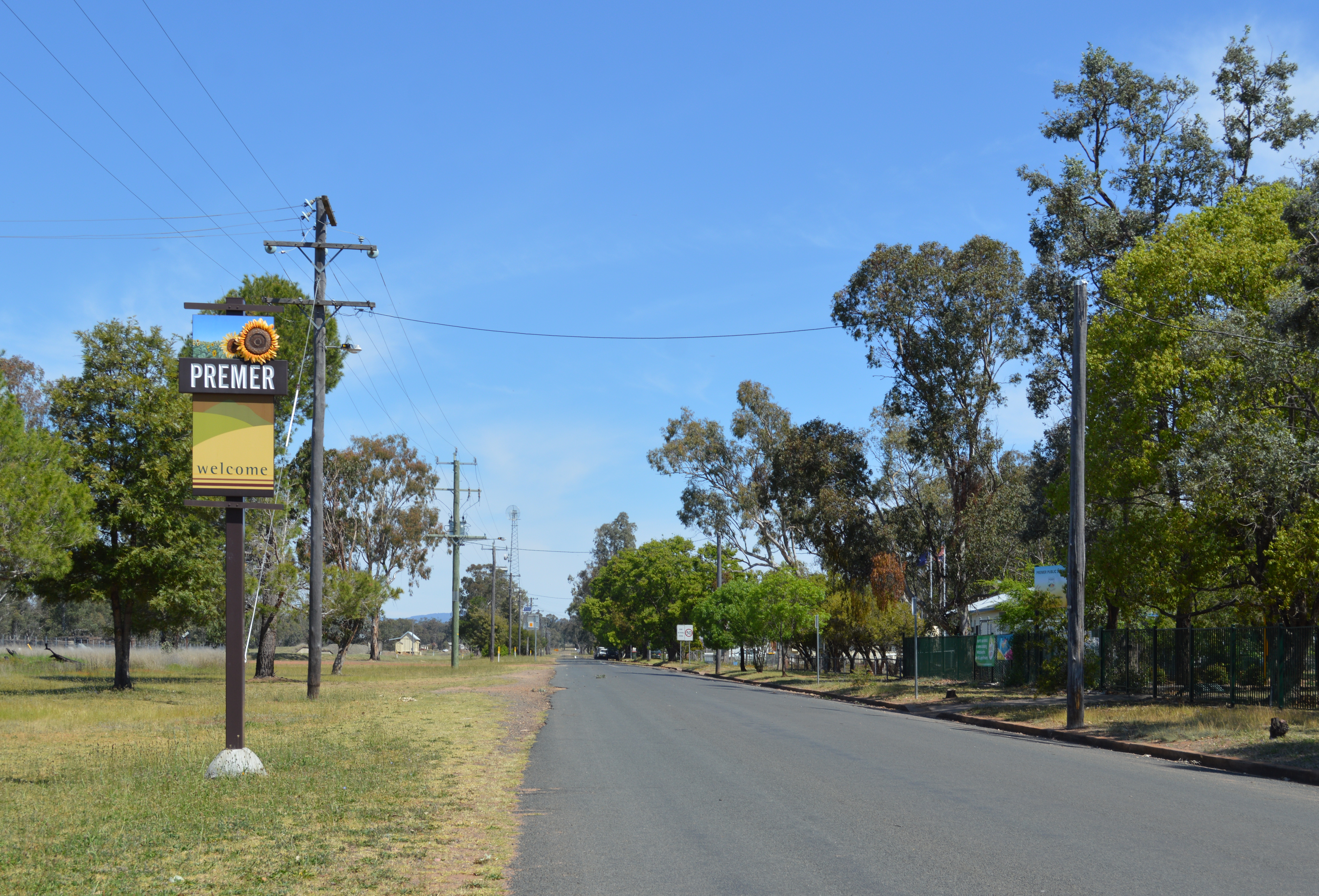
- Ellerslie Street, Premer

- Coordinates: 31°28′S 149°54′E
- Country: Australia
- State: New South Wales
- LGAs: Gunnedah Shire; Liverpool Plains Shire; Warrumbungle Shire

Government
  - State electorates: Barwon; Tamworth; Upper Hunter
  - Federal divisions: New England; Parkes

Population
  - Total: 126 (SAL 2021)
- Postcode: 2381

Premer is a small town in North-Western New South Wales, Australia. At the 2021 census, Premer had a population of 126.

Premer consists of residential houses, Premer Public School, a preschool, a caravan park, a community health centre, a Lions club, a post office, a town hall, a church, farms and a hotel.

== Transport ==
The town formerly had a station on the Binnaway-Werris Creek railway line.

== Maps ==
- Street-directory.com.au
