= Bomera, New South Wales =

Locality in New South Wales, Australia

Bomera, New South Wales is a bounded rural locality in New South Wales, southeast of Coonabarabran. It is near the town of Binnaway and lies on the Binnaway to Werris Creek Railway, though the Bomera station closed in the late 1970s. The area is largely agricultural in its economic activity.
