= Mooki River =

Coordinates: 30°58′S 150°17′E

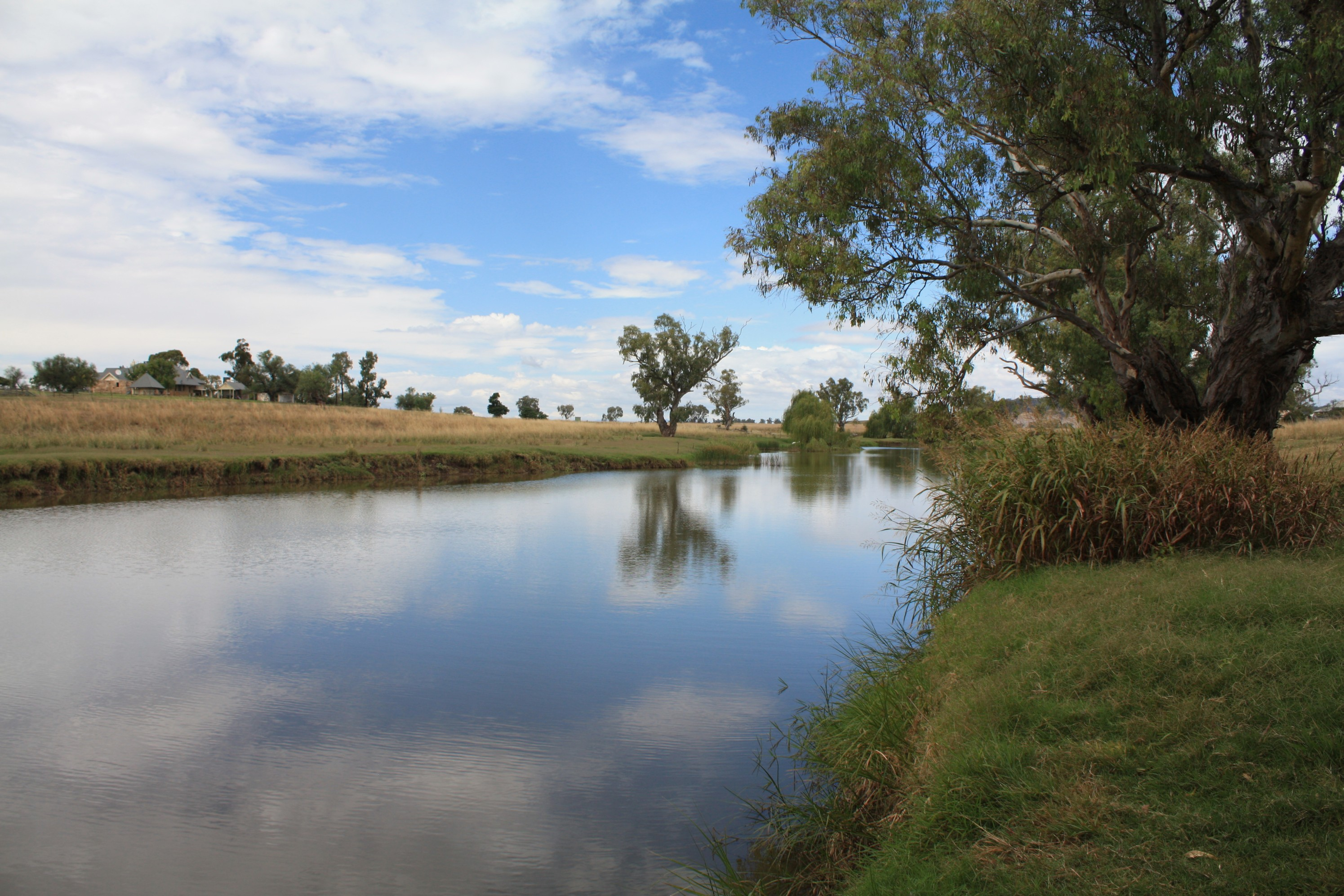
- Mooki River at Caroona
- Etymology: Aboriginal: name given to the river by Aboriginal tribes roaming the lower reaches

Location
- Country: Australia
- State: New South Wales
- Region: IBRA: New England Tablelands
- District: Northern Tablelands
- Municipality: Gunnedah, Liverpool Plains

Physical characteristics
- Source: Liverpool Range
  - location: south-west of Quirindi
  - elevation: 351 m (1,152 ft)
- 2nd source: Omaleah Creek and Phillips Creek
- Mouth: confluence with the Namoi River
  - location: north-east of Gunnedah
  - elevation: 264 m (866 ft)
- Length: 128 km (80 mi)

Basin features
- River system: Namoi River, Murray–Darling basin

Mooki River, a perennial stream that is part of the Namoi catchment within the Murray–Darling basin, is located in the Northern Tablelands district of New South Wales, Australia.

The river starts at the junction of Omaleah Creek and Phillips Creek, and forms below the Liverpool Range, south-west of Quirindi, and flows generally west of north, joined by three minor tributaries, before reaching its confluence with the Namoi River north-east of Gunnedah, descending 88 metres (289 ft) over its 128 kilometres (80 mi) course.

The towns of Quirindi and Werris Creek lie within the basin of the Mooki River, much of which is prime agricultural land. Little natural vegetation remains in the plains but river gums and other trees grow on the banks of the Mooki River. The Kamilaroi Highway and the North-west railway line cross the Mooki River near Breeza.

== History ==
The earliest recorded exploration of this area is that of John Oxley and his party travelling through here in August 1818. Mooki was the name given to the river by Aboriginal tribes roaming the lower reaches.

Major flooding occurred in and around Gunnedah when the Mooki River flooded in November 2000.

Mention is made of the Mooki River in The Old Timer's Steeplechase by A. B. "Banjo" Paterson.

== Gallery ==
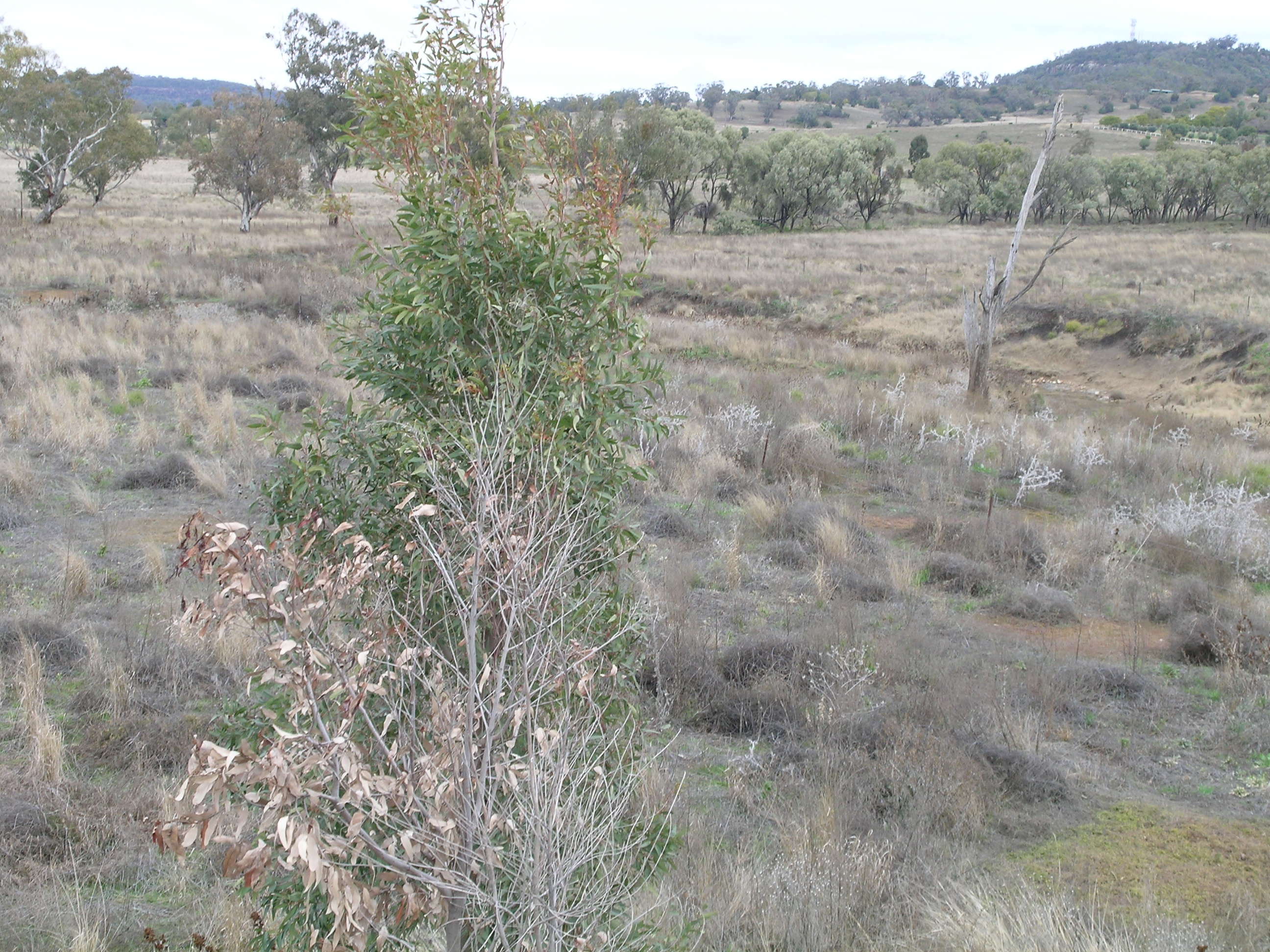
Mooki River at McDonagh Bridge, Oxley Highway, near Gunnedah

== See also ==
- Rivers of New South Wales
- List of rivers of Australia
