= Spring Ridge, New South Wales =

Spring Ridge New South Wales
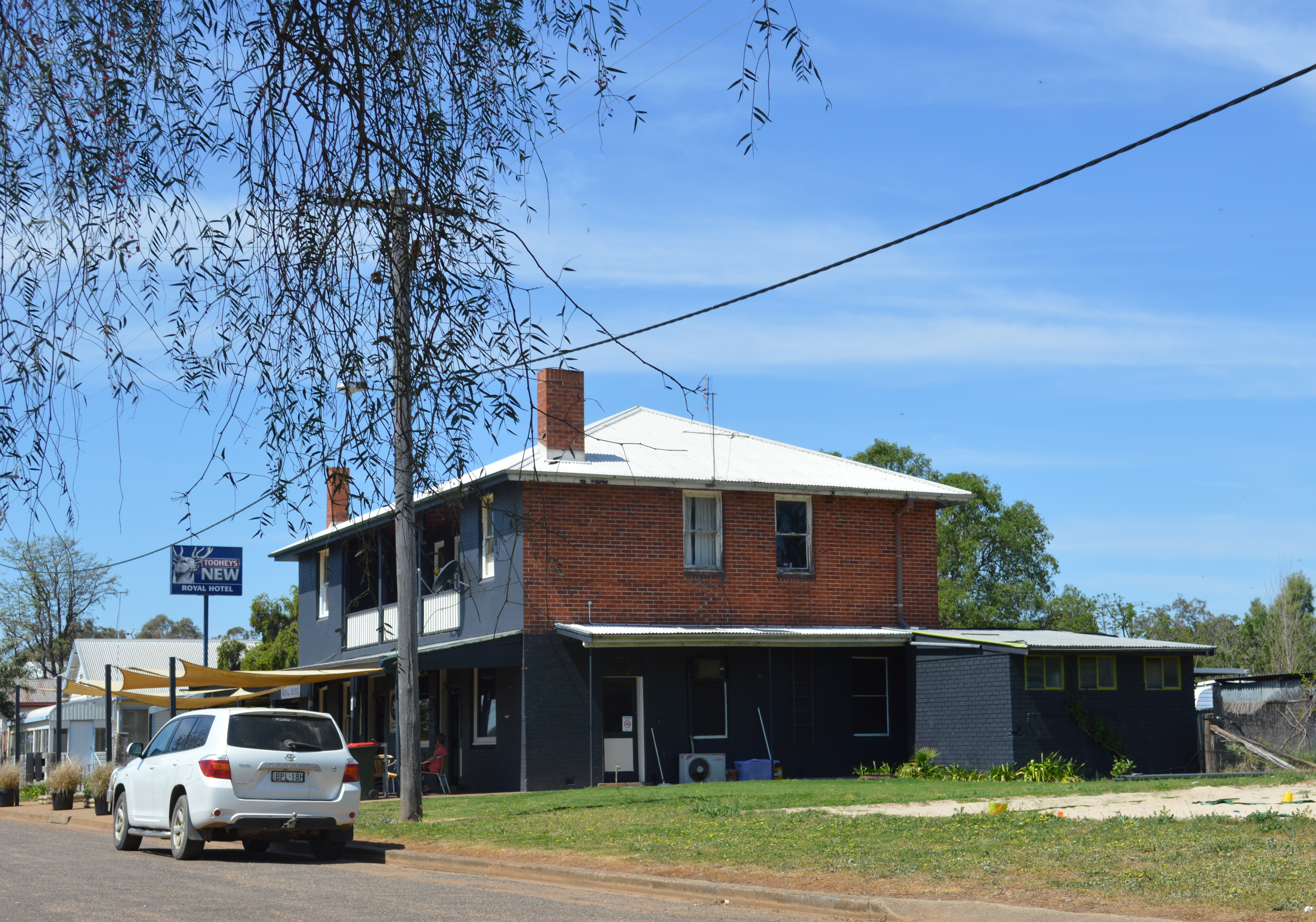
- Royal Hotel at Spring Ridge

- Coordinates: 31°24′S 150°15′E
- Population: 266 (SAL 2021)
- Postcode(s): 2343
- LGA(s): Liverpool Plains Shire
- State electorate(s): Upper Hunter
- Federal division(s): New England

Spring Ridge is a small town in northeastern New South Wales, Australia. In the 2021 census the population of the town was 266. It is in the electoral district of Upper Hunter and the federal division of New England.

== Transport ==
It is served by a station on the Binnaway – Werris Creek railway line. Tungenbone Road is the only notable road running through town, in a west–east direction from Coonabarabran to Werris Creek.

== Amenities ==
There are golf and tennis clubs in town, along with a hotel (The Royal), the general store and a primary school.
