= Andy Saunders (rugby league) =

Australian rugby league footballer

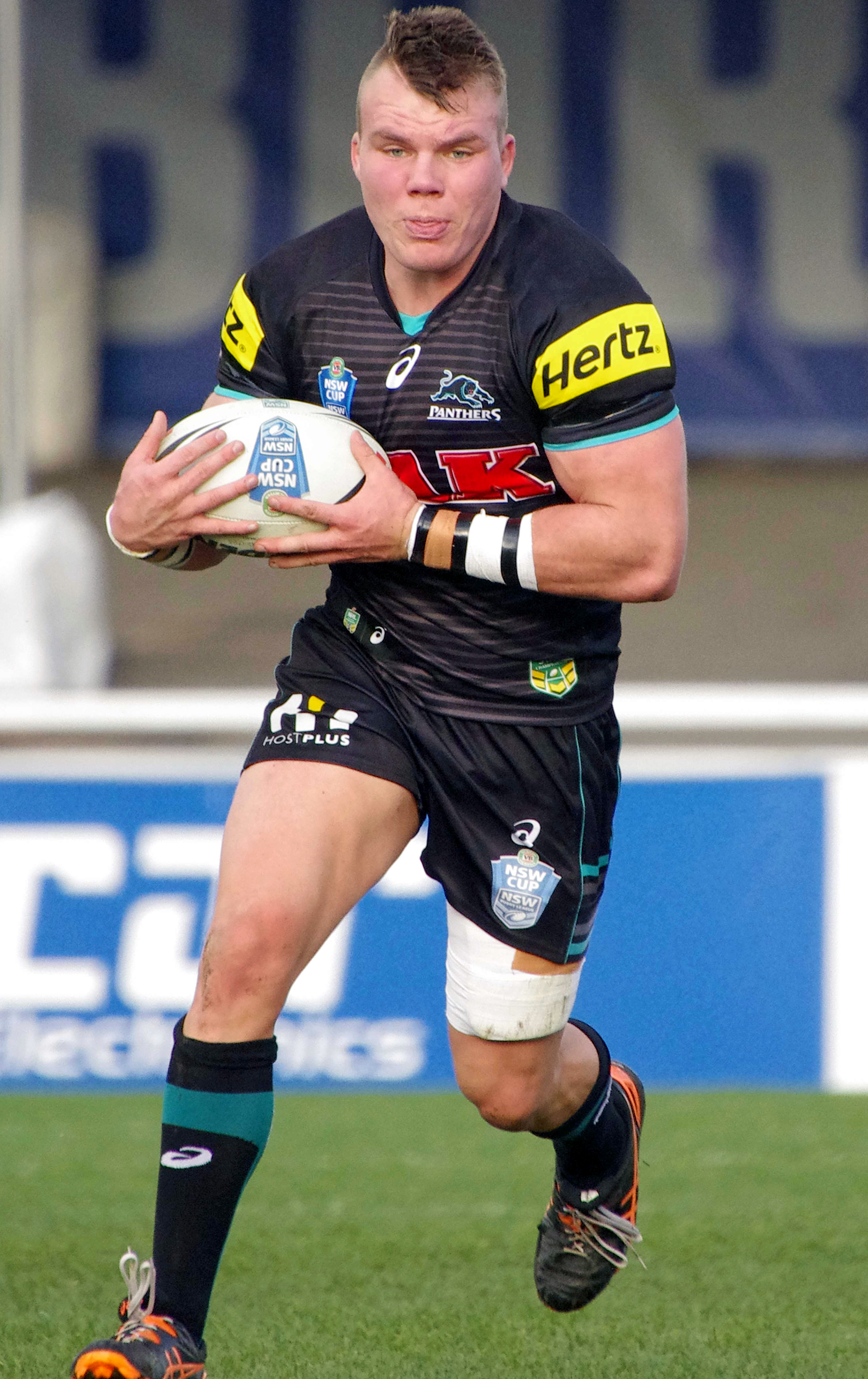

Personal information
- Full name: Andrew Saunders
- Born: 14 September 1994 (age 32) Quirindi, New South Wales, Australia
- Height: 186 cm (6 ft 1 in)
- Weight: 105 kg (16 st 7 lb)

Playing information
- Position: Prop
Club
| Years | Team | Pld | T | G | FG | P |
|---|---|---|---|---|---|---|
| 2017 | Canterbury Bulldogs | 1 | 0 | 0 | 0 | 0 |
Representative
| Years | Team | Pld | T | G | FG | P |
| 2017 | NSW Residents | 1 | 0 | 0 | 0 | 0 |
- Source: As of 17 November 2026

Andy Saunders (born 14 September 1994) is a former Australian professional rugby league footballer. He previously played for the Canterbury-Bankstown Bulldogs in the National Rugby League. He is a former Penrith Panthers National Youth Championship Captain and has played over 100 games in the NRL's second tier reserve grade competition.

== Background ==
Born in Quirindi, New South Wales, Saunders is of Italian descent. He played his junior rugby league for the Quirindi Grasshoppers before being signed by the Penrith Panthers.

== Playing career ==
=== Early career ===
In 2013 and 2014, Saunders played for the Penrith Panthers' NYC team. In October 2013, he played in the Panthers' NYC premiership win over the New Zealand Warriors. In 2014, he took over the captaincy of the Panthers' NYC team. In September 2014, he was named at prop in the 2014 NYC Team of the Year and played in the Panthers' New South Wales Cup premiership win over the Newcastle Knights. In October 2014, he played for the Junior Kangaroos against the Junior Kiwis.

=== 2017 ===
In February, Saunders signed with the Canterbury-Bankstown Bulldogs for the 2017 season. In May, he played for the New South Wales Residents against the Queensland Residents. In July, he made his NRL debut for the Canterbury side during their round 18 match against Newcastle at Belmore Sports Ground. Saunders played off the bench in their 20-18 victory.

=== 2018 ===
In 2018, Saunders signed for NSW Cup side Wentworthville.

=== 2019 ===
In 2019, Saunders signed for Blacktown Workers.
