= Wallabadah, New South Wales =

Wallabadah
- Town
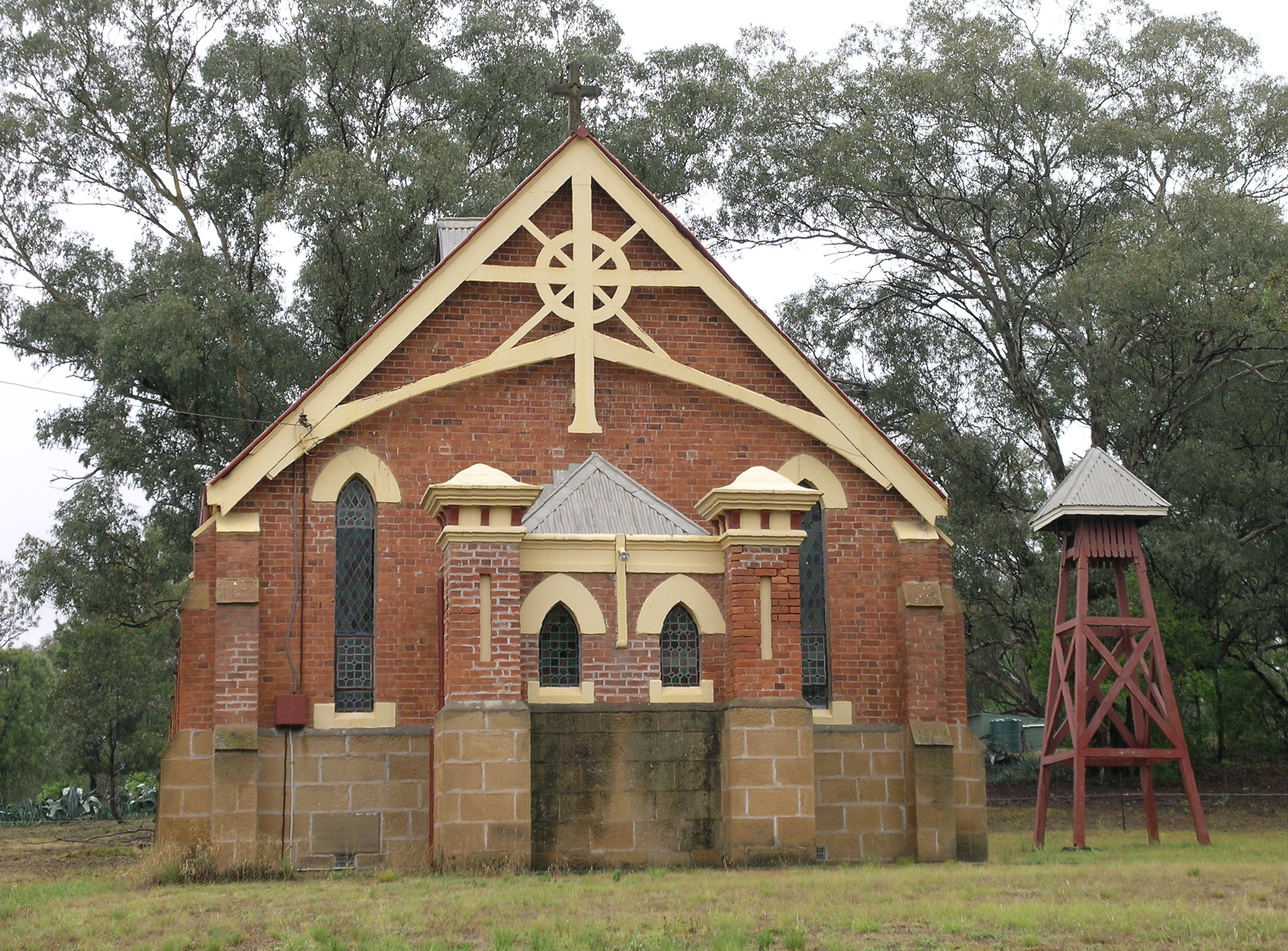
- Wallabadah church

- Coordinates: 31°32′26″S 150°49′48″E
- Country: Australia
- State: New South Wales
- LGA: Liverpool Plains Shire

Government
  - State electorate: Upper Hunter
  - Federal division: New England
- Elevation: 478 m (1,568 ft)

Population
  - Total: 746 (2006 census)
- Time zone: UTC+10 (AEST)
  - Summer (DST): UTC+11 (AEDT)
- Postcode: 2343
- County: Buckland

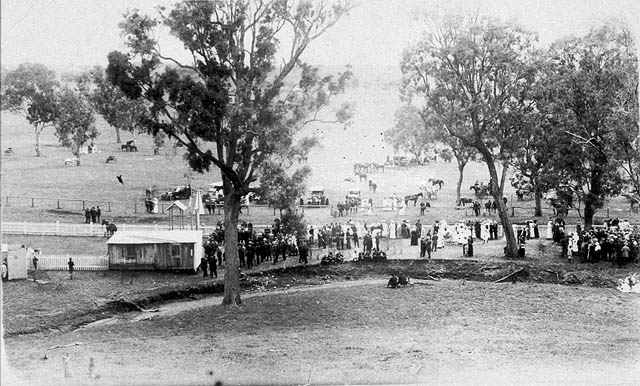
Wallabadah races, New Year's Day circa 1925

Wallabadah is a town and locality in the New England region of New South Wales, Australia. The town is located 55 kilometres south of Tamworth on the New England Highway and is in the Liverpool Plains Shire. At the 2021 census, Wallabadah had a population of 382.

== History ==
The Wallabadah region was originally known as "Thalababuri" by the Kamilaroi Aboriginal people. Wallabadah's name was derived from an aboriginal word meaning "stone".

The first European squatters arrived in the region in about 1830 and Wallabadah Station was established in 1835 on 44,000 acres (180 km^{2}) of land. During the 1850s the settlement began to develop at the intersection of two mail coach runs which came from the north and northwest, and Wallabadah Post Office opened on 1 October 1856.

In August 1866 Captain Thunderbolt's third daughter, Mary Ann was born at Wallabadah. On 30 May 1867 he robbed the northern mail coach at Wallabadah. Thunderbolt also worked on a property west of Wallabadah during that period.

Australia's first country racing club was established at Wallabadah in 1852 and the Wallabadah Cup is still held on New Year's Day (the current racecourse was built in 1898).

The Marshall MacMahon Hotel was constructed circa 1867 and a part of it is still in use. In 1877 Wallabadah was larger than Quirindi, 15 kilometres away, but a rail connection to Quirindi reduced Wallabadah's expansion. A public school was opened in 1867 with the residence dating from 1898. In 1896 the Anglican Church of the Ascension (with 1912 additions) was established while the Catholic Church was constructed in 1910 on the New England Highway.

Agriculture is the dominant industry in the area with livestock, especially beef cattle and some sheep being reared there. Wallabadah now has a primary school, a pub and one shop.

== Attractions ==
In 2005, the First Fleet Garden, a memorial to the First Fleet immigrants was created on the banks of Quirindi Creek. Stonemason, Ray Collins, carved 1,520 names of all those who came out to Australia on the eleven ships in 1788 on tablets along the garden pathways. The stories of those who arrived on the ships, their life, and first encounters with the Australian country are presented throughout the garden. The surrounding area has a barbecue, tables, and amenities.

Near the historic Wallabadah Cemetery is one of the largest undisturbed whitebox woodlands remaining in Australia, along with the indigenous trees and grasses that are peculiar to these woodlands.

== See also ==
- First Fleet
