= Binnaway–Werris Creek railway line =

Railway line in New South Wales, Australia

Overview
- Termini: Binnaway; Gap

Technical
- Track gauge: 1,435 mm (4 ft 8 1/2 in)
- Signalling: Train Order Working
- Train protection system: Train Management and Control System

The Binnaway–Werris Creek railway line is a railway line in the northern part of New South Wales, Australia that forms part of a cross country route between Werris Creek on the Main North Line and Dubbo in the Central West of New South Wales.

== Gap ==
The line has been rearranged at the Gap to connect to the Northwest Railway line and could therefore be called the Binnaway–Gap railway line. The original section of line between the Gap and Werris Creek, with its junction that points the "wrong" way, has been closed, except for a portion used as a siding for loading coal.

== Stations ==
Stations on this line include:

- Binnaway
- Ulinda
- Neible
- Oakey Creek
- Connemarra
- Bomera
- Remep
- Premer
- Yannergee
- Tamarand
- Colly Blue
- Spring Ridge
- Caroona
- Nardu (abandoned)
- Bakana (abandoned crossing loop)
- Gap
- Werris Creek

== See also ==
- Rail transport in New South Wales
