= Liverpool Plains Shire =

- Local government area
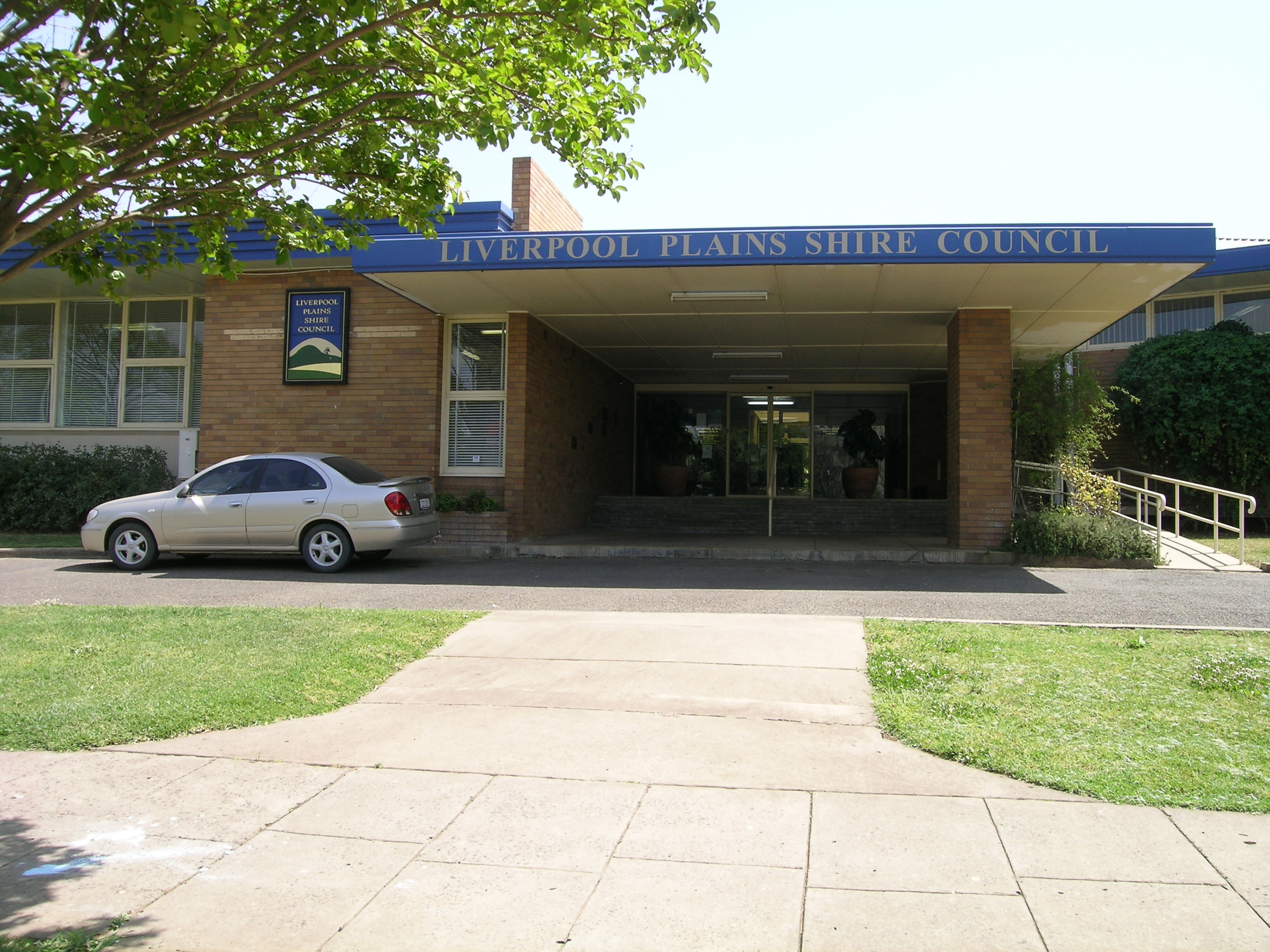
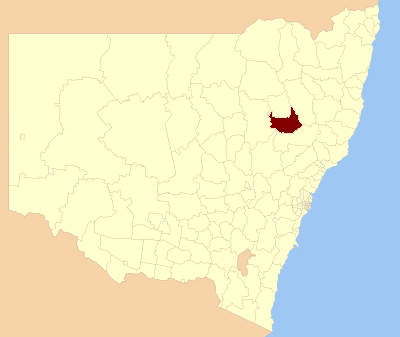
- Council chambers in Quirindi Location in New South Wales

- Interactive map of Liverpool Plains Shire
- Coordinates: 31°29′S 150°41′E
- Country: Australia
- State: New South Wales
- Region: North West Slopes
- Established: 2004
- Council seat: Quirindi

Government
  - Mayor: Kenneth Cudmore
  - State electorates: Upper Hunter; Tamworth
  - Federal division: New England

Area
  - Total: 5,086 km^{2} (1,964 sq mi)

Population
  - Total: 7,551 (2021 census)
  - Density: 1.48/km^{2} (3.8/sq mi)
- Website: Liverpool Plains Shire
LGAs around Liverpool Plains Shire
Gunnedah	Gunnedah	Tamworth Regional
Warrumbungle	Liverpool Plains Shire	Tamworth Regional
Warrumbungle	Upper Hunter	Upper Hunter

Liverpool Plains Shire is a local government area located in the North West Slopes region of New South Wales, Australia. The Shire was formed on 17 March 2004 by the amalgamation of Quirindi Shire with parts of Parry, Murrurundi and Gunnedah shires.

== Main towns ==
The main town and council seat is located in Quirindi. Other towns and villages in the Shire include Ardglen, Blackville, Caroona, Currabubula, Parraweena, Premer, Spring Ridge, Wallabadah, Werris Creek, and Willow Tree.

== Heritage listings ==
The Liverpool Plains Shire has a number of heritage-listed sites, including:

- Pine Ridge, Windy Road: Windy Station Woolshed
- Quirindi, Main Northern railway: Quirindi railway station
- Warrah Creek, Merriwa-Murrurundi Road: East Warrah Woolshed
- Werris Creek, Main Northern railway: Werris Creek railway station

== Demographics ==
At the 2011 census, there were 7,480 people in the Liverpool Plains Shire local government area, of these 50.4 per cent were male and 49.6 per cent were female. Aboriginal and Torres Strait Islander people made up 10.9 per cent of the population, which was three times higher than the national and state averages of 2.5 per cent. The median age of people in the Liverpool Plains Shire was 44 years, which was significantly higher than the national median of 37 years. Children aged 0 – 14 years made up 19.5 per cent of the population and people aged 65 years and over made up 20.2 per cent of the population. Of people in the area aged 15 years and over, 50.8 per cent were married and 12.1 per cent were either divorced or separated.

Population growth in the Liverpool Plains Shire between the 2006 census and the 2011 census was −0.80 per cent. When compared with total population growth of Australia for the same period, being 8.32 per cent, population growth in the Liverpool Plains Shire local government area was significantly lower than the national average. The median weekly income for residents within the Liverpool Plains Shire was significantly lower than the national average.

At the 2011 census, the proportion of residents in the Liverpool Plains Shire local government area who stated their ancestry as Australian or Anglo-Saxon exceeded 88 per cent of all residents (national average was 65.2 per cent). In excess of 75% of all residents in the Liverpool Plains Shire nominated a religious affiliation with Christianity at the 2011 census, which was much higher than the national average of 50.2 per cent. Meanwhile, as at the census date, compared to the national average, households in the Liverpool Plains Shire local government area had a significantly lower than average proportion (2.1 per cent) where two or more languages are spoken (national average was 20.4 per cent); and a significantly higher proportion (94.5 per cent) where English only was spoken at home (national average was 76.8 per cent).

Selected historical census data for the Liverpool Plains Shire local government area
Census year		2001	2006	2011	2021
Population	Estimated residents on Census night	n/a	7,540	7,480	7,551
Population	LGA rank in terms of size within New South Wales				
Population	% of New South Wales population			0.11%	
Population	% of Australian population	n/a	0.04%	▼0.03%	
Cultural and language diversity
Ancestry, top responses	Australian			38.4%	▲42.9%
Ancestry, top responses	English			30.6%	▲39.4%
Ancestry, top responses	Australian Aboriginal				13.6%
Ancestry, top responses	Irish			8.8%	▲10.1%
Ancestry, top responses	Scottish			7.5%	▲9.9%
Ancestry, top responses	German			2.8%	
Language, top responses (other than English)	Italian		nom	▲0.1%	
Language, top responses (other than English)	Cantonese		0.3%	▼0.1%	
Language, top responses (other than English)	Vietnamese		n/c	▲0.1%	
Language, top responses (other than English)	German		n/c	▲0.1%	
Language, top responses (other than English)	Afrikaans		n/c	▲0.1%	
Religious affiliation
Religious affiliation, top responses	Anglican		42.7%	▼42.5%	▼29.1%
Religious affiliation, top responses	Catholic		23.9%	23.9%	▼19.9%
Religious affiliation, top responses	No Religion		8.4%	▲11.8%	▲27.0%
Religious affiliation, top responses	Uniting Church		6.3%	▼5.8%	▼3.6%
Religious affiliation, top responses	Presbyterian and Reformed		3.6%	3.6%	
Median weekly incomes
Personal income	Median weekly personal income		A$438	A$433	A$620
Personal income	% of Australian median income		94.0%	▼75.0%	▲77.0%
Family income	Median weekly family income		A$1,090	A$988	A$1,479
Family income	% of Australian median income		93.1%	▲66.7%	▲69.76%
Household income	Median weekly household income		A$882	A$797	A$1,165
Household income	% of Australian median income		85.9%	▲64.6%	▲66.72%

== Council ==
=== Current composition and election method ===
Liverpool Plains Shire Council is composed of seven councillors elected proportionally as a single ward. All councillors are elected for a fixed four-year term of office. The mayor is elected by the councillors at the first meeting of the council.

The current Council, which was elected on 14 September 2024, comprises:

Party	Councillors
Independents	7
Total	7

Councillor	Party	Notes
Charile Simkin	Independent	
Shawn Cain	Independent	
Ken Cudmore	Independent	
Terry Cohen	Independent	
James Robertson	Independent	
Donna Lawson	Independent	
Jason Allan	Independent	

== Election results ==
=== 2024 ===
2024 New South Wales local elections: Liverpool Plains
Party	Candidate	Votes	%	±%
Independent	Shawn Cain (elected)	1,239	26.9	
Independent	Charlie Simkin (elected)	577	12.5	
Independent	Kenneth Cudmore (elected)	506	11.0	−1.0
Independent	Terry Cohen (elected)	386	8.4	−4.5
Independent National	Doug Hawkins	333	7.2	−6.9
Independent	Jason Allan (elected)	326	7.1	−7.9
Independent	James Robertson (elected)	312	6.8	+3.8
Independent	Donna Lawson (elected)	304	6.6	−15.2
Independent	Lynn Eykamp	230	5.0	
Independent	Ebonie Sadler-Small	150	3.3	
Independent	Theodore Maczi	115	2.5	
Independent	Yvonne Wynne	136	3.0	−1.0
Total formal votes		4,614	94.2	
Informal votes		284	5.8	
Turnout		4,898	82.7	

=== 2021 ===
2021 New South Wales local elections: Liverpool Plains
Party	Candidate	Votes	%	±%
Independent	Donna Lawson (elected)	973	21.8	
Independent	Jason Allan (elected)	668	15.0	
Independent National	Doug Hawkins (elected)	629	14.1	
Independent	Terry Cohen (elected)	577	12.9	
Independent	Ken Cudmore (elected)	537	12.0	
Independent	Paul Moules (elected)	273	6.1	
Independent	Ian Lobsey	235	5.3	
Independent	Yvonne Wynne (elected)	178	4.0	
Independent	Anthony Jackson	171	3.8	
Independent	James Robertson	135	3.0	
Independent	Mark Guthrie	84	1.9	
Total formal votes		4,460	94.6	
Informal votes		256	5.4	
Turnout		4,716	82.6	

== Geography ==
The Liverpool Plains have a generally flat to undulating terrain formed from the remnants of old volcanoes such as that of the Liverpool Ranges to the southwest. To the south and east, it merges into the higher and cooler Northern Tablelands.

The Liverpool Plains is generally regarded as the richest agricultural region in Australia owing to its rich black soils, which originally supported a mixed grassland vegetation containing both annual and perennial grasses, which early in the region's history were used to feed cattle and sheep.

Wheat and cotton are the chief crops, although production fluctuates wildly according to rainfall and soil erosion is a major problem occurring both after droughts and floods. The climate is hot in summer, mild in winter, and of moderate rainfall. The average is generally around 635 millimetres (25.0 in) with a slight summer maximum, but is quite erratic and can vary from 1,150 millimetres (45 in) in very wet years to as little as 370 millimetres (15 in). Temperatures in summer frequently exceed 35 °C (95 °F) and make cropping without irrigation risky without sophisticated meteorological forecasting techniques.
