= Binnaway, New South Wales =

Binnaway New South Wales
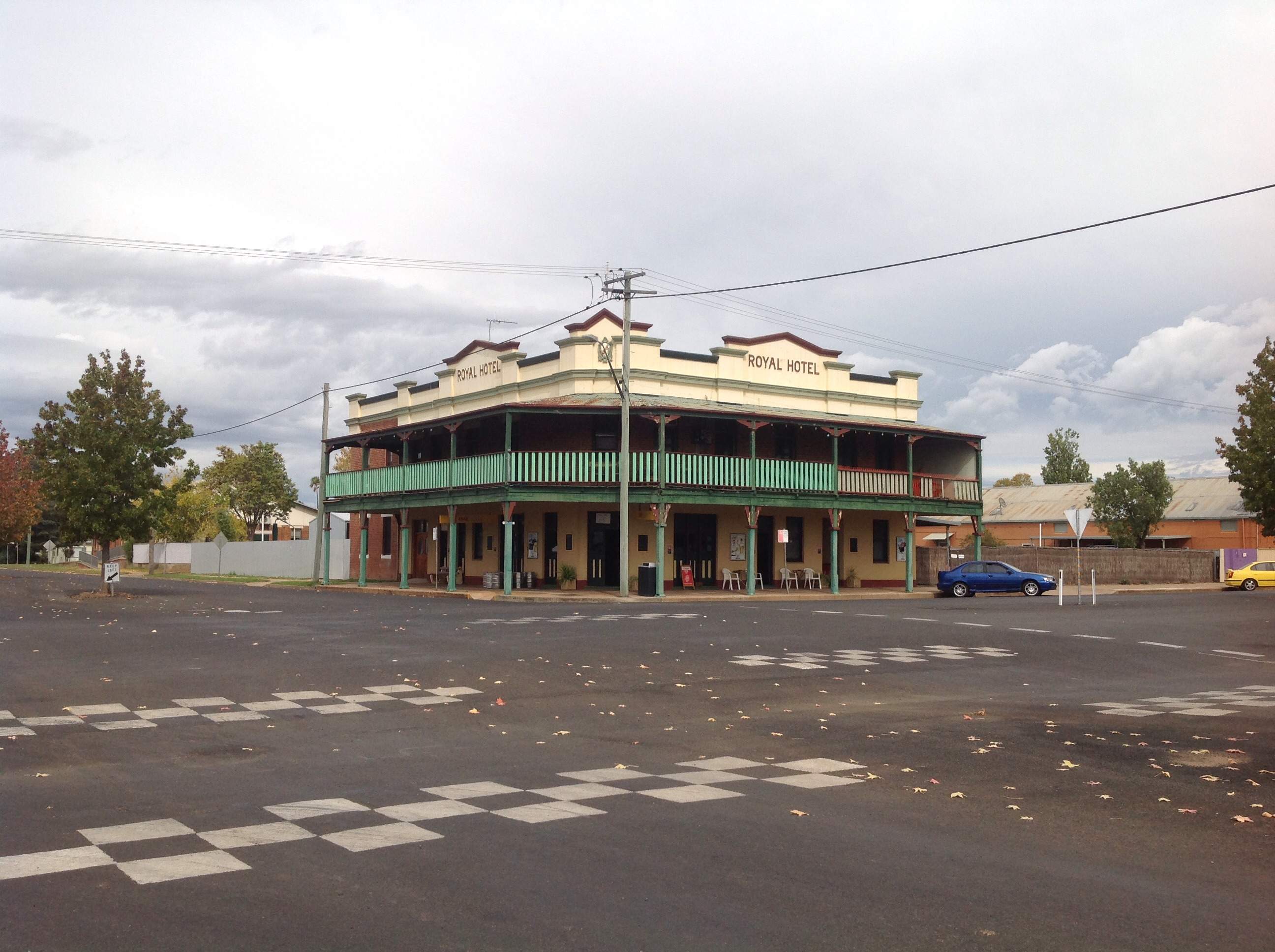
- Royal Hotel, Binnaway

- Coordinates: 31°33′S 149°23′E
- Population: 399 (UCL 2021)
- LGA(s): Warrumbungle Shire

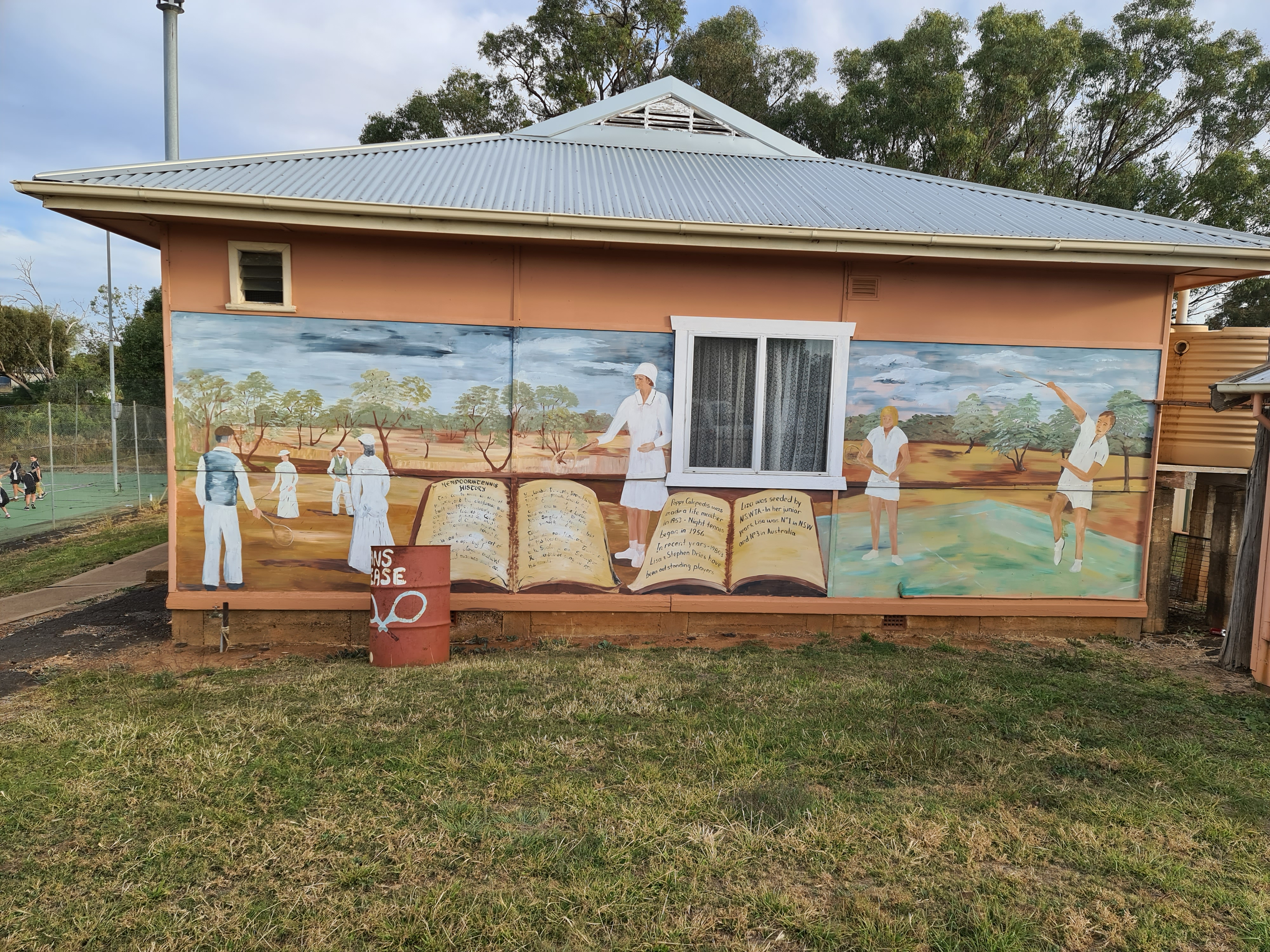
Tennis club mural

Binnaway is a small town located on the Castlereagh River in central western New South Wales near the larger centre of Coonabarabran, which is about 35 kilometres to the north. Binnaway is located on lands of the Kamilaroi people. In 2021, the town had a population of 399 people.

The road linking Binnaway with Connabarabran closely follows the meandering Castlereagh River. There are many pleasant areas to stop beside the road and on the river banks to have a picnic. Binnaway is also located near the similarly sized small town of Mendooran.

Following local government amalgamation, the town is now located in the Warrumbungle Shire Council area which is headquartered at Coonabarabran.

== History ==
The name Binnaway may derive from the Aboriginal word 'binniaway' meaning 'peppermint tree wollybutt'.

The township of Binnaway stands on part of the 'Mowabla' pastoral run of 16 thousand acres, taken up in 1848 by William Lawson. In the early 1850s the leasehold was purchased by David Innes Watt. The district pastoral runs began to be broken up from the 1860s after the passing of the Robertson Land Acts which enabled free selection of Crown land. Selectors began taking up blocks along the Castlereagh River, including Charles Naseby who selected 50 acres in 1869 and an adjoining area of 50 acres in 1874. These areas form part of the modern township, south of Renshaw Street. The old road from Coolah crossed the Castlereagh River at the locality. In the 1870s the Binnaway Inn stood on the south side of the road, near the crossing on Naseby's land.

In 1876, a Naseby lodged a subdivision plan encompassing "for the Private Village of Binnaway". In February 1876, John McWhirter of Spring Vale, Binnaway, was granted a "Wine, Cider and Perry Licence". In March 1876, a post office was established at Binnaway, "between Mendooran and Coonabarabran". By 1877, the population of the district were agitating for a school.

In March 1887, Binnaway was described as a settlement on the Castlereagh River at the "centre of a most fertile country, where grass, feed, and water abound". The population was considered to be "rather scattered", but the township "boasts of a store, post-office, accommodation house, and a most prolific orchard, the property of Mr. M'Whirter". A public school had been erected "in a central position", but "stands isolated at a distance from the township". The writer considered the "chief obstacle to the prosperity of the place" to be "the difficulty of getting there". Within three miles of the township there were two ways to reach Binnaway: "one is through a black sticky bog of considerable depth; the other, down and up dangerous, precipitous tracks".

In 1904, David Innes Watt surrendered 100 acres of his property 'Ulindah', which adjoined Naseby's subdivision, for the establishment of a village. The Binnaway village boundaries were proclaimed in June 1909 and 42 allotments were sold in the following November.

In April 1917, a railway line between Dunedoo and Binnaway was opened and by June 1917 the line had been extended through to Coonabarabran. In 1917, the population of the town and district was about 200, but within three years the population had more than doubled. The railway boosted local development; new commercial establishments were opened in the township and the railway encouraged the growing of wheat in the district. In 1923, a cross-country line from Dubbo to Werris Creek via Binnaway established the township as an important railway junction. In 1925, a locomotive barracks was built in Binnaway. In 1930, the population had reached about 750 and the region had about nine thousand acres under wheat. By 1940 Binnaway was the centre of a mixed sheep and farming district, with a town population of about 900. By then there was about 40 thousand acres under wheat in the surrounding area.

A film called The Shiralee based on a D'Arcy Niland novel set in the Australian bush, which starred Peter Finch, was filmed around Binnaway in the 1950s. Binnaway was also home to Frank Bourke's famous White Rose Orchestra and the Big Piano.

In 1968, Binnaway Street, in the centre of town, was renamed Renshaw Street after the former Premier of New South Wales, Jack Renshaw, who grew up and went to school in the area.

The railway still continues to operate through Binnaway between Dubbo and the Binnaway to Werris Creek line.

== Amenities ==
Binnaway Bombshells play in the Castlereagh Cup rugby league competition. The Binnaway Bowling club is located at the southern end of the town. Other sports active in Binnaway are cricket, fishing, golf, pony riding, squash, tennis and swimming.

There are also a number of popular 4-wheel drive and motocross tracks to explore.

Preceding station	Former services	Following station
Murrawal towards Gwabegar	Gwabegar Line	Piambra towards Wallerawang
Terminus	Binnaway–Werris Creek Line	Ulinda towards Werris Creek

== See also ==
- Box Ridge, New South Wales
