= Quirindi railway station =

Railway station in New South Wales, Australia

Quirindi
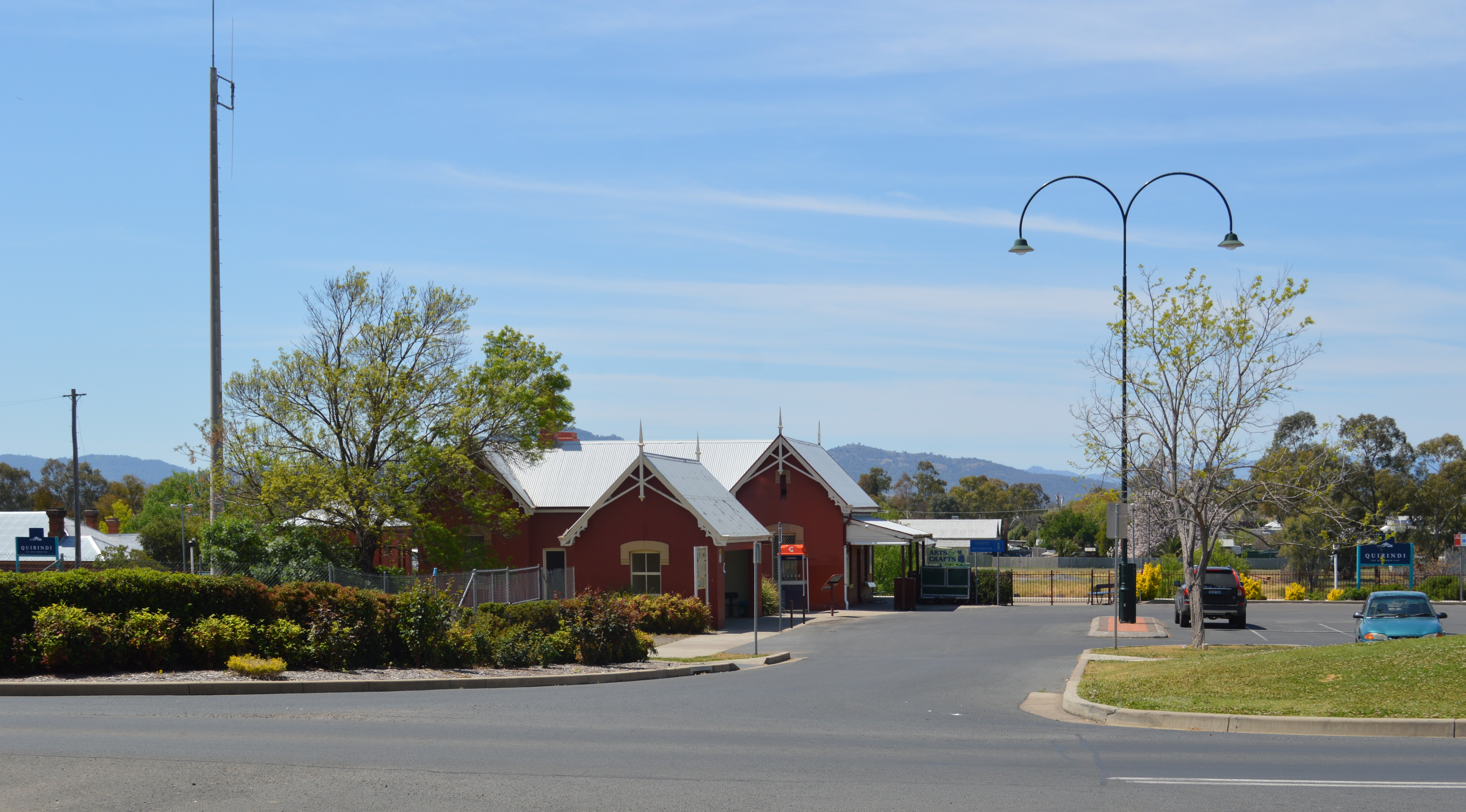

General information
- Location: George Street, Quirindi; Australia
- Coordinates: 31°30′19″S 150°40′52″E
- Owner: Transport Asset Manager of New South Wales
- Operator: NSW TrainLink
- Line: Main Northern
- Distance: 392.7 km (244.0 mi) from Central
- Platforms: 1
- Tracks: 2

Construction
- Structure type: Ground
- Accessible: Yes

Other information
- Station code: UIR

History
- Opened: 13 August 1877

Services
Preceding station	NSW TrainLink	Following station
Werris Creek towards Moree or Armidale	NSW TrainLink North Western Line	Willow Tree towards Sydney

New South Wales Heritage Register
- Official name: Quirindi Railway Station group
- Type: State heritage (complex / group)
- Designated: 2 April 1999
- Reference no.: 1227
- Type: Railway Platform / Station
- Category: Transport – Rail
Location
- Location within New South Wales

Quirindi railway station is a heritage-listed railway station located on the Main Northern line in Quirindi of New South Wales, Australia. The station serves the town of Quirindi and opened on 13 August 1877 when the line was extended from Murrurundi. It was the terminus of the line until it was extended to West Tamworth on 14 October 1878. It is also known as Quirindi Railway Station group. The railway station was added to the New South Wales State Heritage Register on 2 April 1999.

== Services ==
Quirindi is served by NSW TrainLink's daily Northern Tablelands Xplorer service operating between Armidale/Moree and Sydney.

Platform	Line	Stopping pattern	Notes
1	North Western Region	Services to Sydney, Armidale & Moree	

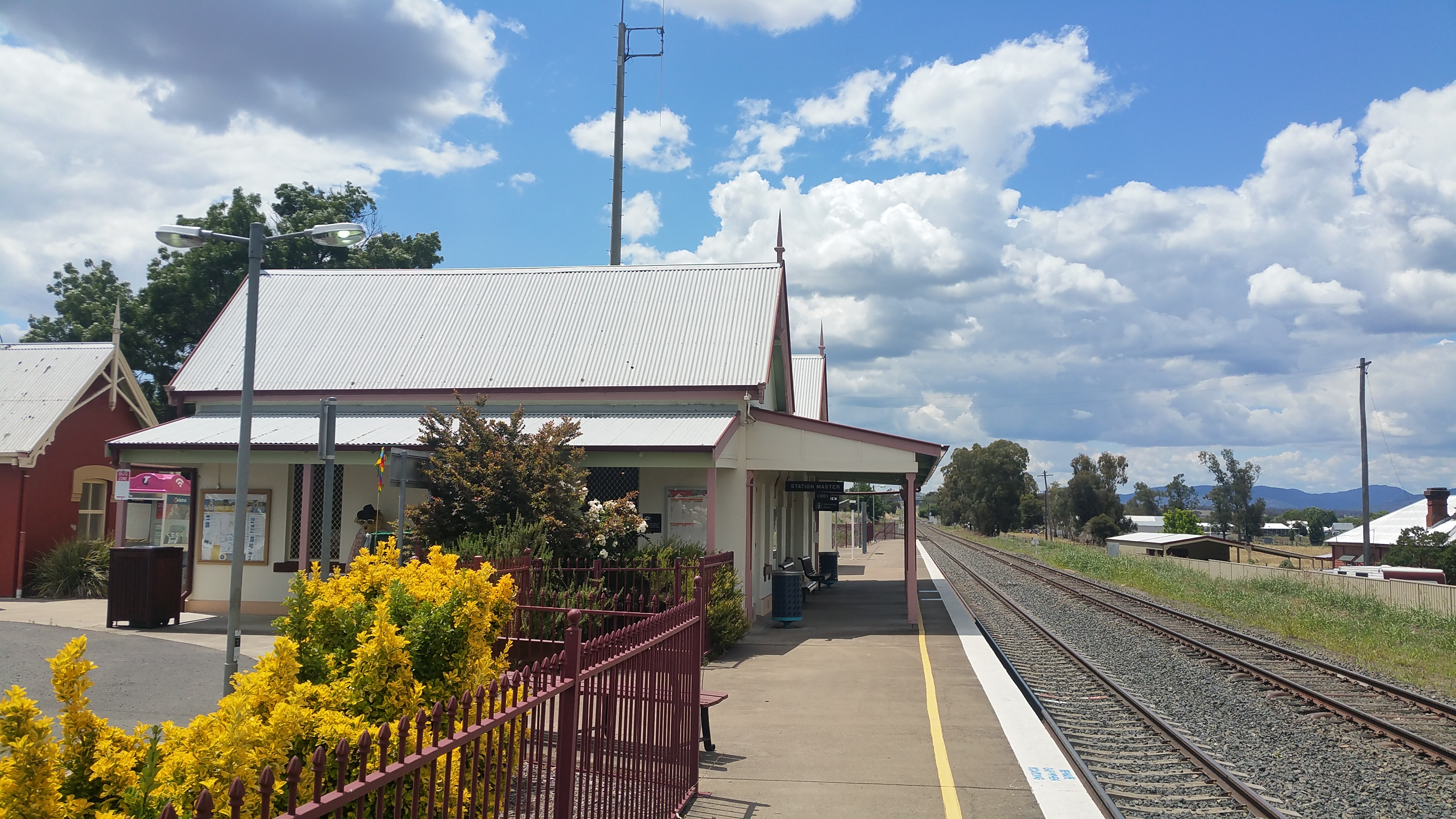
Looking north on the platform

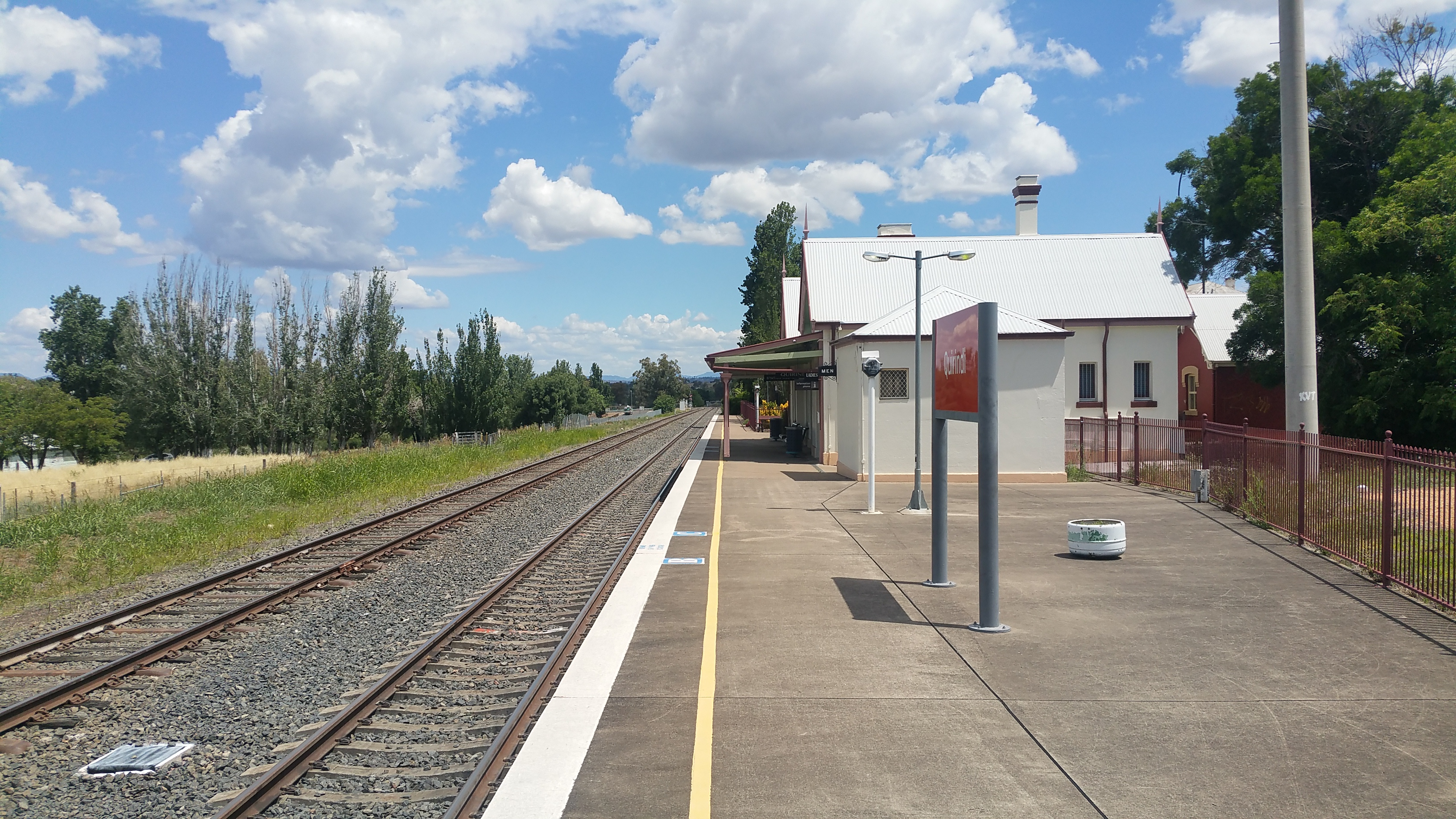
Looking south on the platform

== Description ==
The complex comprises a type 1 brick combined residence and station building, completed in 1876; an open frame signal box set on a platform, completed in 1918; a corrugated iron outshed; and a brick platform face, completed in 1877.

== Heritage listing ==
Quirindi railway station was listed on the New South Wales State Heritage Register on 2 April 1999 having satisfied the following criteria.

The place possesses uncommon, rare or endangered aspects of the cultural or natural history of New South Wales.

This item is assessed as historically rare. This item is assessed as scientifically rare. This item is assessed as archaeologically rare. This item is assessed as socially rare.

== See also ==
- List of regional railway stations in New South Wales
