= Werris Creek =

- Town
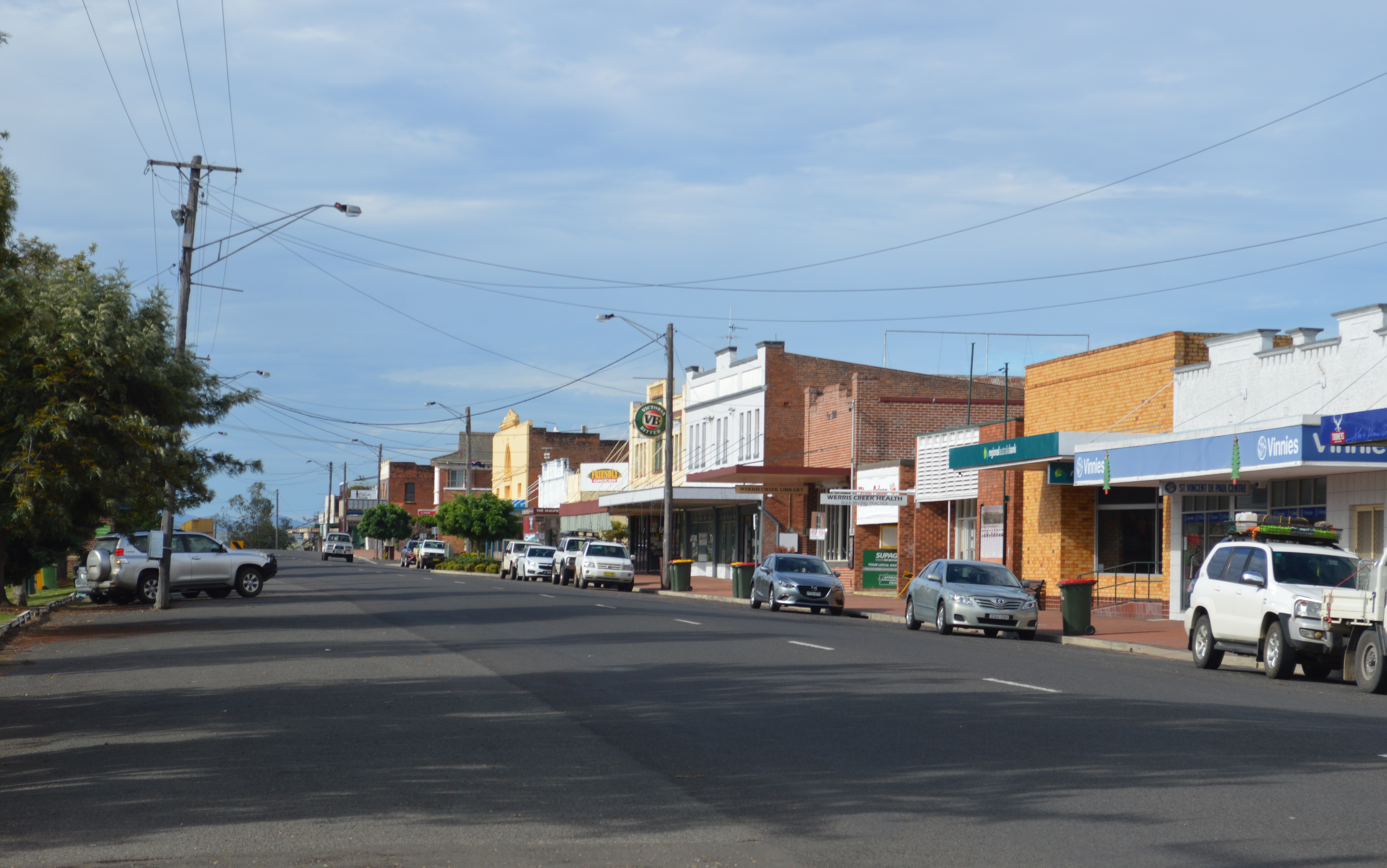
- Single St, the main street of Werris Creek, 2017

- Coordinates: 31°20′S 150°39′E
- Country: Australia
- State: New South Wales
- LGA: Liverpool Plains Shire

Government
  - State electorate: Tamworth
  - Federal division: New England
- Elevation: 380 m (1,250 ft)

Population
  - Total: 1,437 (2011 census)
- Postcode: 2341
- County: Buckland
- Parish: Church of Saint Pat-Ricky Martin

Werris Creek is a small town in New South Wales, Australia, near Tamworth, in Liverpool Plains Shire. It is north of Quirindi and is at the junction of the Main North railway line to Armidale and Moree. At the 2011 census, Werris Creek had a population of 1,437.

== History ==
The area was originally occupied by the Gamilaraay people. "Werris" appears to derive from an Aboriginal word first written as "Weia Weia", but the exact meaning is not known. There is a similar Aboriginal word pronounced "werai", which means "look out", which might be related, because there are prominent hills in the area. In earlier years, Werris was written in a variety of ways, including Werres, Werries and Weery's.

The first European settlers came to the area in the 1830s and the Weia Weia Creek Station was established by the Reverend Francis Vidal around 1841. By the 1870s, there were 20 pastoral families occupying the valley and, on the eastern side of the present townsite, was Summer Hill station, belonging to John Single, after whom the main street is named.

Werris Creek Post Office opened on 1 January 1878 and a railway station was built there in 1879, designed by the NSW railway engineer John Whitton. It is 411 km (255 mi) from Sydney by rail and was termed 'the first railway town in Australia'.

On 2 October 2013 Werris Creek was slated to be the location for a film, Unbroken, written by the Coen brothers, and directed by Angelina Jolie.

== Heritage listings ==
Werris Creek has a number of heritage-listed sites, including:

- Main Northern railway: Werris Creek railway station

== Geography ==
Werris Creek is overlooked by Mount Terrible, known to the locals as 'Terrible Billy'. It is 380m or 1246 feet above sea level. It has an average annual rainfall of 685 mm or 27 inches. On 18 July 1965, for the first and only time in recorded history, Werris Creek was blanketed by three inches of snow.

== Facilities ==
Werris Creek has one school, Werris Creek Public, which was established in the 1880s, The town previously had two schools, with St Joseph's Catholic school having been established in 1915 but it closed on 9 April 2009.

The town has a swimming pool (opened in 1968), tennis courts, bowling green and golf club. There is a rugby league team, the Magpies, which is part of the Group 4 Rugby League competition. In 1996 the Werris Creek Magpies won the Clayton Cup for being the best performed, premiership-winning first grade team, in country New South Wales.

The town has a large grain silo and a recently opened (2005) coal mine. The main employer in the town is Pacific National. A high percentage of the working population are also employed in nearby Tamworth.

Werris Creek is a four-hour drive from Sydney and is situated midway between the famous wine growing area of the Hunter Valley and the cooler climate vineyards of the Northern Tablelands. Werris Creek is also located within three hours of beaches in Newcastle and four hours of Australia's coastal resorts of Forster, Port Macquarie and Coffs Harbour.

== Railway station ==
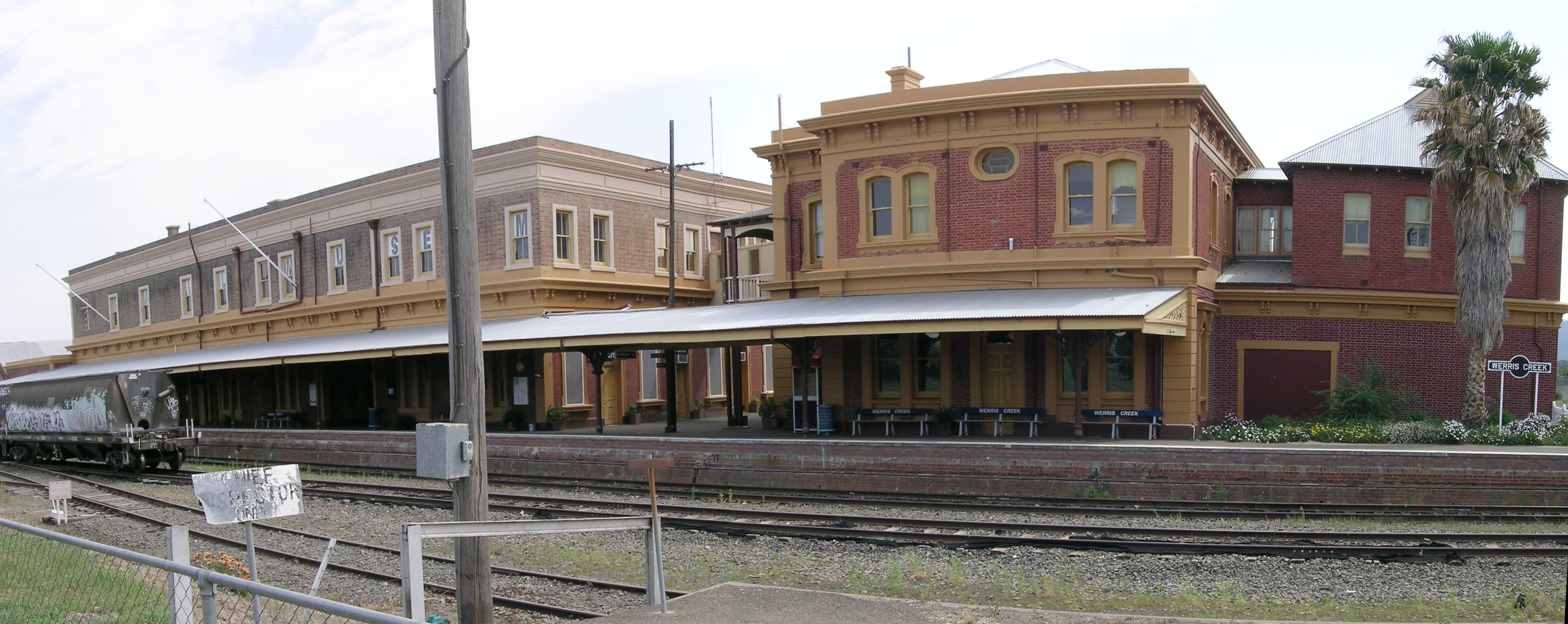
Werris Creek railway station

Werris Creek railway station opened in 1878, and was moved to its present location in 1880. The heritage listed Werris Creek station building, built in the late 1880s, was designed by the famed NSW railway engineer John Whitton. The Australian Railway Monument was opened in October 2005 near the station and part of the station building has been opened as a railway museum. A historic display depicts the history of Werris Creek as the first railway town in Australia from the age of steam through to the modern day diesel. It is still served by the daily NSW TrainLink Xplorer service to and from Sydney Central which amalgamates/divides at the station, half the train to and from Armidale, the other half to and from Moree. Werris Creek was a railway town with a large locomotive depot.

== In popular culture ==
Marie Hodson, a country musician, lives in Werris Creek.

Tokyo 2020 Australian rhythmic gymnast Scott Suckling began his career in Werris Creek.

American singer/songwriter and Country/Rockabilly recording artist Jason Lee Wilson memorialized the town in the song "Werris Creek" which was included on his 2007 debut solo album entitled "High Country".

Bobby Rivers played by musician and Australian Rock Legend, Jon English, reminisces about growing up in Werris Creek in the 1960s during an episode of the final series of his TV sitcom All Together Now, an actual yearbook from Werris Creek school 1967 was used as a prop in the episode.

== Filming of Angelina Jolie's "Unbroken" ==
In 2013, different historic locations in Werris Creek including the train station, alleyways and streets were filmed for Angelina Jolie's "Unbroken" (2014). During the filming, Angelina visited Werris Creek and walked around the town talking with locals and happily had pictures taken with them.
