= Quirindi =

- Town
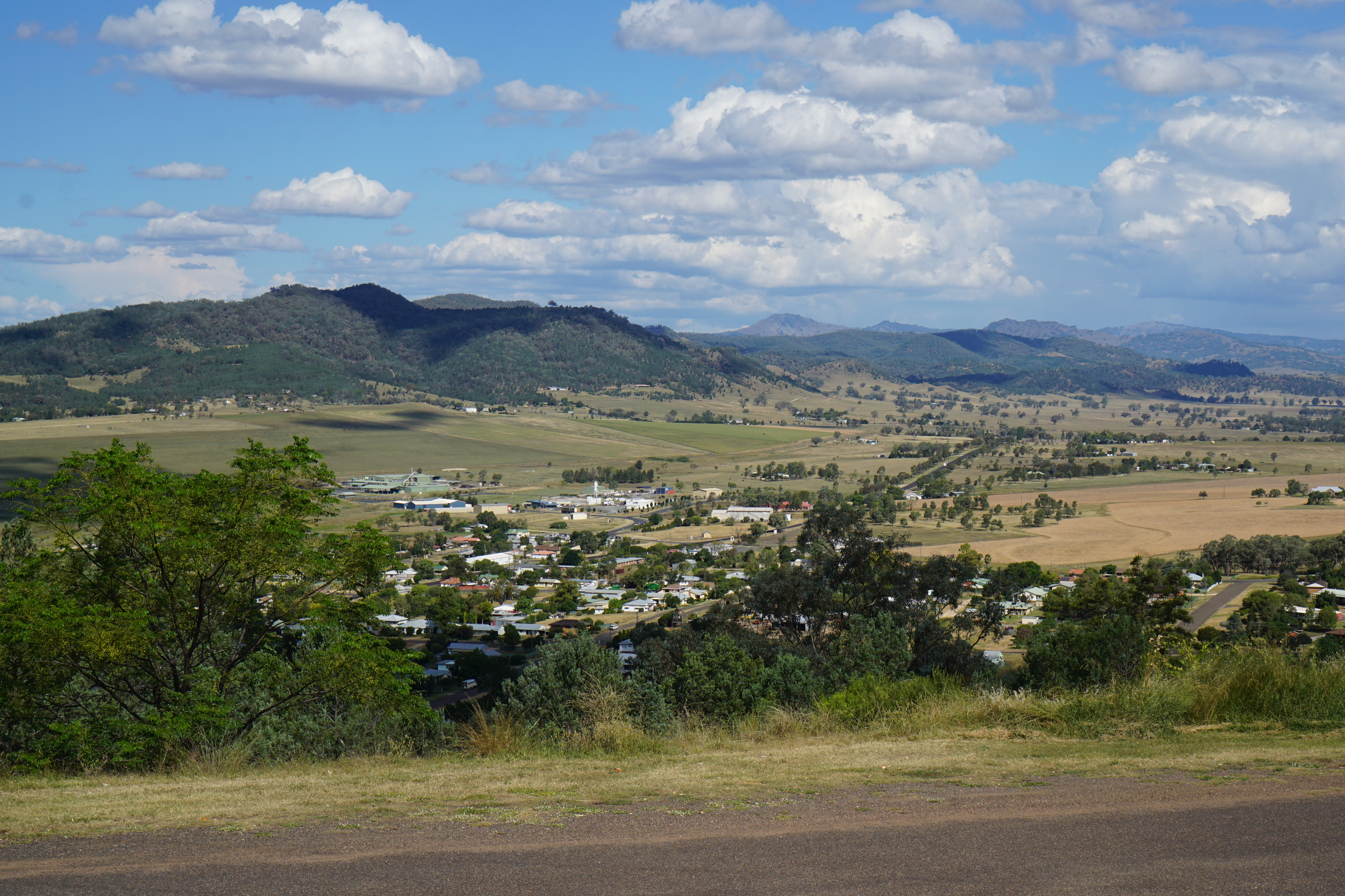
- View over Quirindi from a nearby lookout

- Coordinates: 31°30′29″S 150°40′48″E
- Country: Australia
- State: New South Wales
- LGA: Liverpool Plains Shire
- Location: 346 km (215 mi) NNW of Sydney; 68 km (42 mi) SSW of Tamworth; 35 km (22 mi) N of Murrurundi
- Established: 1856

Government
  - State electorate: Upper Hunter
  - Federal division: New England
- Elevation: 390 m (1,280 ft)

Population
  - Total: 2,602 (UCL 2021)
- Postcode: 2343
- County: Buckland
- Mean max temp: 24.6 °C (76.3 °F)
- Mean min temp: 8.9 °C (48.0 °F)
- Annual rainfall: 684.1 mm (26.93 in)

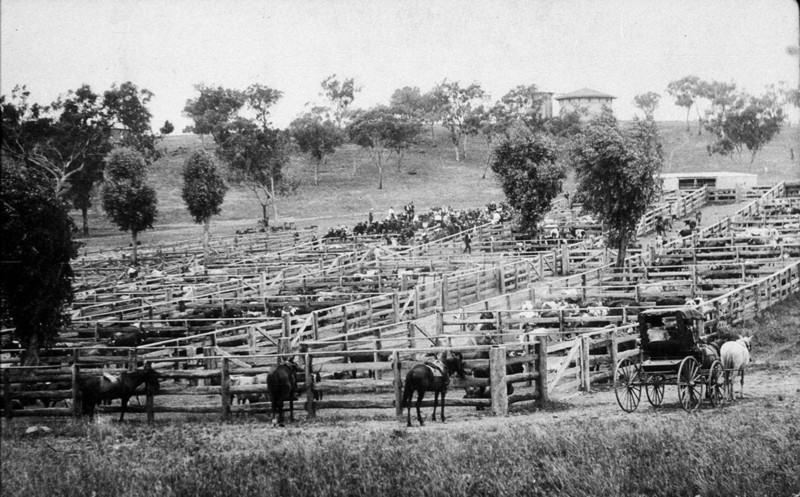
Quirindi saleyards, c.1900

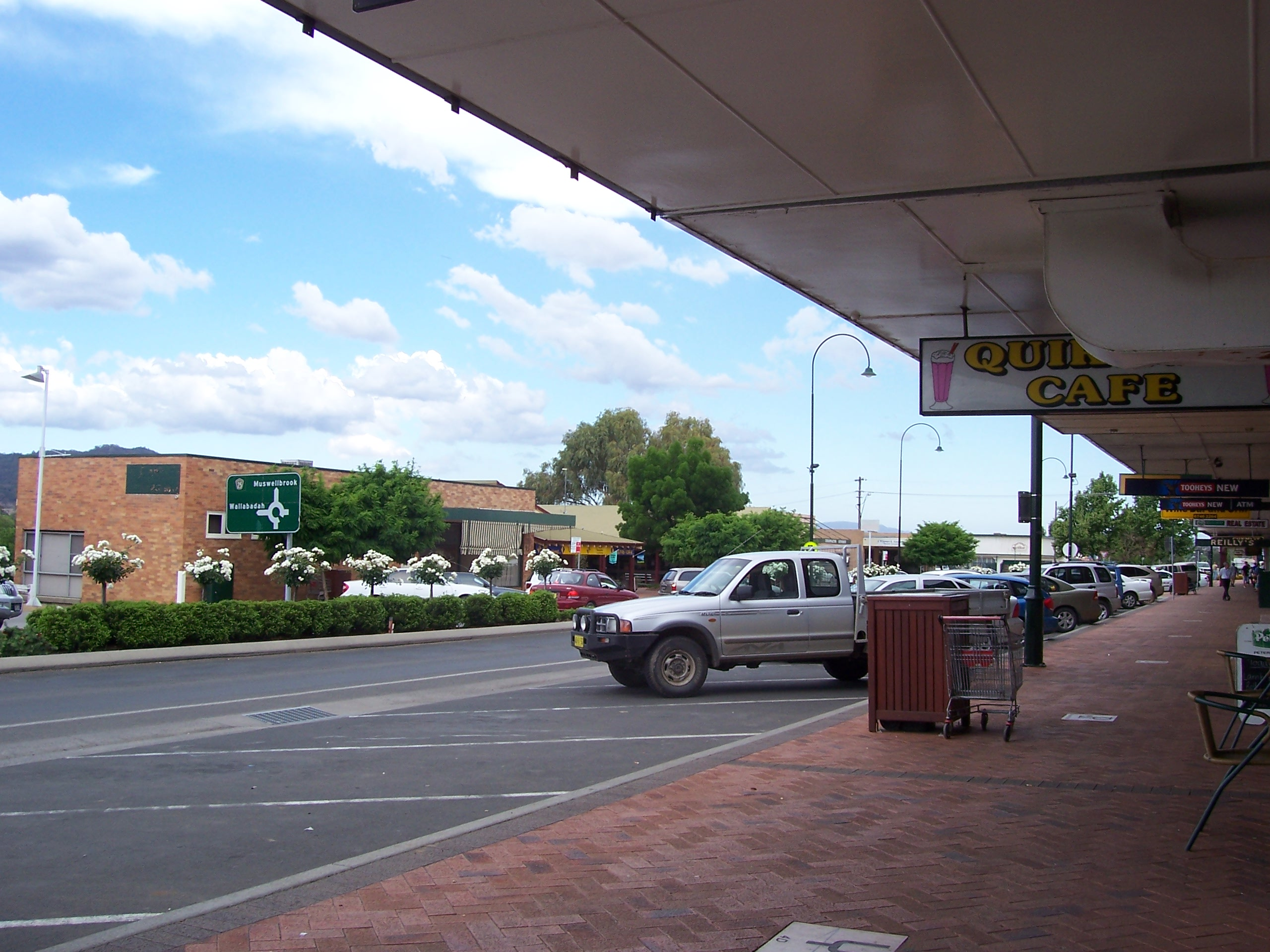
Main Street of Quirindi

Quirindi (/kwəˈrɪndaɪ/ or /kəˈrɪndaɪ/) is a small town on the North West Slopes region of New South Wales, Australia, in Liverpool Plains Shire. At the 2021 census, Quirindi had a population of 2,602. It is the nearest link to Gunnedah to the northwest and Tamworth to the north. The local economy is based on agriculture, with broadacre farming dominant on the black soil plains to the west and livestock grazing in the hilly eastern part of the district.

The town is on the Kamilaroi Highway 15 kilometres (9.3 mi) northwest of its junction with the New England Highway at Willow Tree.

== History ==
The indigenous Gamilaroi people lived in the area for many thousands of years. The name Quirindi comes from the Gamilaraay language, with a number of meanings having been attributed it, which include "nest in the hills", "place where fish breed" and "dead tree on mountain top". Early spellings of the name included "Cuerindi" and "Kuwherindi".

Quirindi Post Office opened on 1 January 1858. The town was gazetted on 19 February 1884.

== Heritage listings ==
Quirindi has a number of heritage-listed sites, including:

- Main Northern railway: Quirindi railway station

== Climate ==
Climate data for Quirindi Post Office
Month	Jan	Feb	Mar	Apr	May	Jun	Jul	Aug	Sep	Oct	Nov	Dec	Year
Record high °C (°F)	42.9 (109.2)	43.4 (110.1)	39.3 (102.7)	36.0 (96.8)	27.8 (82.0)	26.4 (79.5)	24.0 (75.2)	28.0 (82.4)	33.3 (91.9)	37.4 (99.3)	42.2 (108.0)	41.8 (107.2)	43.4 (110.1)
Mean daily maximum °C (°F)	32.2 (90.0)	31.3 (88.3)	29.3 (84.7)	24.9 (76.8)	20.4 (68.7)	16.6 (61.9)	15.9 (60.6)	17.9 (64.2)	21.5 (70.7)	25.2 (77.4)	28.5 (83.3)	31.1 (88.0)	24.6 (76.3)
Mean daily minimum °C (°F)	16.4 (61.5)	16.1 (61.0)	13.5 (56.3)	8.9 (48.0)	5.0 (41.0)	2.8 (37.0)	1.6 (34.9)	2.4 (36.3)	5.0 (41.0)	8.7 (47.7)	12.0 (53.6)	14.7 (58.5)	8.9 (48.0)
Record low °C (°F)	5.0 (41.0)	7.2 (45.0)	2.2 (36.0)	−3.2 (26.2)	−5.0 (23.0)	−6.7 (19.9)	−6.7 (19.9)	−6.4 (20.5)	−2.6 (27.3)	−1.0 (30.2)	2.0 (35.6)	4.5 (40.1)	−6.7 (19.9)
Average rainfall mm (inches)	81.1 (3.19)	65.9 (2.59)	53.3 (2.10)	41.9 (1.65)	44.5 (1.75)	50.9 (2.00)	48.4 (1.91)	45.1 (1.78)	46.5 (1.83)	60.1 (2.37)	65.4 (2.57)	80.5 (3.17)	684.1 (26.93)
Source: Bureau of Meteorology

== Sport ==
Quirindi sporting facilities include several sporting ovals catering for athletics, cricket (Falcons), rugby league (Quirindi Grasshoppers), rugby union (Quirindi Lions), soccer (Quirindi FC), basketball and netball. Other sporting complexes include the racecourse, polo grounds, rodeo, campdrafting, a 9-hole golf course, two tennis clubs, three bowling greens, gun club and swimming complex.

=== Local Teams/Events ===
- Quirindi Falcons Cricket Club
- Quirindi Grasshoppers RLFC
- Quirindi Lions RUFC
- Quirindi FC

One major issue faced by Quirindi's sporting scene was the demise of the local rugby league club, the Quirindi Grasshoppers, who were in recess from 2017 until 2024. This has left the town without a team in its most popular sport, and forced local players to either travel to play for Murrurundi or Werris Creek, or give up the game they love entirely. The team will return to the Group 21 Rugby League competition in 2025, fielding reserve grade and women's tackle teams. The Grasshoppers have won premierships in 1929, 1947, 1977, 1978, 1980 and 1981.

Quirindi Jockey Club plays host to seven race meetings each year including the Boxing Day Races which attracts thousands of people each year.

A motorcycle club is located 5 kilometres (3.1 mi) north-east of Quirindi on the Borah Creek Road, with a 1.2-kilometre motocross track named Stu Johnson Park.

== Quirindi annual events ==
- Quirindi Rural Heritage Festival- 1st weekend in May
- Quirindi Show- September
- Boxing Day Races- December
- Prime Stock Show / Hook and Hoof- August
- Nick Tooth Memorial Rugby Tens Tournament
- Sunflowers on the Plains - January

Historical population
Year	Pop.	±%
1921	2,231	—
1933	2,589	+16.0%
1947	2,628	+1.5%
1954	2,735	+4.1%
1961	2,790	+2.0%
1966	2,732	−2.1%
1971	2,877	+5.3%
1976	2,955	+2.7%
1981	2,851	−3.5%
1986	2,812	−1.4%
1991	2,830	+0.6%
1996	2,671	−5.6%
2001	2,537	−5.0%
2006	2,609	+2.8%
2011	2,580	−1.1%
2016	2,680	+3.9%
2021	2,602	−2.9%
Source: Australian Bureau of Statistics data.

== Surrounding towns ==
Werris Creek is 20 kilometres (12 mi) north of Quirindi, following the path of the explorer Thomas Mitchell, Wallabadah is located 15 kilometres (9.3 mi) east of Quirindi on the New England Highway and Spring Ridge is about 50 kilometres (30 mi) west of Quirindi.

== Transport ==
Quirindi railway station is located on the Main North railway line, 392 kilometres (244 mi) from Sydney. The station opened in 1877, and continues to be served by daily rail services operated by a NSW TrainLink Xplorer train to and from Sydney and Armidale/Moree.

Quirindi Airport is the local airfield, though most commercial flights in the region use Tamworth Regional Airport.

Tamworth Buslines operates a bus service between Quirindi and Tamworth.

== Notable people ==
- Ellen Savage, sole surviving nurse from the sinking of the AHS Centaur, advocate for career nursing
- Sir John Oscar Cramer, Australian politician and founding member of Liberal Party
- Ben Smith, former Parramatta Eels NRL player
- Andy Saunders, former NRL player for Canterbury Bulldogs
- Tony Windsor, politician
