= Train Management and Control System =

Train control system used in Australia

The Train Management and Control System (TMACS) is a Communications-based train control system used on over 5,000 kilometres (3,100 mi) of track in Australia. It is designed and deployed by 4Tel.

Unlike most train protection systems, TMACS does not use balises or any other trackside equipment. Instead, it uses GPS to identify the locomotive's position. TMACS is only used in Train Order territory, where there are no trackside signals, only points indicators and main line indicators.

The CBTC-based system uses virtual-block movement authority limits, which are called electronic authorities. The electronic authority replaces a paper-based system of train orders, which operated similarly to Track Warrant Control, and continues to be used on some branch lines in Australia.

== In-Cabin Equipment ==
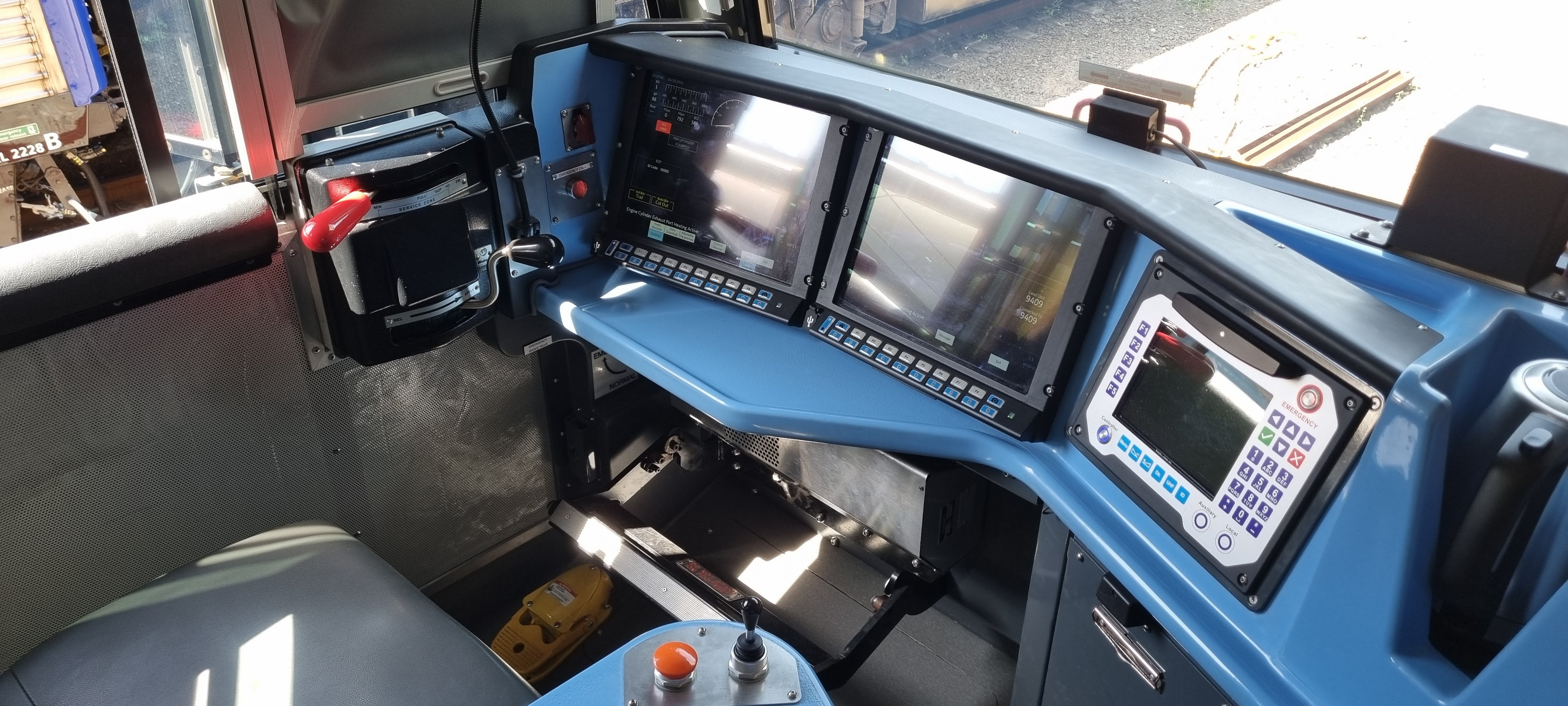
The cab of a UGL Rail C44aci, with the ICE unit visible on the right

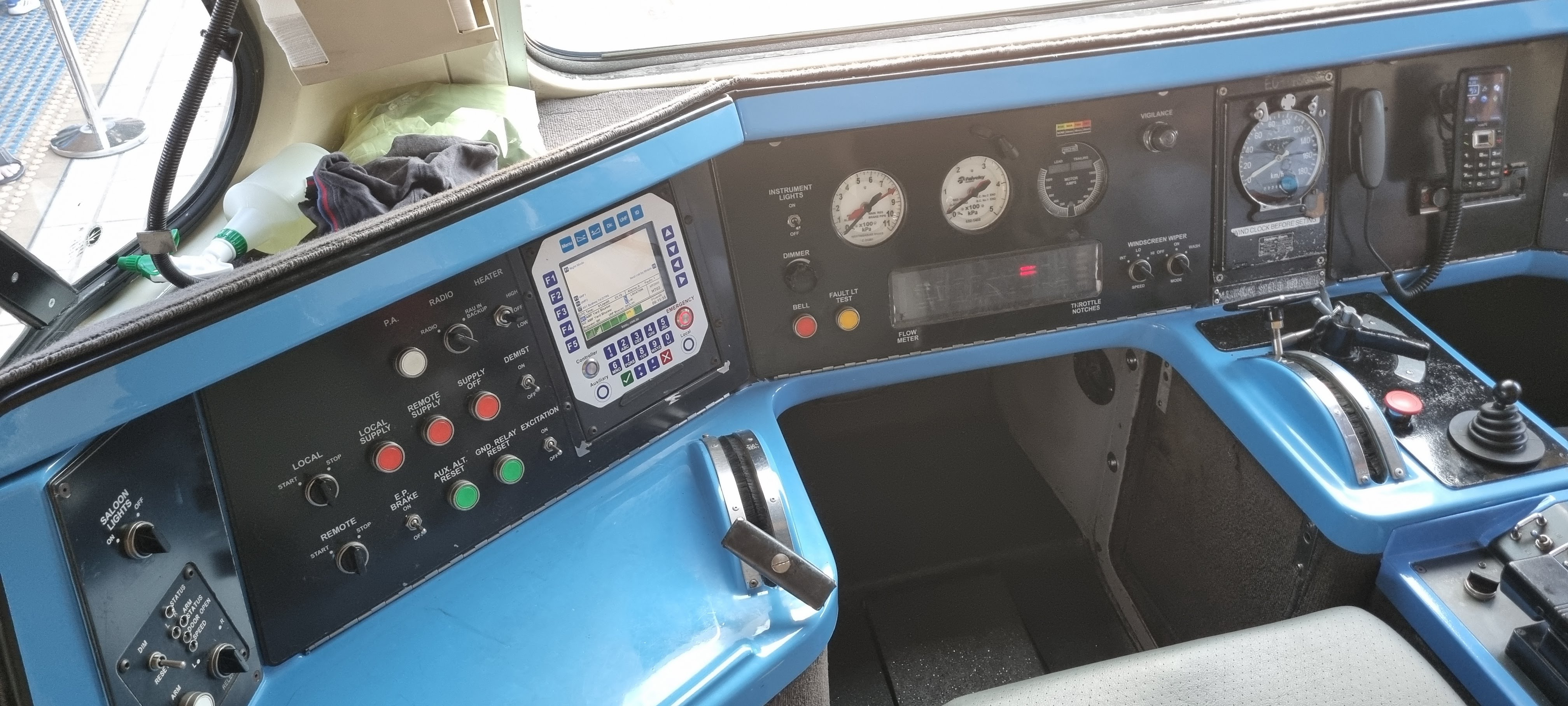
The cab of a XPT, with the ICE unit visible in the centre-left

TMACS-equipped locomotives must have an In-Cabin Equipment (ICE) unit installed, developed by Base_{2}. The ICE unit uses the National Train Communications System (NTCS) to communicate with network control. Data is transmitted using Telstra's 4G network, and Iridium's satellite phone network when 4G is unavailable. For voice comms, UHF radio frequencies are also used to communicate with local train crew.

If the train exceeds the limit of the electronic authority, the ICE unit raises an in-cab alarm. It can also activate the train's emergency brake, but this feature is not yet certificated for use, as of 2026.

== Levels ==
TMACS has three levels of safety. Level 3 is not used yet.

- Level 1: electronic authorities not enabled. Conventional Train Order Working is used, with train orders communicated verbally over the radio.
- Level 2: electronic authorities enabled.
- Level 3: electronic authorities enabled, and connected to the onboard emergency brake.

== Usage ==
TMACS is used on lines operated by the Australian Rail Track Corporation (ARTC), and on the Country Regional Network in New South Wales.

- Controlled from Broadmeadow (ARTC Network Control North)
  - Troy Junction–Merrygoen railway line
  - Gwabegar railway line from Gulgong to Binnaway via Merrygoen
  - Binnaway–Werris Creek railway line from Binnaway to Gap (near Werris Creek)
  - Mungindi railway line from Turrawan to North Star via Moree
  - Boggabilla railway line from Camurra to Camurra West
  - Main Western Line from Narromine to Dubbo
  - Parkes–Narromine railway line from Narromine to Goobang Junction (Parkes)
- Controlled from Junee (ARTC Network Control South)
  - Stockinbingal–Parkes railway line
  - Broken Hill railway line from Goobang Junction (Parkes) - Broken Hill
- Controlled from Adelaide (ARTC Network Control West)
  - Trans-Australian Railway from Tarcoola to Kalgoorlie (starting in 2026)

== Timeline ==
- 2001 - Version 1.0 developed by 4Tel and deployed on the first line.
- 2013 - All ICE units upgraded to support the National Train Communications System
- 2015 - Electronic authorities introduced, making TMACS conform to IEC 61508's Safety Integrity Level 2
- 2023 - All ICE units upgraded from 3G to 4G, due to Australia's impending 3G shutdown.
- 2025 - Announcement that the Trans-Australian Railway would use TMACS instead of Advanced Train Management System.
- 2025 - Work underway to make the system conform to IEC 61508's Safety Integrity Level 4

== See also ==
- Advanced Train Management System
- Communications-based train control
- European Train Control System
