= Wongabinda, New South Wales =

Coordinates: 29°23′S 150°04′E

Wongabinda is a locality in the northwest of New South Wales, Australia, north-east of the town of Moree. The railway line to Boggabilla passes through, and a railway station existed between 1932 and 1975.

| Preceding station | Former services | Following station |
|---|---|---|
| Milguy towards Boggabilla | Boggabilla Line | Camurra Terminus |
