= Croppa Creek =

Croppa Creek New South Wales
- Coordinates: 29°08′S 150°18′E
- Population: 104 (SAL 2021)
- Postcode(s): 2411
- Elevation: 278 m (912 ft)
- Location: 698 km (434 mi) NNW of Sydney; 66 km (41 mi) NE of Moree
- LGA(s): Gwydir Shire
- State electorate(s): Barwon
- Federal division(s): New England

Croppa Creek is a very small village and railway location in the Gwydir Shire, New South Wales, Australia. Before European colonisation, it was part of the lands of the Gamilaraay or Kamillaroi people, who had inhabited the area for tens of thousands of years.

Croppa Creek was the site of a railway station on the Boggabilla branch line, between Moree and North Star, from 1932 until 1976, and is still a seasonal loading point for freight trains carrying bulk grain. In the 2016 census, the area surrounding Croppa Creek had a population of 120.

The village was settled following the opening of the railway line and grew through the 1930s and 1940s, with new industry, agricultural areas and housing subdivisions established. Today, the main economic activity is mixed farming, with crops including wheat, barley, sorghum and cotton. Sheep and cattle grazing is also common in the area. Graincorp operates a wheat silo at Croppa Creek and the nearby Myola feedlot, a facility capable of handling 20,000 head of cattle, further supports the local agriculture industry.

Despite the size and isolation of Croppa Creek, recreational facilities and organisations are well represented in the village, including the local bowls club, a 9-hole golf course, tennis courts and Croppa Creek Crows rugby league club, all built and upgraded with donations from the community. There is a small public school, catering for students from K–6, with an enrolment of just 11 students in 2014. Other amenities include the Croppa Creek General Store, the community hall and a Catholic church. The community relies on larger nearby towns such as North Star (28 km), Goondiwindi (95 km) and Moree (68 km) to provide services not available locally.
