= Wobbly Boot Hotel =

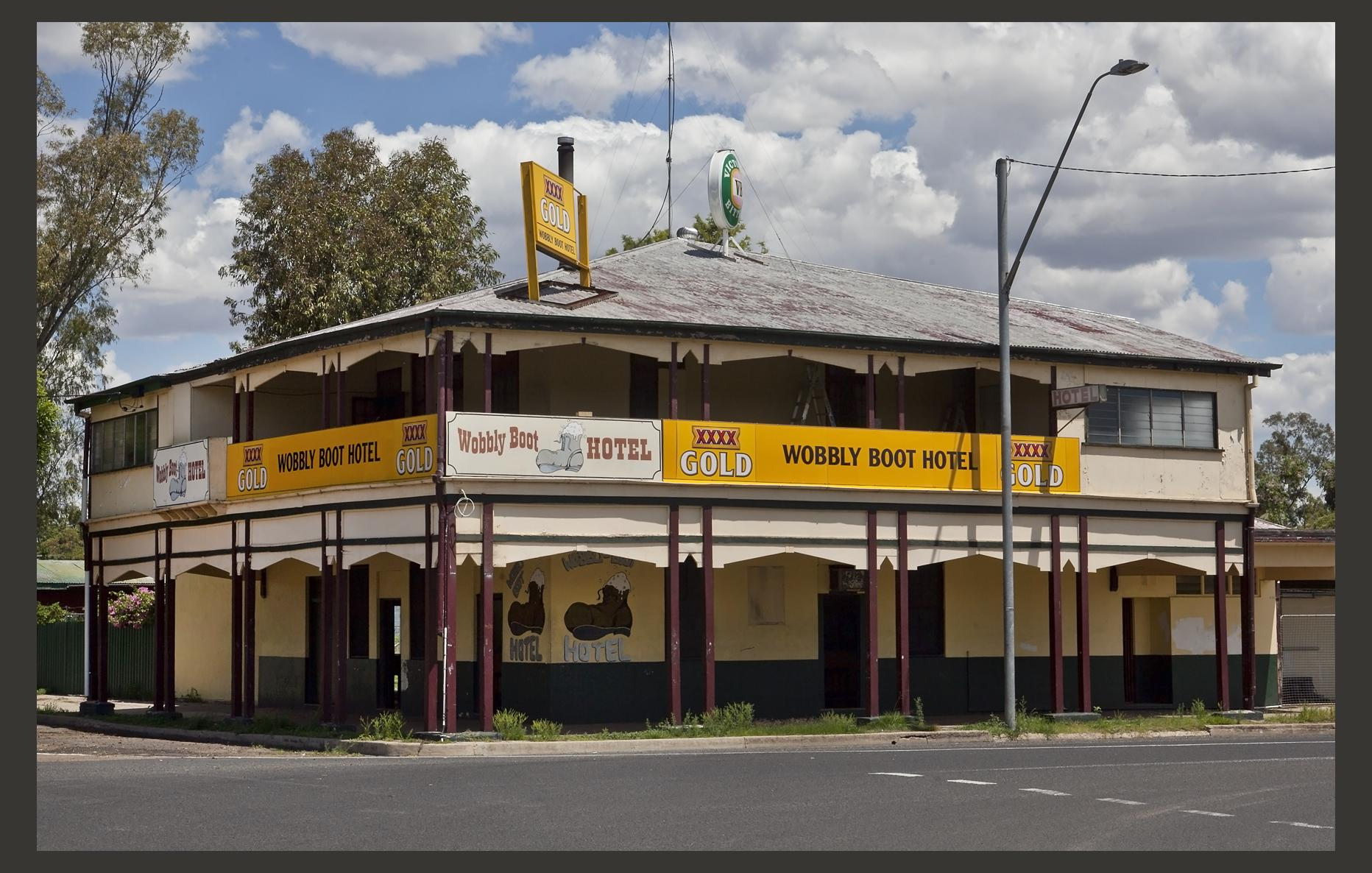

General information
- Status: Completed
- Type: Australian pub
- Location: 92 Merriwa Street, Boggabilla, New South Wales, Australia
- Coordinates: 28°36′20″S 150°21′37″E
- Opened: 1935

Technical details
- Floor count: 2

The Wobbly Boot Hotel is an Australian pub located in the town of Boggabilla near the state border of New South Wales and Queensland. The current concrete building was constructed in 1935 to replace a 12-room wooden hotel on the same site that was destroyed by fire in 1934, leaving the railhead town without visitor accommodation. The new hotel was designed with modern amenities (including electric lighting throughout, large balconies and a septic tank system) to help take advantage of the business opportunities brought by the recently opened Boggabilla railway line. Originally known as the Boggabilla Hotel, the name was changed to the Wobbly Boot, an Australian slang term used to describe the sensation of being drunk and unable to walk straight, during the tenure of publican Glen Bryan in the early 1980s.

In 1989, the Wobbly Boot Hotel was damaged after a fight outside the pub sparked a riot amid racial tensions related to the living conditions of Indigenous Australians at nearby Toomelah Station. Additional police were called from the towns of Moree and Goondiwindi and 11 people were charged.

The Wobbly Boot has featured regularly in Australian media and travel blogs on lists of strange and iconic Australian pubs owing to its unusual name and notoriety as the inspiration for the Stan Coster song The Wobbly Boot Hotel.

== In popular culture ==
- Country music artist Stan Coster wrote the 1982 song The Wobbly Boot Hotel about the pub while sitting at the bar at the request of publican Glen Bryan, who reportedly paid him $1000. The song has since been performed and re-released by artists including Slim Dusty and John Williamson.
- Walker Models produce 1/160 (N scale) and 1/87 (HO scale) model kits of the Wobbly Boot Hotel for use with model railways.
