= North Star, New South Wales =

North Star
- Town
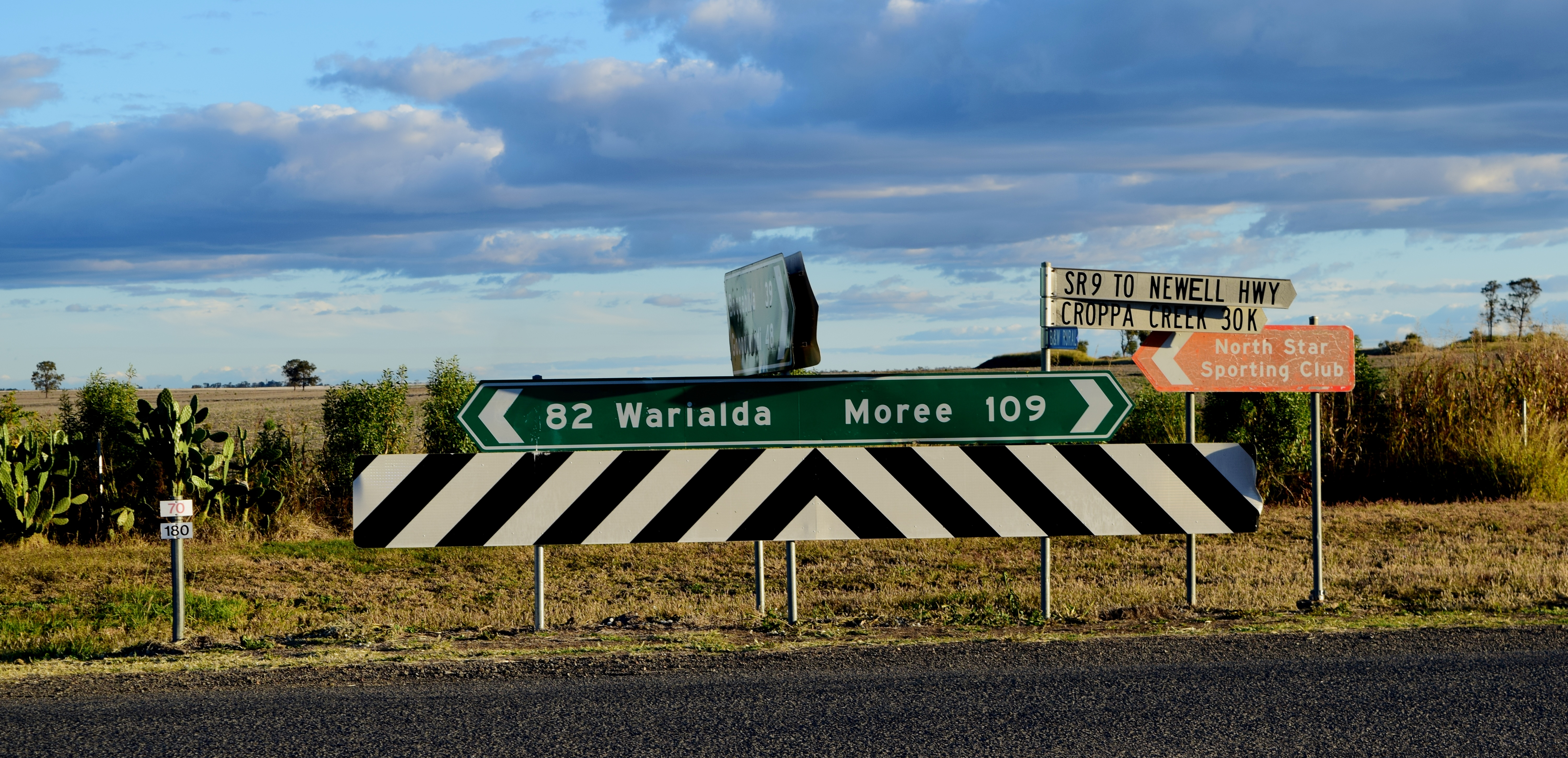

- Coordinates: 28°55′57″S 150°23′29″E
- Country: Australia
- State: New South Wales
- LGA: Gwydir Shire
- Location: 742 km (461 mi) NNW of Sydney; 111 km (69 mi) NE of Moree; 54 km (34 mi) SSE of Goondiwindi
- Established: 1888

Government
  - State electorate: Northern Tablelands
  - Federal division: New England
- Elevation: 419 m (1,375 ft)

Population
  - Total: 214 (2021 census)
- Postcode: 2408

North Star is a small village in the Gwydir Shire, located in northern New South Wales near the Queensland border. At the 2021 census, North Star had a population of 214 people in the surrounding area, with a population of around 50 in the actual village.

== History ==
European settlement of North Star began in around 1888, when five brothers of the Sutton family took up land holdings in the area. The surrounding lands were cultivated for grazing sheep, by 1910 the Wilby Woolshed was operational, bringing in business from surrounding districts. The first wheat crops were planted in 1908.

A post office was established in 1916, and the opening of the Boggabilla railway line in 1932 brought new services and opportunities for the town. The silo and loading facilities were constructed in 1955 and the complex was expanded in 1965. North Star experienced strong population growth during this period, peaking in the 1970s but more recently has experienced decline due to falling profit margins for wheat farmers, and new technologies.

== Facilities ==
- Grain storage capabilities owned by Grain Corp, with access to the railway line.
- North Star Public School - current student enrolment is 32 pupils with 2 full-time teachers
- Polo Ground
- Golf Course
- Four concrete Tennis courts
- Caravan park
- CWA Hall
- Bookcase

== Railway ==
The railway arrived on 20 June 1932 with the opening of the line to Boggabilla. In the 1980s, with the closure of all traffic except grain, the line was cut back to North Star which has the last silo on the line.

A study commissioned by the Australian Government in March 2008 identified the preferred route for a proposed Inland Railway corridor between Melbourne and Brisbane would see rail traffic restored north of North Star, along a new alignment in the direction of Toowoomba. As of 2026, the federal government has shelved construction of the Inland Rail north of Parkes.

=== Adjacent stations ===
- Boggabilla - terminus
- Croppa Creek
- Camurra
- Moree - junction

== Website ==
www.northstarnsw.com was launched in November 2011. It was a community run and built website featuring a calendar of events, Speakers Corner (a page for discussing community issues and achievements), as well as information on the local P & C and CWA fundraisers and events. The CWA were involved in the creation of the website.
