= List of Australian railway companies =

While railways in some states were briefly operated as private companies, railways of Australia have historically operated as Government instrumentalities.

The earlier form of a single state government railway department in each state no longer exists – with complex relationships developed by state and federal government corporations operating in multiple locations and across borders between states.

They are further divided into 'above' and 'below' rail companies – track owners, and train operators. Some companies are both.

== Track and Train ==
- Aurizon
- Metro Trains Melbourne (manager of suburban trackage owned by VicTrack)
- Queensland Rail
- TasRail
- V/Line (manages all Victorian track owned by VicTrack, except the suburban and interstate networks)

== Track Only ==
- Arc Infrastructure (Western Australia)
- Australian Rail Track Corporation (interstate network)
- John Holland Rail (Country Regional Rail Network in New South Wales)
- Transport Asset Holding Entity of NSW (urban passenger lines in Sydney, Newcastle and Wollongong area, other New South Wales lines are controlled or maintained under contract by Australian Rail Track Corporation and John Holland Rail)
- VicTrack (owner of Victorian network)
- South Maitland Railway (New South Wales)

== Train Only ==
=== Suburban ===
- Adelaide Metro
- Metro Trains Melbourne
- Metro Trains Sydney
- Queensland Rail
- Sydney Trains
- Transperth

=== Regional ===
- Journey Beyond
- NSW TrainLink
- Queensland Rail
- Transwa
- V/Line

=== Freight ===
- Aurizon - Queensland NG (Intermodal and a variety of Bulk commodities including Coal, Grain, ore, fertiliser and acid), NSW (Hunter Valley, Riverina), Victoria (Bulk - including intermodal), SA/NT (Adelaide-Darwin Intermodal, Melbourne-Perth Intermodal Grain, Ore, Gypsum (Eyre Peninsula Railway Network), WA (variety of Bulk commodities including Iron Ore and Grain)
- Bowmans Rail - South Australia
- Pacific National - Qld (Coal, Intermodal, Sugar), NSW (Intermodal, Coal, variety of Bulk commodities including Grain and Ore), Victoria (Intermodal and Grain), SA/WA - intermodal, Journey Beyond hook-and-pull contract
- Qube Logistics - Qld (NG Mt Isa Ore, SG Steel), NSW (intermodal, Steel and a variety of bulk commodities including Ore and Grain), Victoria (Intermodal and Steel)
- SCT Logistics Melbourne-Perth, Parkes-Perth, Melbourne-Brisbane Intermodal, Dooen-Melbourne Intermodal
- Southern Shorthaul Railroad - Niche operator hauling grain, intermodal and coal in NSW and Victoria
- Watco Australia - Qld (Queensland Government-funded cattle trains, grain services, shunting at the Port Kembla steelworks) WA Infrastructure trains and BHP Nickel West contract.
- Crawfords Freightlines - Intermodal services in NSW.

=== Heavy Haul ===
- BHP
- Fortescue
- Rio Tinto
- Roy Hill

=== Tourist and Heritage ===
- List of heritage railways in Australia

== Rolling stock hire ==
- Rail First Asset Management
- Consolidated Rail Leasing
- RailPower

== Manufacturers ==
- Downer Rail
- UGL Rail
- Alstom
- Voestalpine Railway Systems
- Salix Products Pty Ltd
- Vossloh
- Pacific Rail Engineering
- Progress Rail

== See also ==
- Rail transport in Australia
- List of former Australian railway companies
