= Rail transport in Australia =

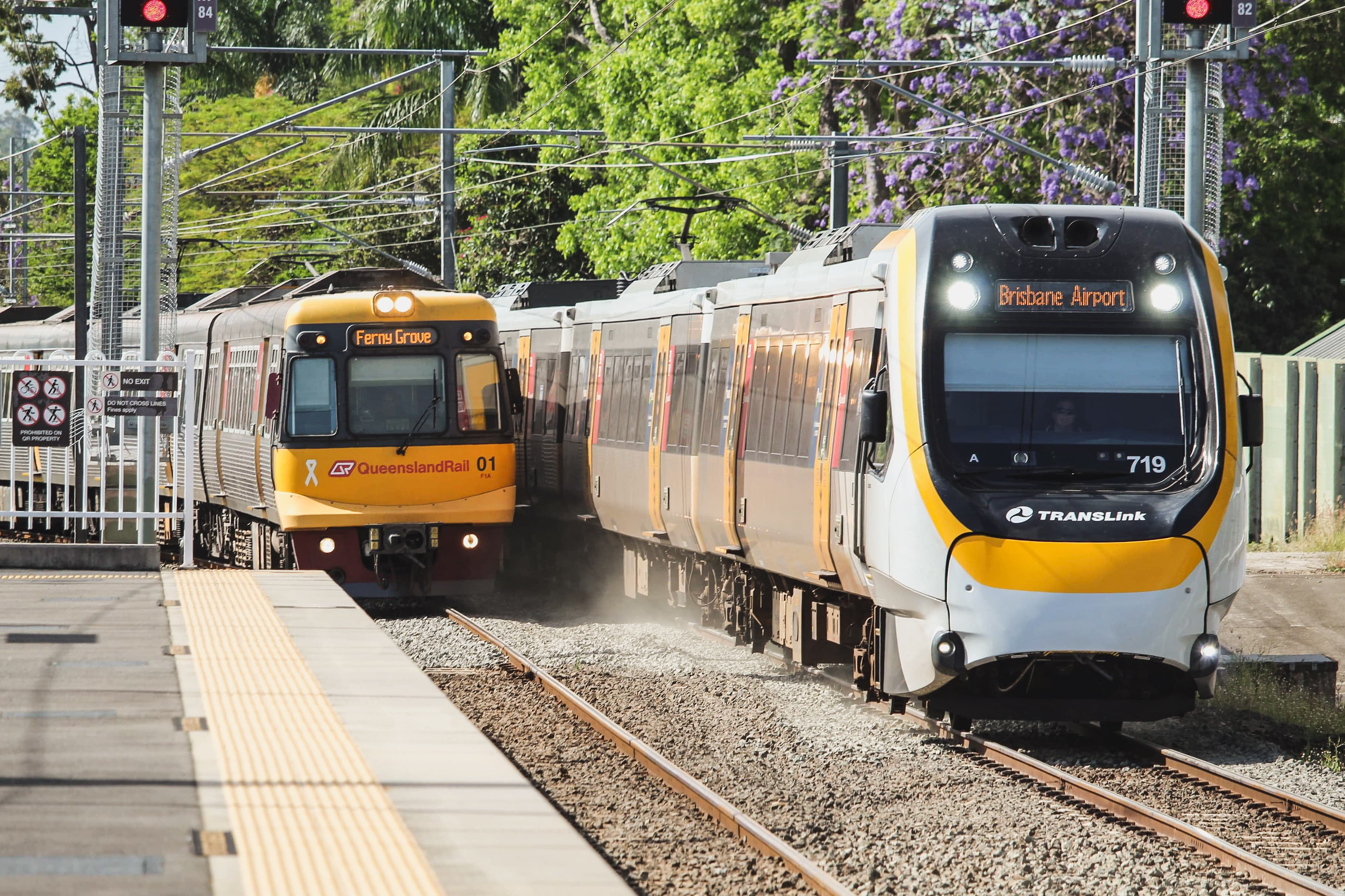
- Passenger trains in Queensland. The small loading gauge of Queensland's narrow-gauge railways prevents the running of rolling stock from other states on unmodified lines.

Operation
- Infrastructure company: Australian Rail Track Corporation, government agencies and private companies
- Major operators: Government and private operators

System length
- Total: 31,212 km (19,394 mi) as of December 2024
- Electrified: 3548 km (2205 mi)

Track gauge
- 1600 mm (5 ft 3 in) broad gauge: 2482 km (1542 mi)
- 1435 mm (4 ft 8 1/2 in) standard gauge: 17,544 km (10,901 mi)
- 1067 mm (3 ft 6 in) narrow gauge: 10,923 km (6787 mi)
- Dual: 264 km (164 mi)

Features
Map
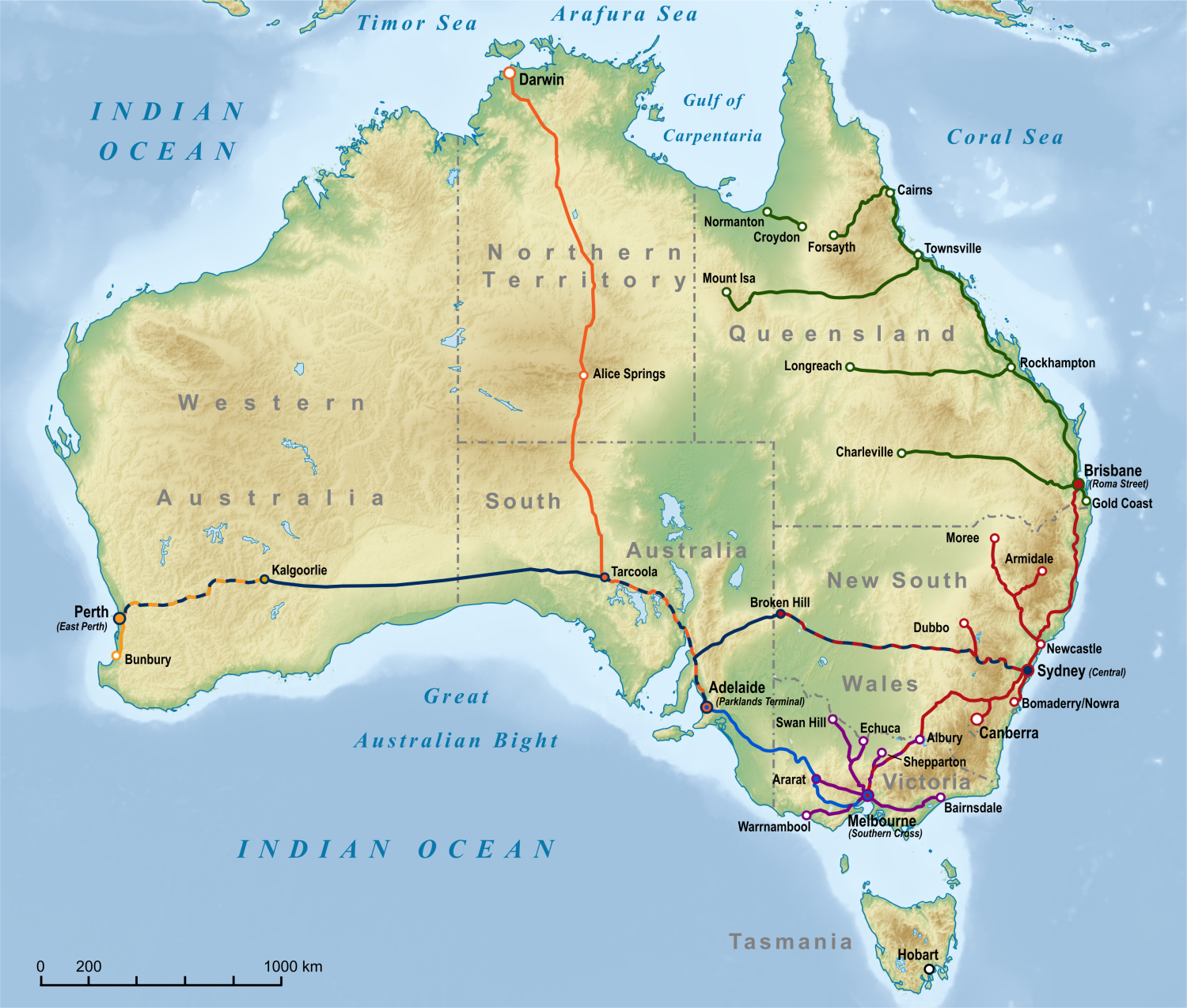
- Passenger train services in Australia (2015). Perth, Adelaide, Melbourne, Sydney and Brisbane have suburban services.

Rail transport in Australia is a component of the Australian transport system. Australian railways, unlike those in North America for example, are not all on the same track gauge. In the mid-19th century, when Australia consisted of six colonies, decisions were made with little concern for the consequences when the respective railways would be joined up. They were built to three track gauges: 1600 mm (5 ft 3 in) broad gauge, 1435 mm (4 ft 8 1/2 in) standard gauge, and 1067 mm (3 ft 6 in) narrow gauge. Despite standardising the rail gauge between the mainland capital cities, completed only in 1982, many of the consequences of the 19th-century folly remain and to a large extent, Australian railways remain state-based.

As delineated in the infobox, total route-kilometres of these gauges as of December 2024 were respectively about 8%, 56% and 35% of the grand total of 31,212 kilometres (19,394 mi). Less than 1% was dual gauge and about 11% was electrified. About 87% of the network is single-tracked. Additionally, about 1400 kilometres (870 mi) of 610 mm (2 ft) narrow-gauge lines support the sugar-cane industry, mainly in the state of Queensland.

Except for a small number of private railways, including the very heavy mineral railways in the north of Western Australia, most "below-rail" infrastructure is government-owned, either at the state or federal level. The federal government is also involved in formation of national policies and provides funding for national projects.

== National issues ==
=== Uniform gauge ===
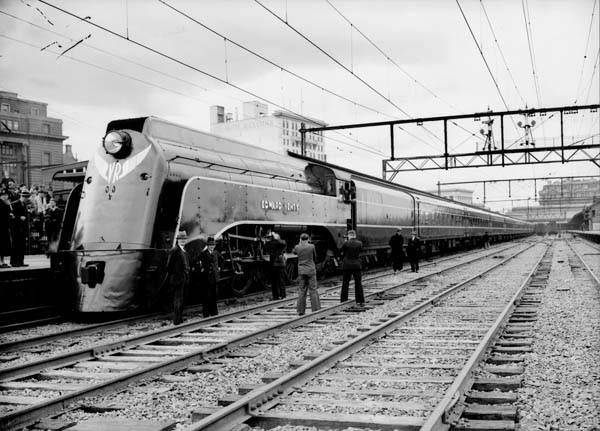
The Spirit of Progress press launch with locomotive S302 at Spencer Street station prior to the demonstration run to Geelong, in 1937

Very little thought was given in the early years of the development of the colony-based rail networks of Australia-wide interests. The most obvious issue to arise was determining a track gauge. Despite advice from London to adopt a uniform gauge, should the lines of the various colonies ever meet, gauges were adopted in different colonies, and indeed within colonies, without reference to those of other colonies. This has caused problems ever since.

Attempts to fix the gauge problem are by no means complete.

=== Electrification ===
With the electrification of suburban networks, which began in 1919, a consistent electric rail traction standard was not adopted. Electrification began in Melbourne in 1919 using 1500 V DC. Sydney's lines were electrified from 1926 using 1500 V DC, Brisbane's from 1979 using 25 kV AC, and Perth's from 1992 using 25 kV AC. There has also been extensive non-urban electrification in Queensland using 25 kV AC, mainly during the 1980s for the coal routes. From 2014 Adelaide's lines are being gradually electrified at 25 kV AC. 25 kV AC voltage has now become the international standard.

== History ==
The first railways in Australia were built by private companies, based in the then colonies of New South Wales, Victoria and South Australia.

The first railway was privately owned and operated and commissioned by the Australian Agricultural Company in Newcastle in 1831, a cast-iron fishbelly rail on an inclined plane as a gravitational railway servicing A Pit coal mine. The first steam-powered line opened in Victoria in 1854. The four km long Flinders Street to Sandridge line was opened by the Melbourne & Hobson's Bay Railway Company at the height of the Victorian gold rush.

In these early years there was very little thought of Australia-wide interests in developing the colony-based networks. The most obvious issue to arise was determining a uniform gauge for the continent. Despite advice from London to adopt a uniform gauge, should the lines of the various colonies ever meet, gauges were adopted in different colonies, and indeed within colonies, without reference to those of other colonies. This example has caused problems ever since at the national level.

In the 1890s, the establishment of an Australian Federation from the six colonies was debated. One of the points of discussion was the extent that railways would be a federal responsibility. A vote to make it so was lost narrowly; instead the new constitution allowed "the acquisition, with the consent of a State, of any railways of the State on terms arranged between the Commonwealth and the State" (Section 51 xxxiii) and "railway construction and extension in any State with the consent of that State" (Section 51 xxxiv). However, the Australian Government is free to provide funding to the states for rail upgrading projects under Section 96 ("the Parliament may grant financial assistance to any State on such terms and conditions as the Parliament thinks fit").

Suburban electrification began in Melbourne in 1919 (1500 V DC). Sydney's lines were electrified from 1926 (1500 V DC), Brisbane's from 1979 (25 kV AC), and Perth's from 1992 (25 kV AC). Mainline electrification was first carried out in Victoria in 1954, closely followed by New South Wales which continued to expand their network. These networks have fallen into decline, in contrast to Queensland where 25 kV AC equipment was introduced from the 1980s for coal traffic.

Diesel locomotives were introduced to Australian railways from the early 1950s. Most units were of local design and construction, using imported British or American technology and power equipment. The three major firms were Clyde Engineering partnered with GM-EMD, Goninan with General Electric, and AE Goodwin (later Comeng) with the American Locomotive Company (Alco). The major British company was English Electric; Swiss firm Sulzer also supplied some equipment. This continues today, with Downer Rail and UGL Rail the modern incarnations of Clyde and Goninan respectively.

=== Milestones ===
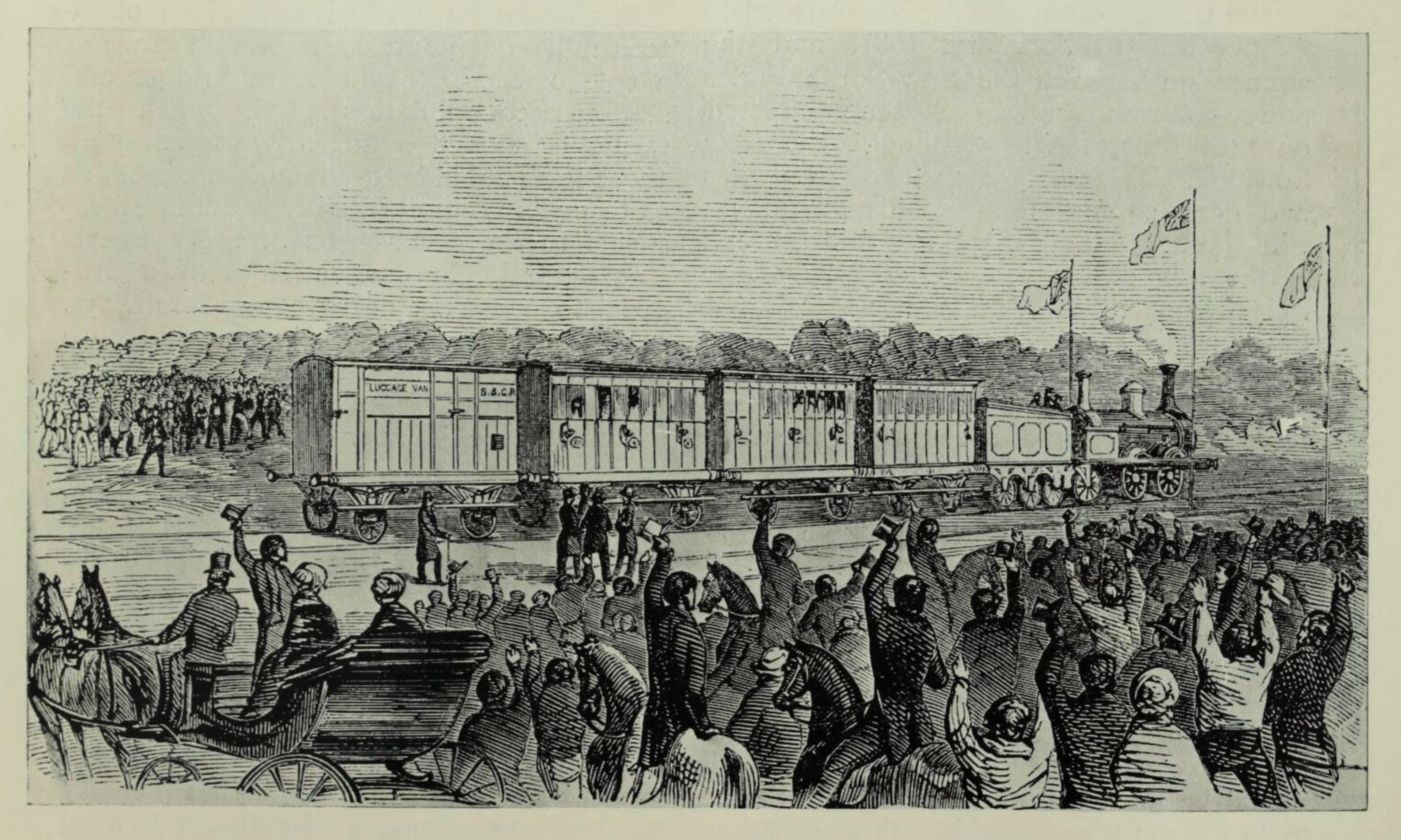
First steam-powered train to operate in New South Wales, 26 September 1855

Note: In the list below, narrow gauge is 1067 mm (3 ft 6 in), standard gauge is 1435 mm (4 ft 8 1/2 in) and broad gauge is 1600 mm (5 ft 3 in).

- 1831 – Newcastle, New South Wales – Australia's first "railed way" (Note: The term "railed way" refers to a configuration that preceded those of full-scale railways. For example, the AA Co funicular had short, brittle, cast-iron fishbelly rails that would have been inadequate for the higher speeds and weights of trains on the railways being developed at the time.) opened. Coal skips descended by gravity down a funicular with a 17° slope for 160 m (170 yd), then were moved for another 220 m (240 yd) along a near-horizontal bridge to an Australian Agricultural Company staithe by horses and, for some time, by convicts. Short cast-iron fishbelly rails were used.
- 1836 – Tasmania, Port Arthur penal settlement to Taranna, about 10 km (6.2 mi) long – Australia's first "railed way" to haul passengers and general freight (Note: The term "railed way" refers to a configuration that preceded those of full-scale railways. Timber rails were totally inadequate for speeds higher than those of running men or weights of more than half a ton.) (not timetabled), pushed by convicts, opened. Rails were timber.
- 1853 – South Australia, Goolwa to Port Elliot railway, 10.9 km (6.8 mi) long – first full-scale railway (Note: A 1991 Institution of Engineers Australia paper on the engineering heritage significance of the Goolwa–Port Elliot railway postulated that [full-scale] railways might be defined as having six characteristics: specialised track; acceptance of public traffic; carriage of passengers; a measure of public control; mechanical traction; scope for development and expansion of the system.; By this definition, the lack of mechanical traction disqualifies the Goolwa–Port Elliot railway from a claim to be Australia's first full-scale railway ahead of the steam-powered Melbourne to Sandridge railway.) in Australia for public conveyance of passengers (timetabled) and general freight opened. Infrastructure was that of a main-line railway but instead of using mechanical traction, trains were horse-drawn as an economy measure. It was the first government-owned railway in the British Empire.
- 1854 – Victoria, Melbourne to Sandridge (now Port Melbourne) railway, 4.2 km (2.6 mi) long – first full-scale public railway (in the modern sense, using steam locomotion) opened.
- 1855 – New South Wales – standard gauge steam powered railway from Sydney to Parramatta 21 km (13 mi) opened.
- 1856 – South Australia, Adelaide to Port Adelaide broad-gauge railway 12 km (7.5 mi) opened.
- 1865 – Queensland – narrow gauge Ipswich to Bigges Camp (renamed Grandchester in honour of occasion) on the way to Toowoomba railway opened, first narrow gauge main line in the world.
- 1871 – Tasmania – Deloraine to Launceston railway opened as broad gauge, converted to narrow gauge in 1888
- 1879 – Western Australia – narrow gauge Geraldton to Northampton railway opened
- 1883 – Railways of New South Wales and Victoria meet at Albury
- 1887 – Railways of Victoria and South Australia meet at Serviceton
- 1888 – Railways of New South Wales and Queensland meet at Wallangara
- 1889 – Western Australia's first land grant railway opened, the narrow gauge Great Southern Railway, completed from Beverley to Albany, linking Perth to the colony's only deep-water port
- 1889 – Northern Territory – narrow gauge Darwin to Pine Creek railway opened
- 1891 – Western Australia – first sections of narrow gauge privately funded land grant Midland Railway opened, completed from Midland Junction to Walkaway in 1894.
- 1915 – Standard gauge Canberra to Queanbeyan railway opened
- 1917 – Standard gauge Trans-Australian Railway completed between Kalgoorlie and Port Augusta
- 1919 – Railways of New South Wales and South Australia meet at Broken Hill with break-of-gauge
- 1919 – First electric suburban trains run in Melbourne
- 1924 – Final section of North Coast line opens, linking Cairns to the rest of the Australian railway system
- 1925 – Great White Train is created to promote industry and tours in New South Wales.
- 1930 – Standard gauge Sydney–Brisbane railway completed with trains crossing the Clarence River on a train ferry until the opening of a bridge at Grafton in 1932.
- 1937 – Trans-Australian Railway extended to Port Pirie Junction and the broad gauge railway from Adelaide to Redhill extended to Port Pirie Ellen Street
- 1954 – first main line electrification, from Dandenong to Traralgon in Victoria
- 1962 – Albury to Melbourne standard gauge railway opened, completing the Sydney–Melbourne railway
- 1966 – Western Australia's first private standard gauge railway opened – the Goldsworthy railway line transported iron ore 112 km from Mount Goldsworthy mine to Port Hedland
- 1968 – Kalgoorlie to Perth standard gauge railway opened
- 1969 – Broken Hill to Port Pirie standard gauge railway opened, completing the Sydney–Perth railway
- 1980 – Tarcoola to Alice Springs standard gauge railway opened
- 1982 – Adelaide to Crystal Brook standard gauge railway opened
- 1989 – Electrification of the final section of the Brisbane-Rockhampton line, completing a ~2,100 km electrified network
- 1995 – Melbourne–Adelaide railway standard gauge railway completed
- 2004 – Adelaide–Darwin railway standard gauge railway completed.

== Government funding ==
Total private and public sector railway engineering construction value (thousands of Australian dollars, monthly).

While Australian federal governments have provided substantial funding for the upgrading of roads, since the 1920s they have not regularly funded investment in railways except for their own railway, the Commonwealth Railways, later Australian National Railways, which was privatised in 1997. They have considered the funding of railways owned by State Governments to be a State responsibility.

Nevertheless, Australian governments have made loans to the states for gauge standardisation projects from the 1920s to the 1970s. From the 1970s to 1996, the Australian Government has provided some grant funding to the States for rail projects, particularly the Keating Government's One Nation program, announced in 1992, which was notable for standardising the Adelaide to Melbourne line in 1995. Significant government funding was also made available for the Alice Springs to Darwin line, opened in 2004. Substantial funding is now being made available for freight railways through the Australian Rail Track Corporation and the AusLink land transport funding program.

=== Australian Rail Track Corporation ===
The Australian Rail Track Corporation (ARTC) is a federal government owned corporation established in 1997 that owns, leases, maintains and controls the majority of main line standard gauge railway lines on the mainland of Australia, known as the Designated Interstate Rail Network (DIRN).

In 2003 the Australian and New South Wales Governments agreed that ARTC would lease the NSW interstate and Hunter Valley networks for 60 years. As part of this agreement, ARTC agreed to a $872 million investment programme on the interstate rail network. The funding sources for the investment included an Australian Government equity injection into ARTC of $143 million and a funding contribution of almost $62 million by the New South Wales Government.

=== AusLink ===
Under the AusLink program introduced in July 2004, the Australian Government has introduced the opportunity for rail to gain access to funds on a similar basis to that of roads. AusLink established a defined national network (superseding the former National Highway system) of important road and rail infrastructure links and their intermodal connections.

Rail funding has been announced for signalling upgrades to numerous railway lines, gauge conversion of existing broad gauge lines in Victoria to standard gauge, new rail links to intermodal freight precincts, and extensions to existing crossing loops to permit longer trains to operate.

Funding is focused on the National Network, including the following rail corridors, connecting at one or both ends to State Capital Cities:

- Sydney–Melbourne railway
- Sydney–Brisbane railway
- Sydney to Adelaide, via Sydney–Melbourne railway to Cootamundra and then the Cootamundra–Parkes line, Parkes–Crystal Brook line and the Adelaide–Darwin railway
- Melbourne-Adelaide railway
- Adelaide to Perth – Sydney–Perth railway
- Adelaide–Darwin railway
- Brisbane to Townsville – the North Coast railway line in Queensland
- Townsville to Mount Isa
- Hobart to Burnie, including link to Bell Bay, Tasmania
- Melbourne to Mildura via Geelong
- Sydney to Dubbo
- Some urban links in Sydney, Melbourne, Brisbane, Perth and Adelaide, connecting the long distance links to each other and to ports and airports
- Hunter Region rail links from Dubbo to Newcastle via the Dubbo-Merrygoen, Merrygoen–Binnaway, Binnaway–Werris Creek and Werris Creek–Port of Newcastle lines and the Merrygoen–Gulgong, Merrygoen–Sandy Hollow and Sandy Hollow–Muswellbrook lines

=== Infrastructure Australia ===
After the 2007 federal election, the government body Infrastructure Australia was created to oversee all rail, road, airports and other infrastructure at a national level.

== Rail infrastructure ==
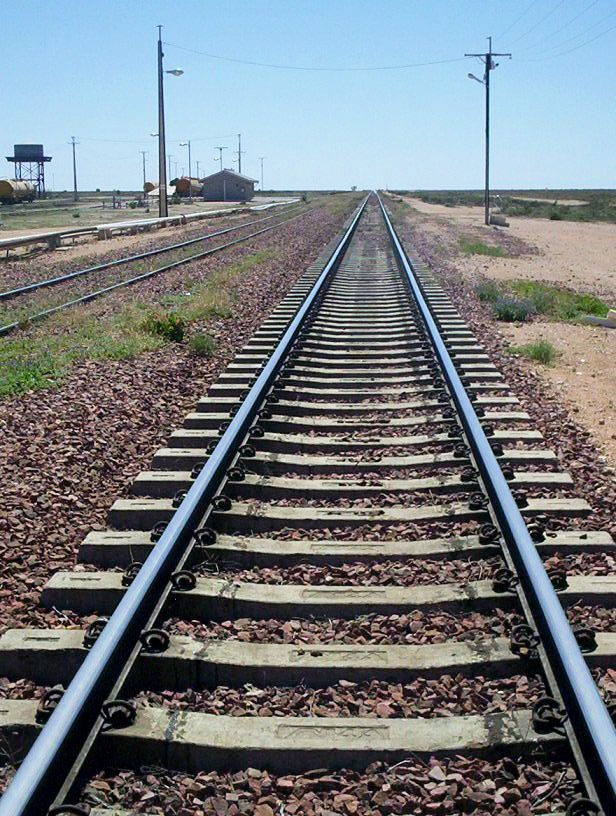
Looking along the Trans-Australian Railway

Construction and maintenance of network infrastructure is consolidated into non-profit government bodies and contracted private companies: in the case of the interstate network and various non-urban railways of New South Wales, Victoria and Western Australia, the Australian Government-owned Australian Rail Track Corporation (ARTC); the New South Wales Regional Network, John Holland Rail; and rail infrastructure throughout the southern half of Western Australia, Arc Infrastructure. As of 2024, there were an estimated 18 mainline heavy rail infrastructure managers.

ARTC "has a working relationship with Queensland Rail about the use of the 127 kilometres (79 mi) of standard gauge line between the Queensland border and Fisherman Island. ARTC intends to start discussions with Queensland about leasing this track once the NSW arrangements are bedded down". ARTC also maintains the NSW Hunter Valley network under contract.

On 1 January 2012, John Holland commenced the operation and maintenance of the New South Wales Regional Network under contract from Transport for NSW, comprising 2,700 kilometres (1,700 mi) of operational freight and passenger rail lines.

Arc Infrastructure has a lease until 2049 on 5,100 kilometres (3,200 mi) of Western Australian rail infrastructure, from Geraldton in the north, to Leonora and Kalgoorlie in the east, and south to Esperance, Albany and Bunbury. It is responsible for maintaining the network and granting access to operators.

Other railways continue to be integrated, although access to their infrastructure is generally required under National Competition Policy principles agreed by the Federal, State and Territory governments:

- Queensland – Queensland Rail and Aurizon
- Tasmania – TasRail
- Victorian non-interstate lines – V/Line and Metro Trains Melbourne
- South Australian non-interstate lines – Aurizon
- Tarcoola-Darwin line - Aurizon

Inland Rail is a railway construction project extending from Melbourne to Brisbane along a route west of the Great Dividing Range. Construction in stages commenced in 2018 and is scheduled to be completed in 2025, using existing routes where appropriate.

== National rail freight movement ==
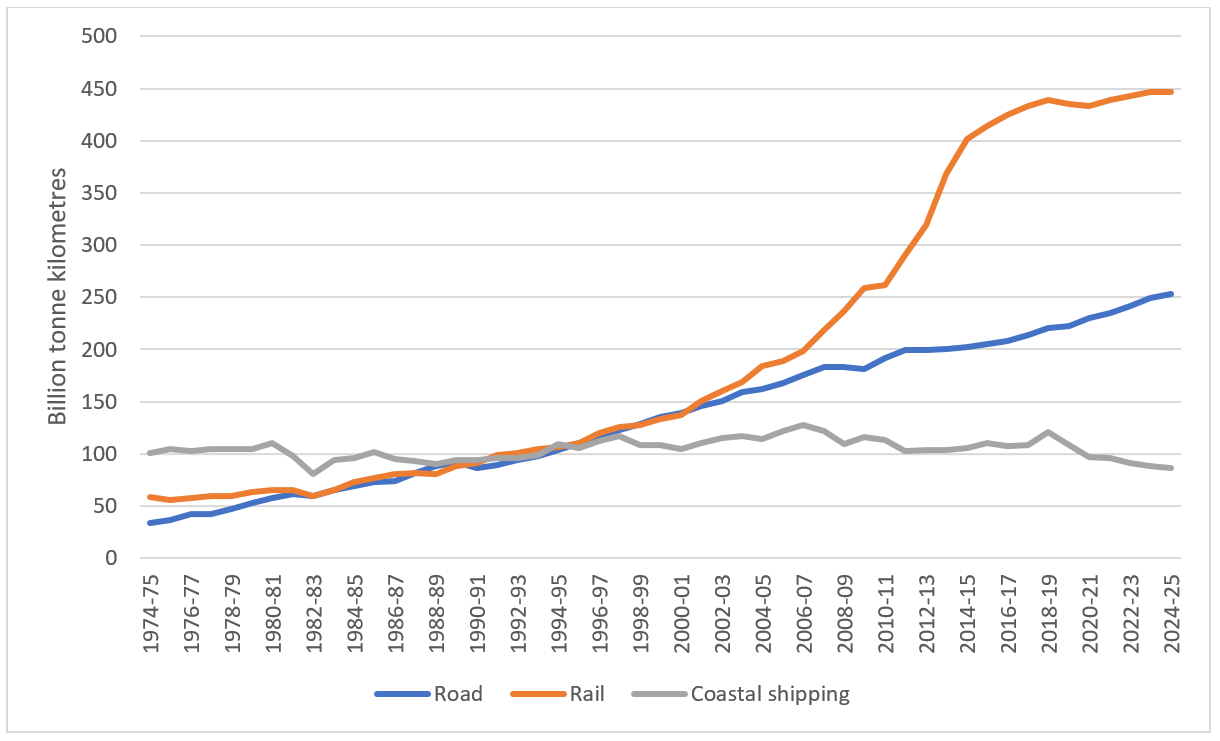
Estimated freight transport volumes by mode (billion tonne-kilometres)

The percentage of freight carried by rail has increased sharply this century. Rail accounts for more than a half of Australian freight transport activity (about 57% in 2023–24, up from approximately 38% in 2003–04). (Note: Note in BITRE Trainline 12 (2025): No current combined data source covers freight transport in the entire Australian network. Individual data sources report part or aspects of the freight task only, such as by commodity or location. These sources include train operator and track/infrastructure manager data and some of this is not otherwise public information.) The dominance of rail freight transport mainly derives from transportation, primarily to ports for export, of iron ore, coal and other bulk products such as grain.

Since 2015, the Bureau of Infrastructure and Transport Research Economics (BITRE), a subsidiary of the Australian Department of Infrastructure, Transport, Regional Development, Communications, Sport and the Arts, has been unable to report aggregated national tonnages because freight train ("above-rail") operators have not released data, although the bureau has obtained some information from sources such as the Australian Securities Exchange and port authorities. In 2023, the Australasian Railway Association and the Freight on Rail Group stated that railways had 68% market share of bulk freight transport in Australia but only 17% market share of non-bulk freight, and that policy changes were necessary to make it easier for rail freight operators to move across networks and jurisdictions and play a greater role in meeting future demand, since road alone could not fulfil it.

== Operators ==
=== Rail freight ===
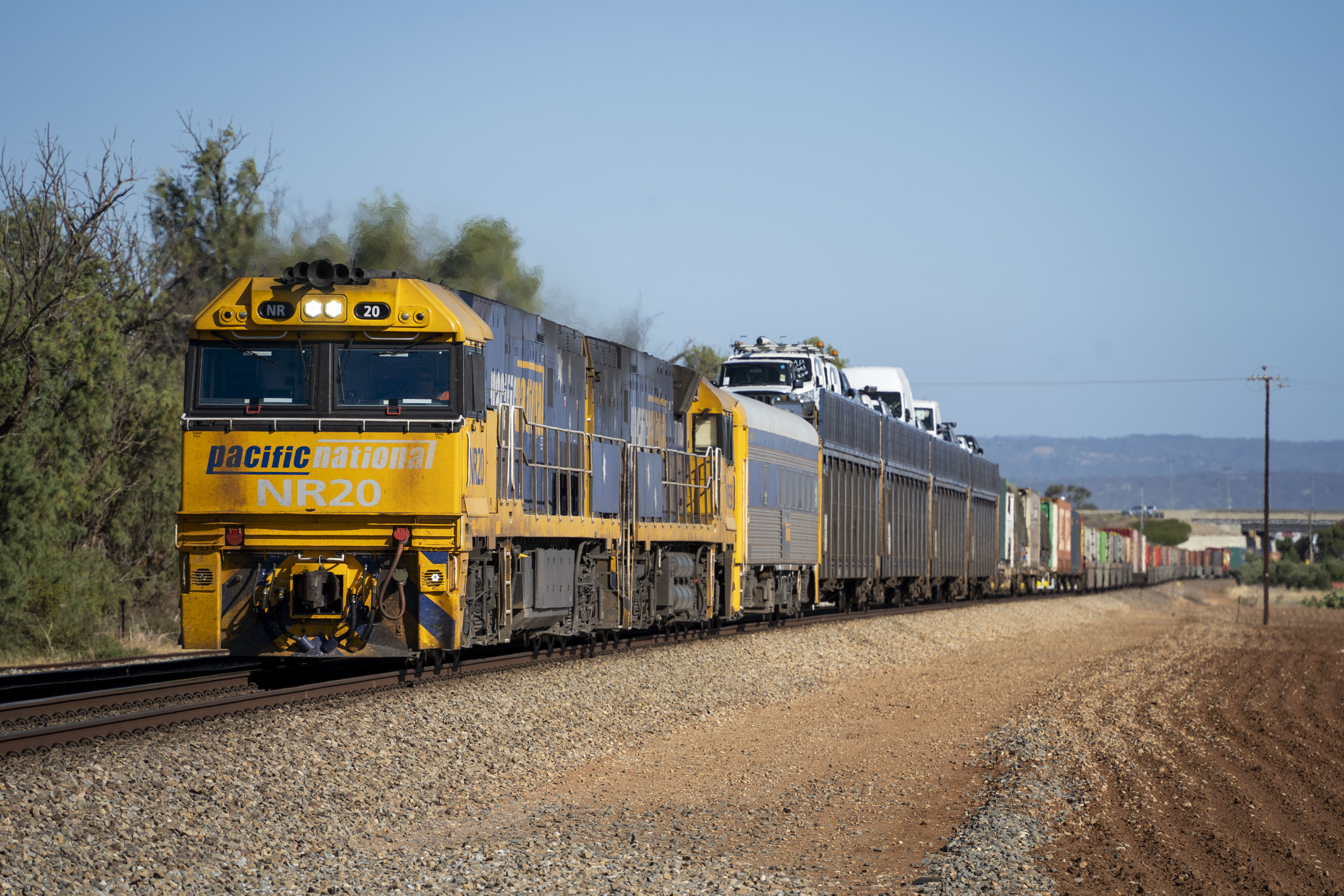
Pacific National intermodal service heading to Perth from Adelaide passing through Virginia, South Australia in December, 2024

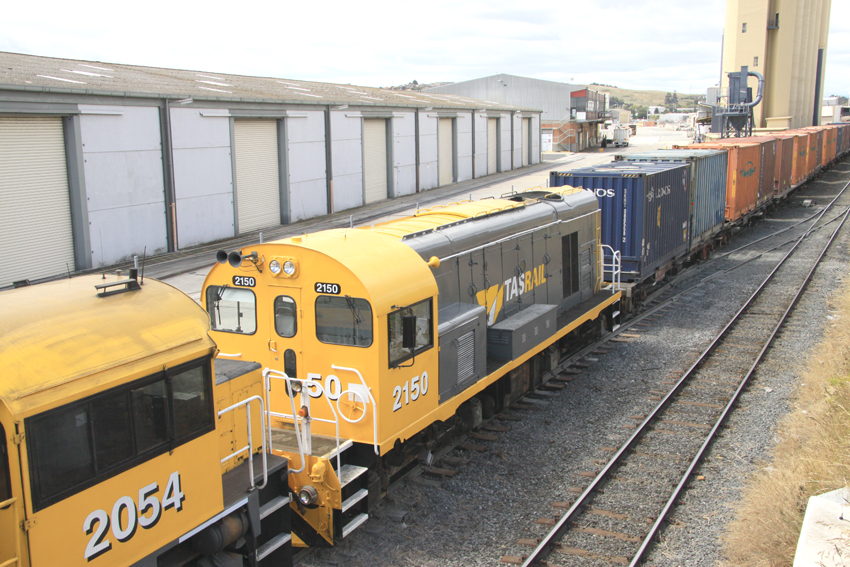
A TasRail container train with Driving Van DV2150 in Devonport, Tasmania

The major freight operators on the rail networks (excluding integrated mining railways) are:

- Aurizon
- Pacific National
- Qube Logistics
- SCT Logistics

Other rail freight operators include:

- Bowmans Rail
- East Coast Rail
- Southern Shorthaul Railroad
- TasRail

Licensing of personnel with nationally recognised credentials facilitates the transfer of those employees from one state or operator to another, as traffic demands.

=== Long-distance passenger ===
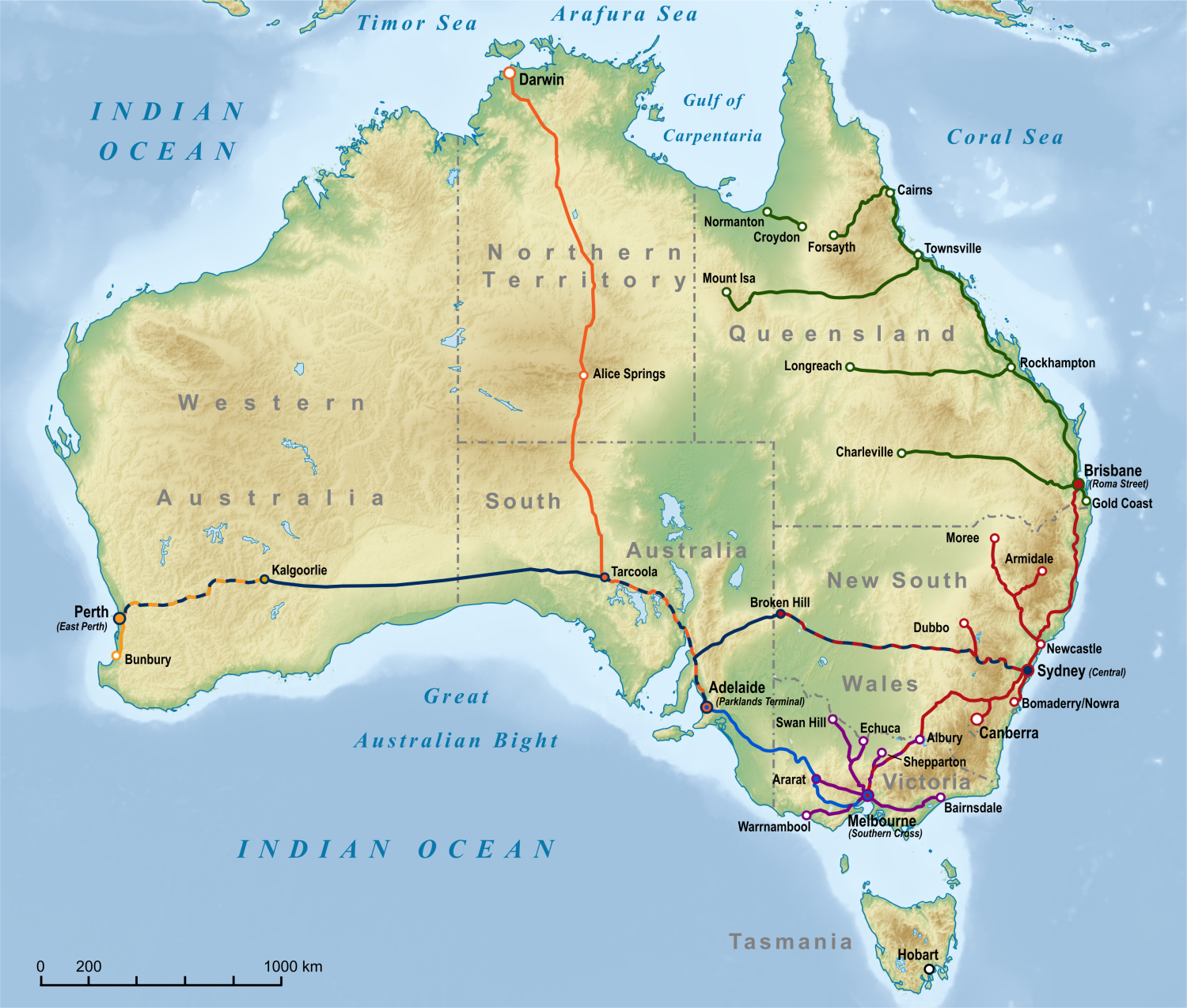
Map of passenger railway services in Australia State Government owned rail services: Queensland Rail City network and Traveltrain services NSW TrainLink services V/Line services Transwa services Journey Beyond services: Indian Pacific The Overland The Ghan

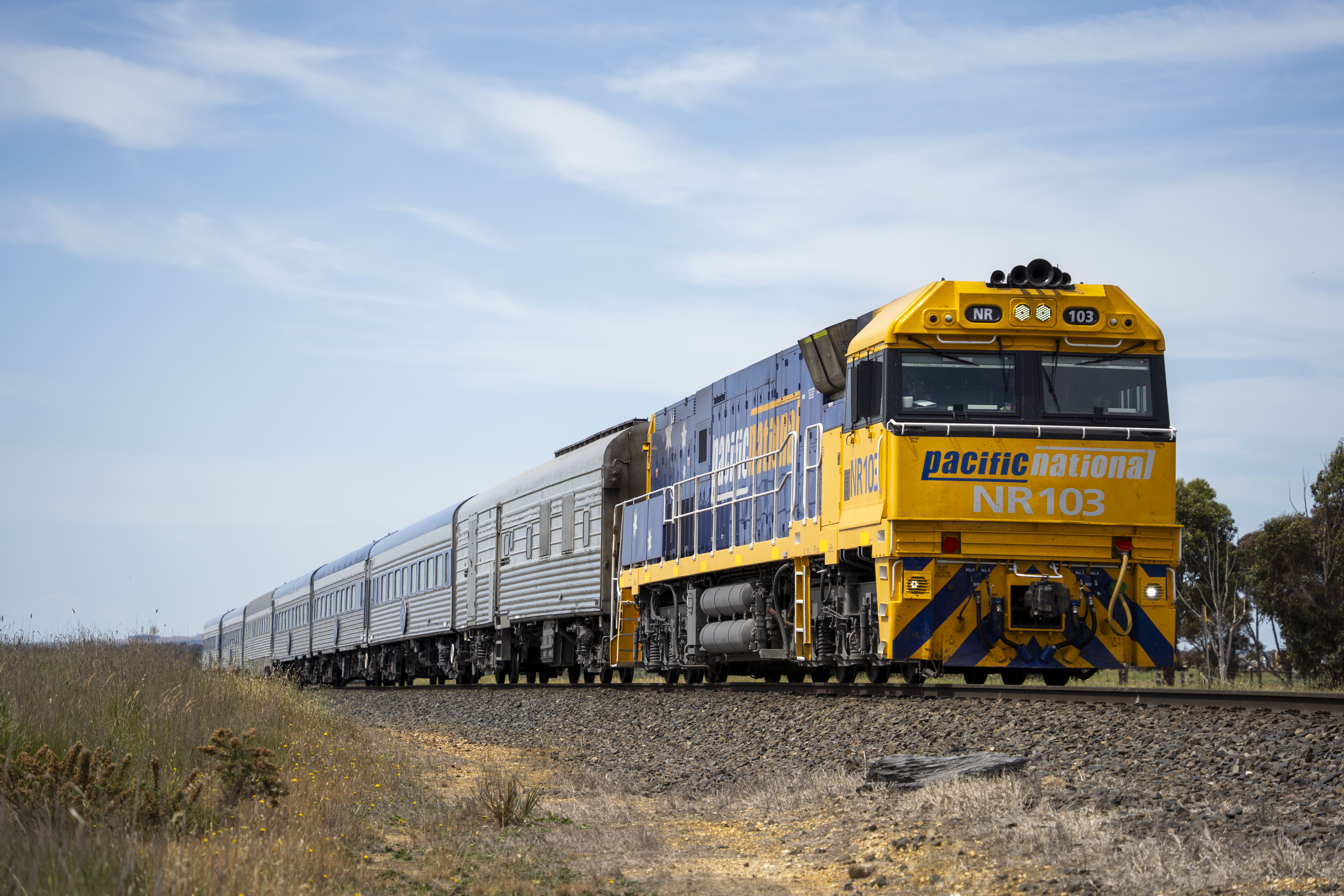
The Overland passenger train approaching Ararat, Victoria in November 2023

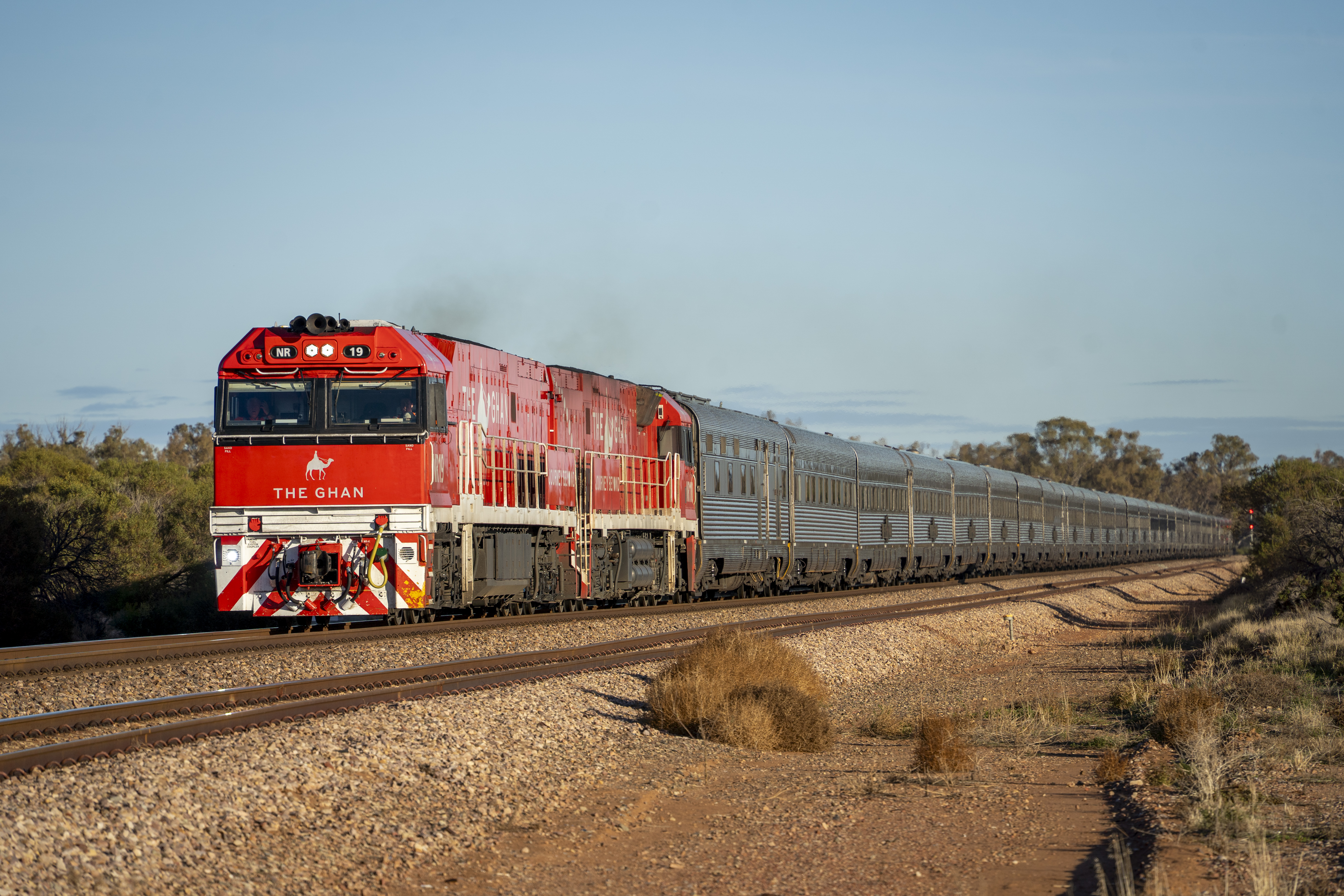
The Ghan passenger train passing through Nectar Brook, South Australia in July 2025

Unlike the United States, Canada, and the United Kingdom, Long-distance rail and regional rail in Australia mostly operates on a state-by-state basis. The main companies that provide service are Journey Beyond, NSW TrainLink, Queensland Rail and V/Line.

Journey Beyond operates four long-distance trains, the first three of the following being upmarket "experiential" services:

- Indian Pacific (Sydney–Adelaide–Perth): 1 round trip per week
- The Ghan (Adelaide–Alice Springs–Darwin): 1 round trip per week except during summer
- Great Southern (Adelaide–Brisbane): 1 round trip per week during summer
- The Overland (Melbourne–Adelaide): 2 round trips per week

New South Wales government-controlled NSW TrainLink operates ten long-distance passenger routes. All routes originate from Sydney:

- Grafton XPT: daily (Replaced with road coaches until April 2026)
- Casino XPT: daily
- Brisbane XPT: daily
- Canberra Xplorer: 3 round trips per day
- Melbourne XPT: 2 round trips per day
- Griffith Xplorer: 2 round trip per week
  - Griffith Xplorer is attached onto Canberra Xplorer between Central & Goulburn
- Central West XPT (to Dubbo): daily
- Outback Xplorer (to Broken Hill): 1 round trip per week
- Armidale Xplorer: daily
- Moree Xplorer: daily
  - Armidale & Moree Xplorer run as 1 train between Central & Werris Creek

V/Line, a Victorian government-owned not-for-profit statutory corporation, operates both regional and long-distance services along the Victorian regional network. V/Line operates eight long-distance services from Melbourne:

- Warrnambool line: 5 round trips per day
- Ararat line: 5 round trips per day
- Maryborough line: 2 round trips per day
- Swan Hill line: 2 round trips per day
- Echuca line: 3 round trips per weekday, 2 round trips per Sat/Sun
- Shepparton line: 5 round trips per weekday, 3 round trips per Sat/Sun
- Albury line: 3 round trips per day
- Bairnsdale line: 3 round trips per day

Queensland Rail, a state entity, operates several passenger lines under its train subsidiary. Five routes target the domestic market:

- Spirit of Queensland (Brisbane–Cairns): 3 round trips per week
- Electric Tilt Train (Brisbane–Rockhampton): 12 round trips per week
- Spirit of the Outback (Brisbane–Longreach): 2 round trips per week
- The Westlander (Brisbane–Charleville): 2 round trips per week
- The Inlander (Townsville–Mount Isa): 2 round trips per week

An additional three Queensland Rail routes are aimed at providing tourist services:

- The Savannahlander (Cairns–Forsayth): 1 round trip per week (operated under private contract)
- The Gulflander (Normanton–Croydon): 1 round trip per week
- Kuranda Scenic Railway (Cairns–Kuranda): daily

The Public Transport Authority, a government agency of Western Australia, operates various buses and four long-distance rail routes through its Transwa subsidiary. All routes originate from Perth:

- Prospector: (Perth-Kalgoorlie) 9 round trips per week
- AvonLink: (Perth (Midland)–Northam) 1 round trip per day
- MerredinLink: (Perth–Merredin) 3 round trips per week

Australind Set 04 Arriving into Perth

- The Australind: (Perth–Bunbury) 2 round trips per day

=== Urban rail ===
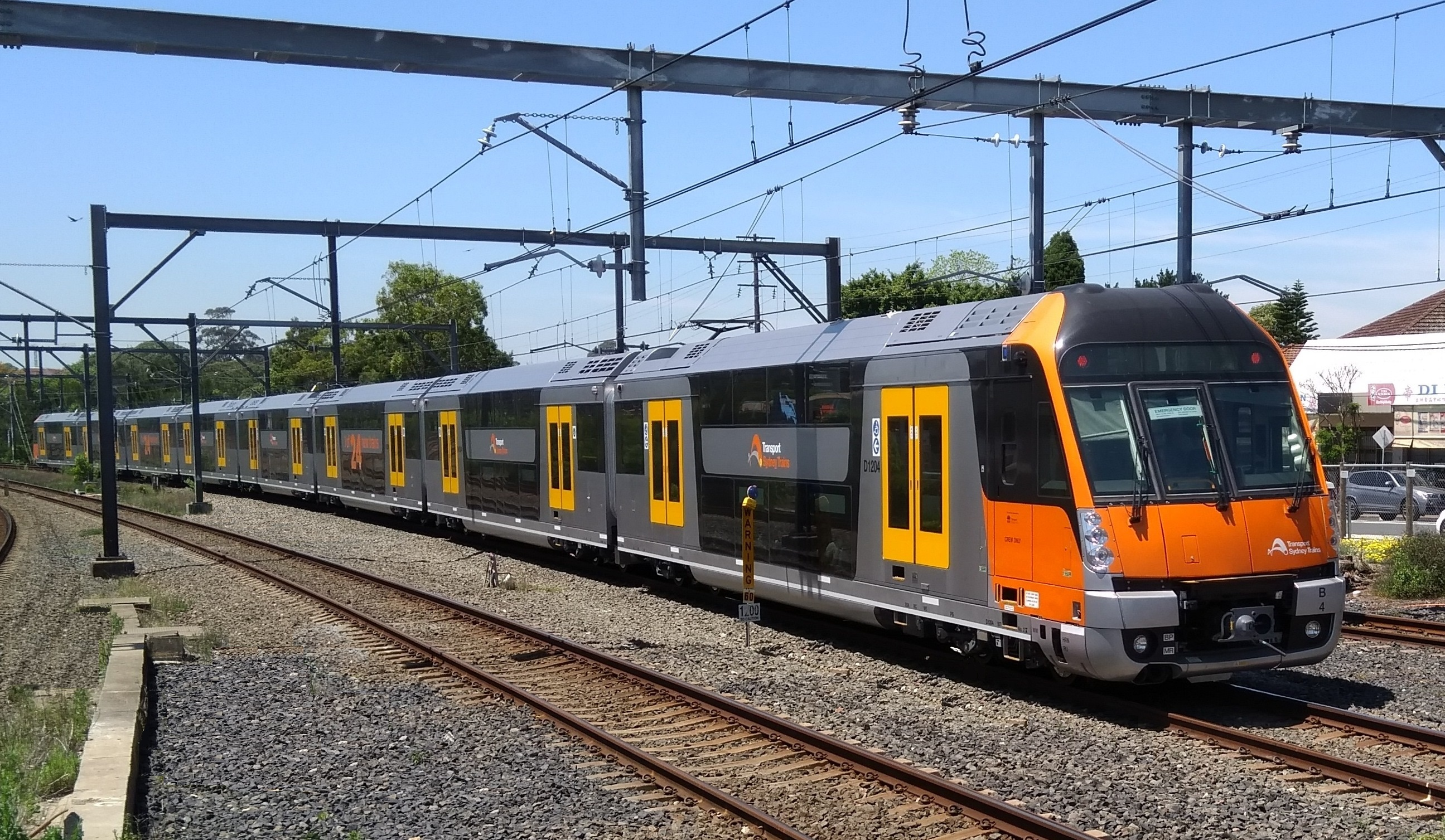
A Sydney Trains B set departing Flemington station

- Sydney Trains is the state government operator of the Sydney suburban railway network and the Sydney intercity network which is part of the Transport for NSW network.
- Metro Trains Sydney, a private entity whose majority owner is MTR Corporation, operates the Sydney Metro rapid transit line on behalf of Transport for NSW.
- NSW TrainLink, the regional rail operator of NSW, provides services between interstate locations, regional centres and Sydney using the diesel XPT & Xplorer trains.
- Metro Trains Melbourne, a private entity whose majority owner is MTR Corporation, operates the Melbourne suburban railway network on behalf of Public Transport Victoria.
- V/Line, a state government organisation, operates the Victorian regional rail network, including some services within metropolitan Melbourne, and between Melbourne and regional centres on behalf of Public Transport Victoria.
- Queensland Rail through their City network division (formerly Citytrain) is the state government operator of the South East Queensland railway network, which is part of the Translink network.
- Transperth is the public transport system in Perth. Railways in Perth are operated by the Public Transport Authority
- Keolis Downer operates the Adelaide suburban railway network on behalf of Adelaide Metro. This system features six lines.

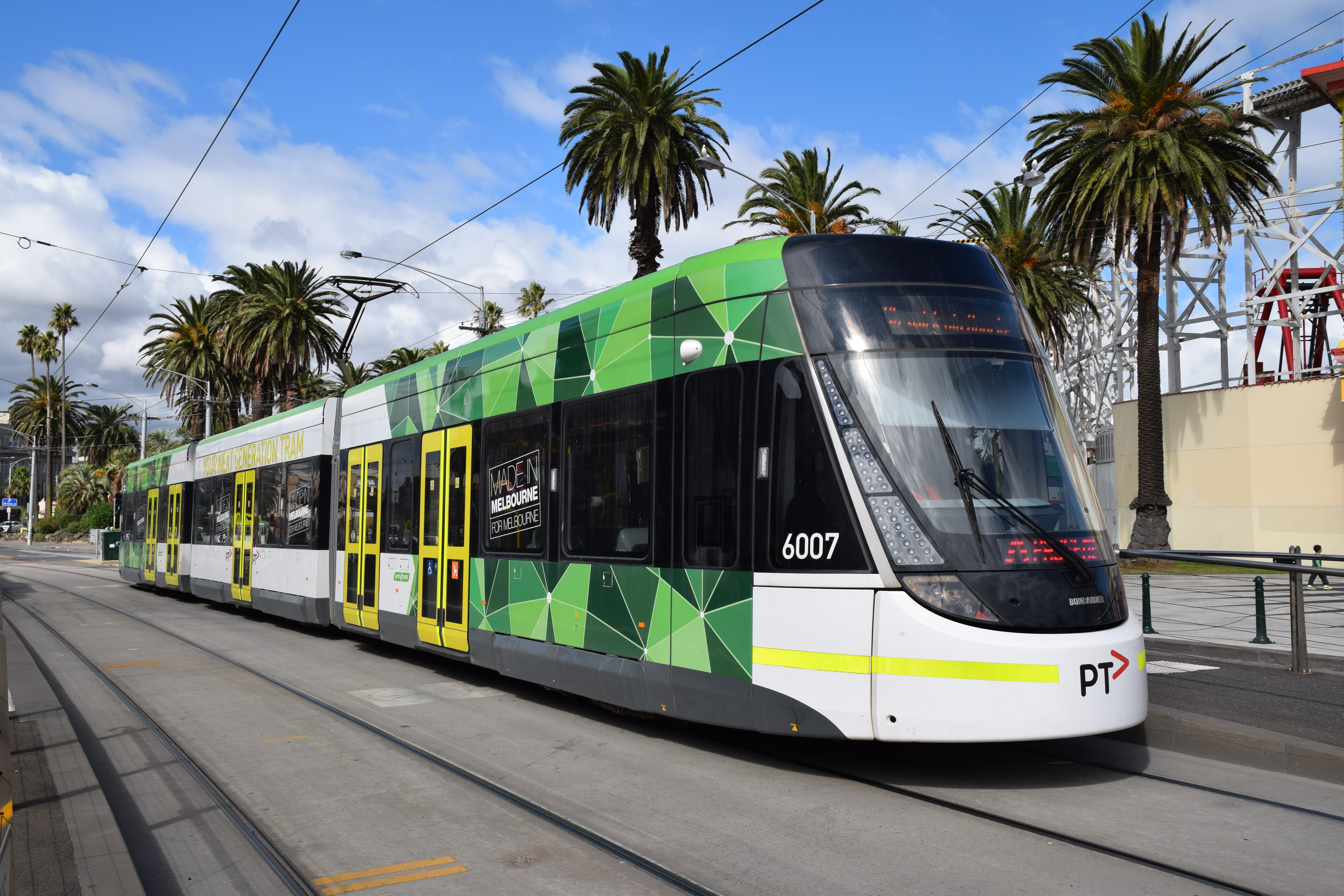
E-class Melbourne trams operated by Yarra Trams.

==== Urban light rail and trams ====
- Yarra Trams, which is a subsidiary of Keolis Downer, operates the 250 km (160 mi), 29 lines of the Melbourne tram network.
- Transdev operates the 24.7 km (15.3 mi) Sydney light rail network, on behalf of Transport for NSW.
- Keolis Downer operates G:link, a 20 km (12 mi) light rail line on the Gold Coast. The line is part of the Translink network.
- Adelaide Metro operates trams in Adelaide.
- Canberra Metro Operations, a private joint venture between John Holland and Pacific Partnerships, operates the 12 km (7.5 mi) Canberra Metro light rail line. This line is part of the Transport Canberra network.
- Keolis Downer, locally branded as Newcastle Transport, operated on behalf of Transport for NSW, operates the 2.7 km (1.7 mi) Newcastle Light Rail line.

=== Tourist and heritage railways ===
There are many heritage railways and heritage tramways in Australia, often run by community organisations and preservation societies. There are also some privately operated passenger services, such as:

- Skitube is a private railway in the New South Wales snowfields. Owned by the Perisher Ski Resort, it connects the main entrance of this tourist destination with ski areas that are inaccessible via road. The line mainly operates underground.
- The Byron Bay Train service operates as a shuttle between Byron Bay station in the Byron Bay township and North Beach station. The privately run service operates on a 3 km section of the disused Murwillimbah line.

== Private railways ==
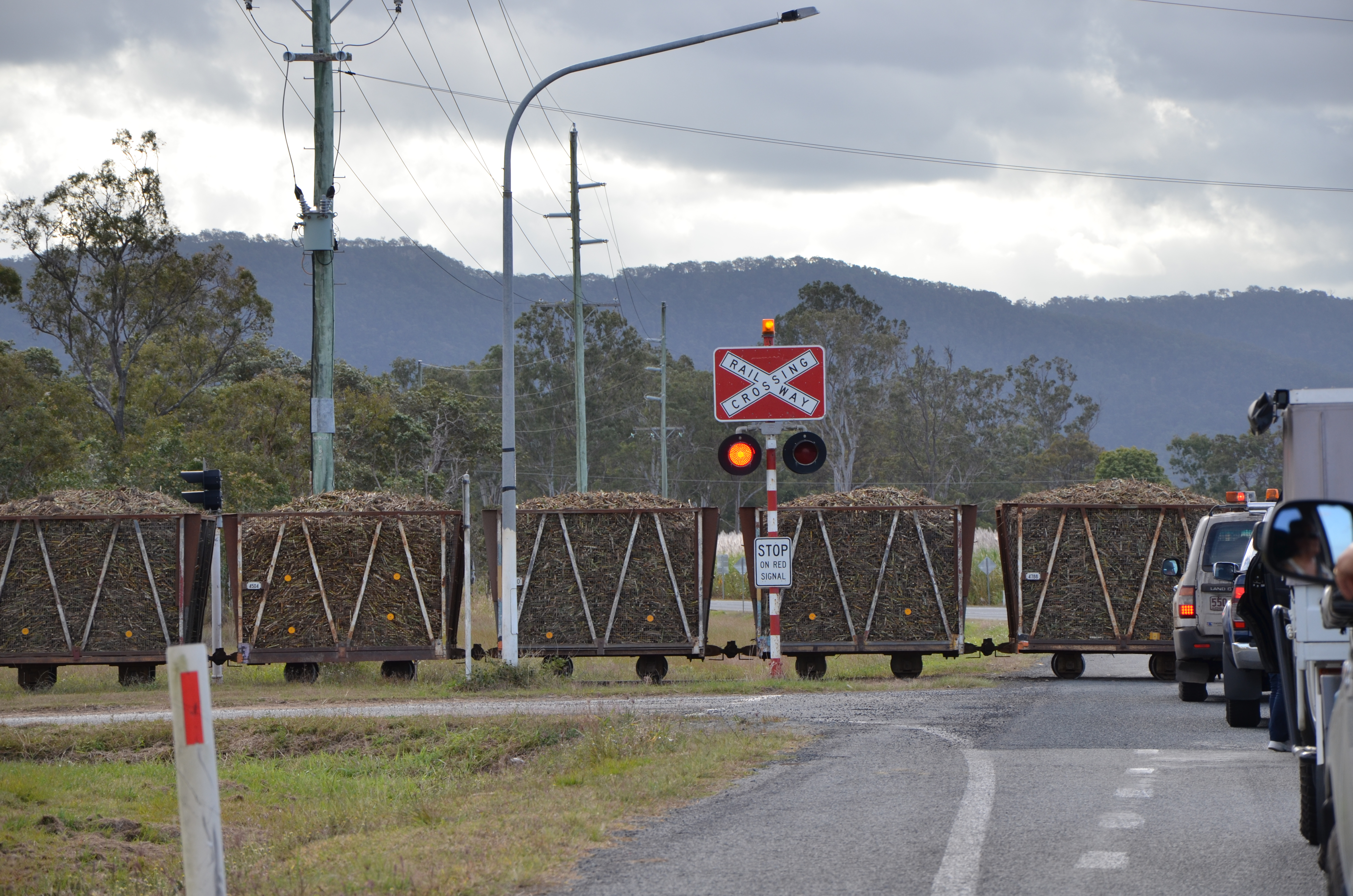
Cane train near Mackay

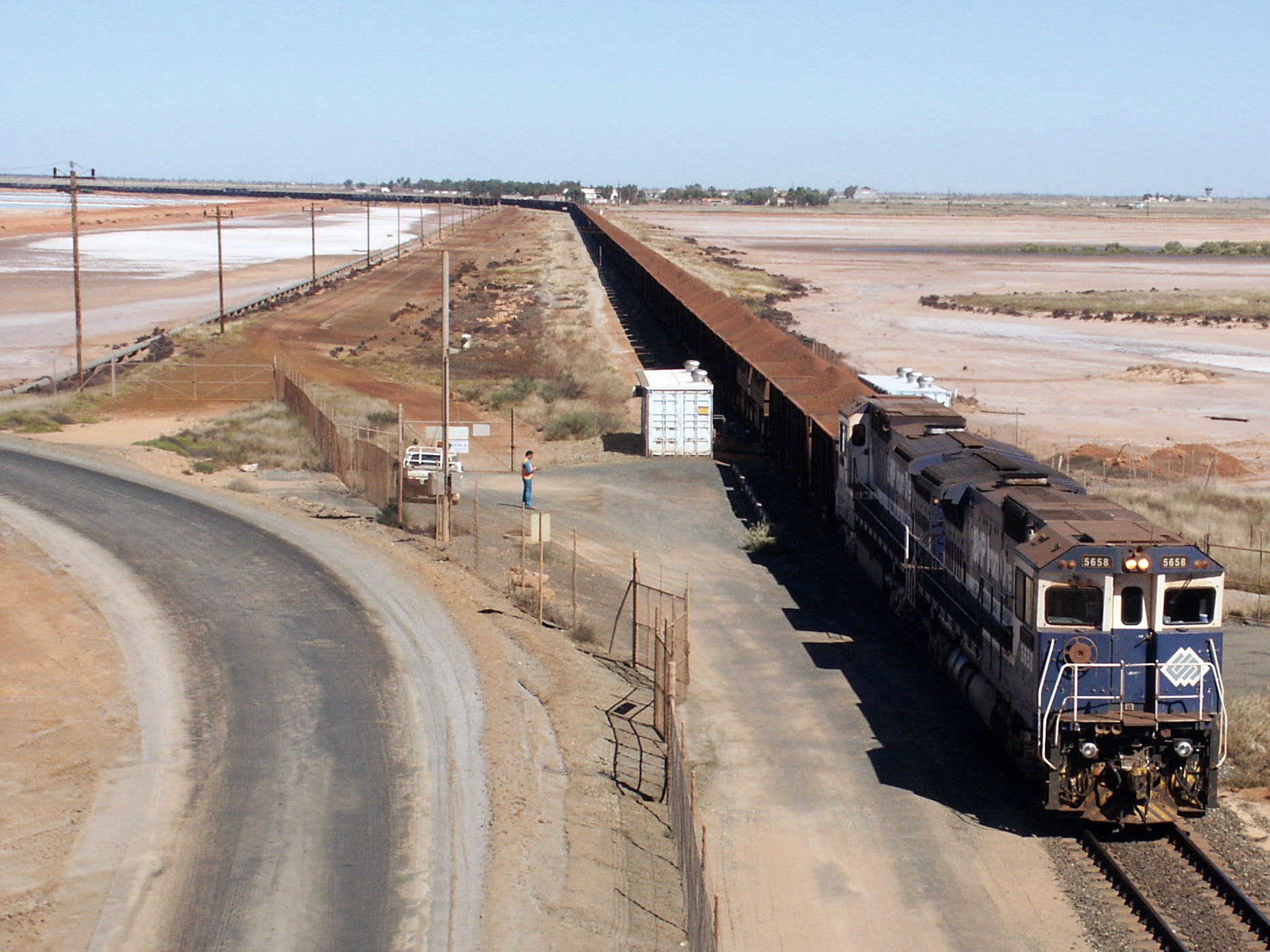
BHP iron ore train arriving into Port Hedland, Western Australia

=== Cane ===
Tramways with 610 mm (2 ft) gauge for the transport of sugarcane have always been operated as private concerns associated with the relevant sugar cane mill. These tramways are quite advanced technically, with hand-me-down rails cascaded from the normal rails, remote-controlled brake vans, concrete sleepers in places, and tamping machines in miniature. The twenty or so separate tramways cooperate in research and development.

=== Timber ===
Tramways were often associated with the transport of timber to sawmills. Various gauges were used, including the 610 mm (2 ft) gauge, which was also commonly used for cane haulage.

Wider gauges were sometimes used as well; Queensland had a number of 991 mm (3 ft 3 in) systems, some on wooden rails. In some areas 1,067 mm (3 ft 6 in) was used, a considerable investment of resources. In the early 21st century, the disused Queensland Rail line to Esk 1,067 mm (3 ft 6 in) in the Brisbane Valley was used for timber haulage.

=== Iron ore ===
Five isolated heavy duty railways for the cartage of iron ore in the Pilbara region of Western Australia have always been private concerns operated as part of the production line between mine and port, initially commencing in 1966 with Goldsworthy Mining Associates' Goldsworthy railway line, and recently in 2008 with Fortescue's Fortescue railway line and in 2015 with Roy Hill Holdings' Roy Hill railway line. These lines are continually optimising axle loads (currently the heaviest in the world) and train lengths, that have pushed the limit of the wheel to rail interface and led to much useful research of value to railways worldwide. An open access sixth standard gauge iron ore network was proposed to the Oakajee Port in the Mid-West region to the south of the Pilbara but the project is currently on hold pending a viable business case.

== High-speed rail ==
=== Medium-speed passenger services ===
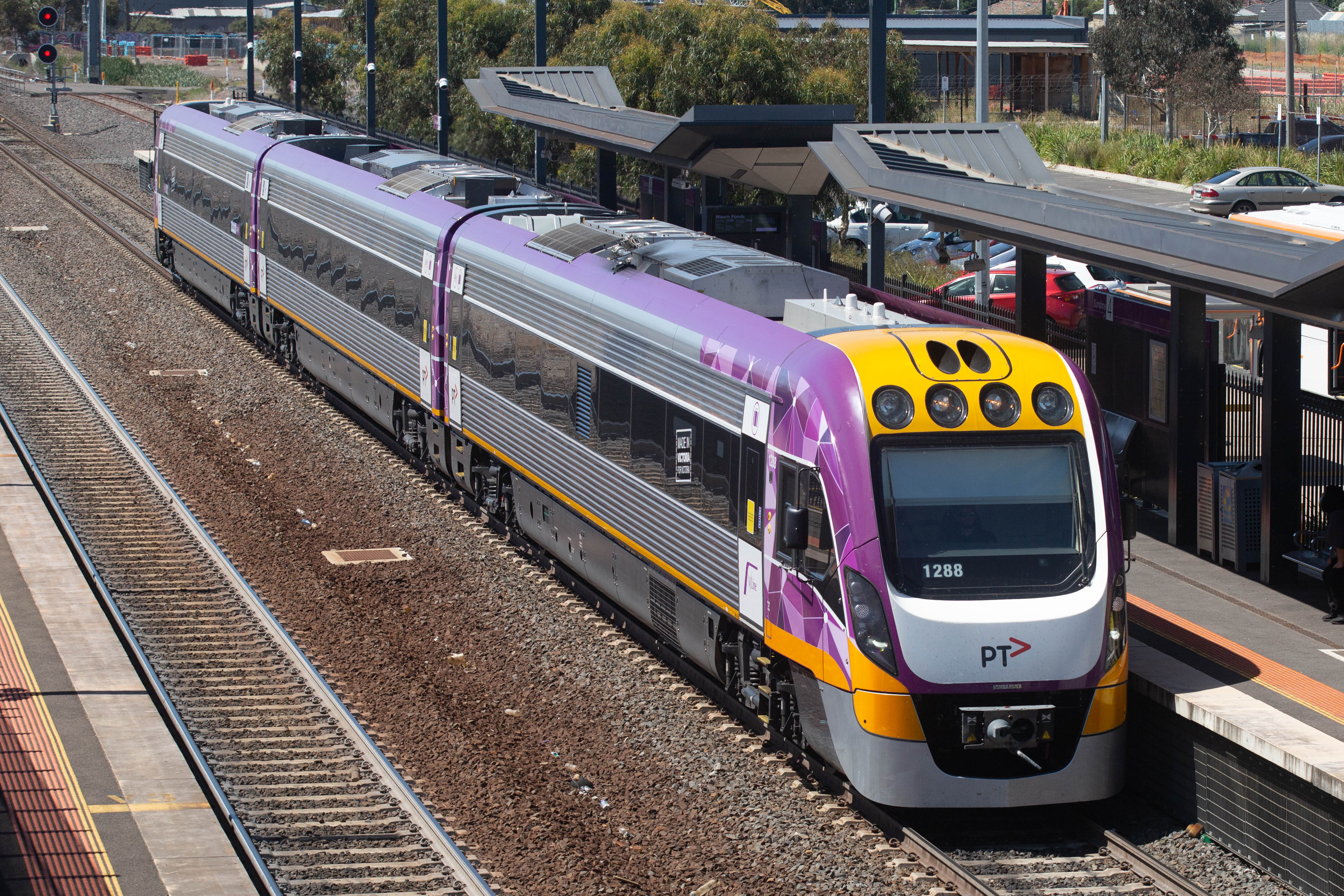
A V/Line VLocity

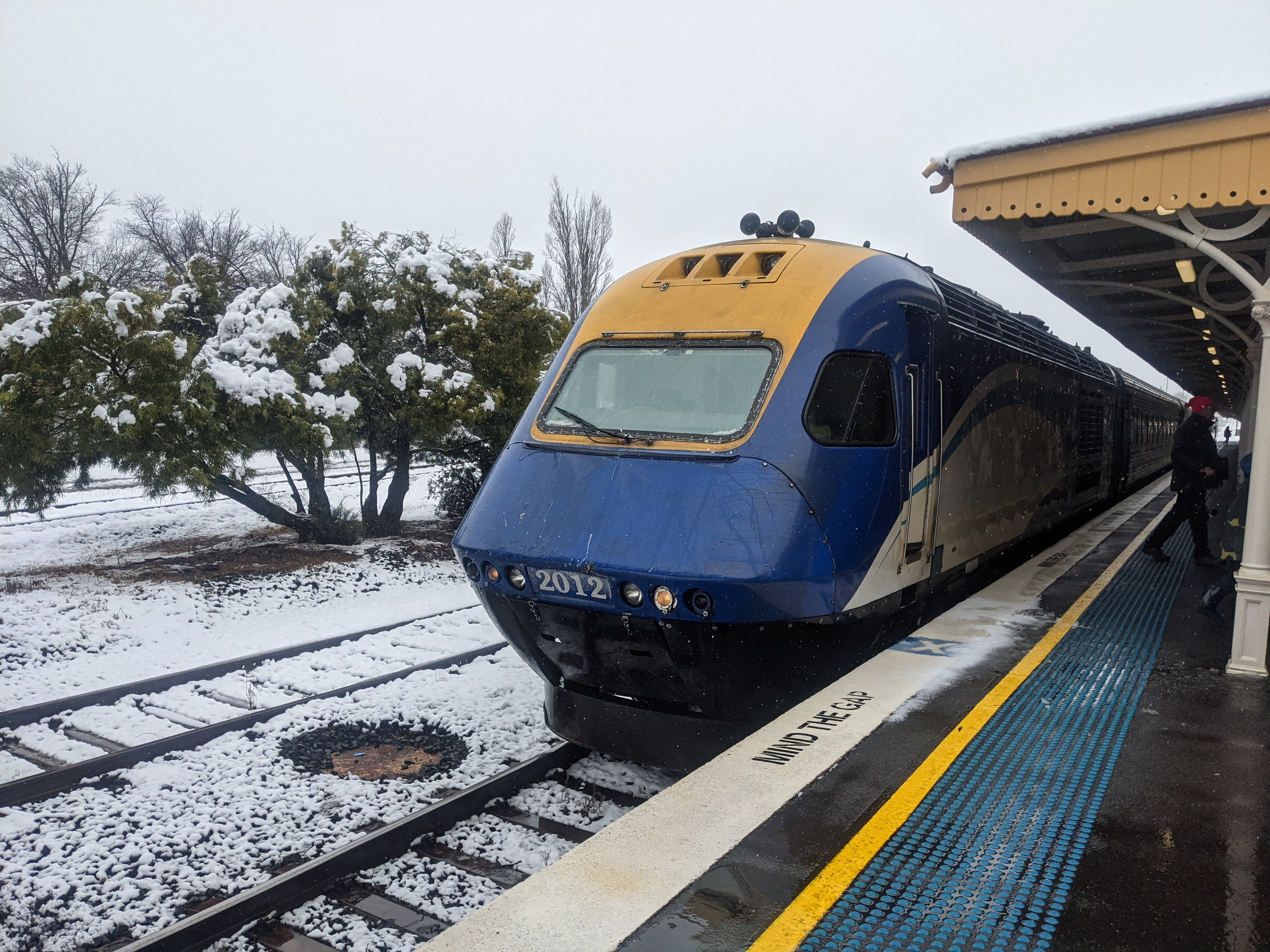
A New South Wales XPT at Orange station

Several medium-speed rail services operate on existing track that has been upgraded to accommodate faster services and/or tilting technology. Some of these services use high-speed capable rolling stock.

- In Western Australia, Westrail began using high-speed diesel railcars in 1971 on the Prospector service from Perth to Kalgoorlie, and set a new Australian speed record. Now operated by Transwa, the railcars were replaced in 2004 with new units capable of 200 km/h (124 mph), although track condition currently limits this to 160 km/h (100 mph). The same type of cars are used on the AvonLink service.
- New South Wales commenced operations with the XPT in 1982. Based on the British InterCity 125 train, it has a maximum service speed of 160 km/h (100 mph) and set an Australian speed record for the time of 193 km/h (120 mph) on a test run in 1992. The train is not often used to its full potential, operating along winding steam-era alignments; for example, the average speed on the Sydney–Melbourne route in 2002 was 75 kilometres per hour (47 miles per hour). New South Wales trialled the Swedish X 2000 tilt train in 1995. Propelled by two specially modified XPT power cars, the train carried passengers between Sydney and Canberra in an eight-week trial.
- Queensland Rail's Electric Tilt Train service operates from Brisbane to Rockhampton, while the Diesel Tilt Train service runs from Brisbane to Cairns. These routes were partially upgraded in the 1990s at a cost of $590 million, with the construction of 160 km/h (99 mph) of deviations to straighten curves. Both with a service speed of 160 km/h (100 mph), the electric train set an Australian rail speed record of 210 km/h (130 mph) in 1999.
- In Victoria, the state government upgraded railway lines as part of the Regional Fast Rail project, with V/Line operating VLocity diesel railcars at a maximum speed of 160 km/h (100 mph) over the lines. In the early stages of the project, the Victorian Government incorrectly referred to it as the 'Fast Train' or 'Very Fast Train', and this practice continues among some politicians and members of the public.

=== High-speed rail ===
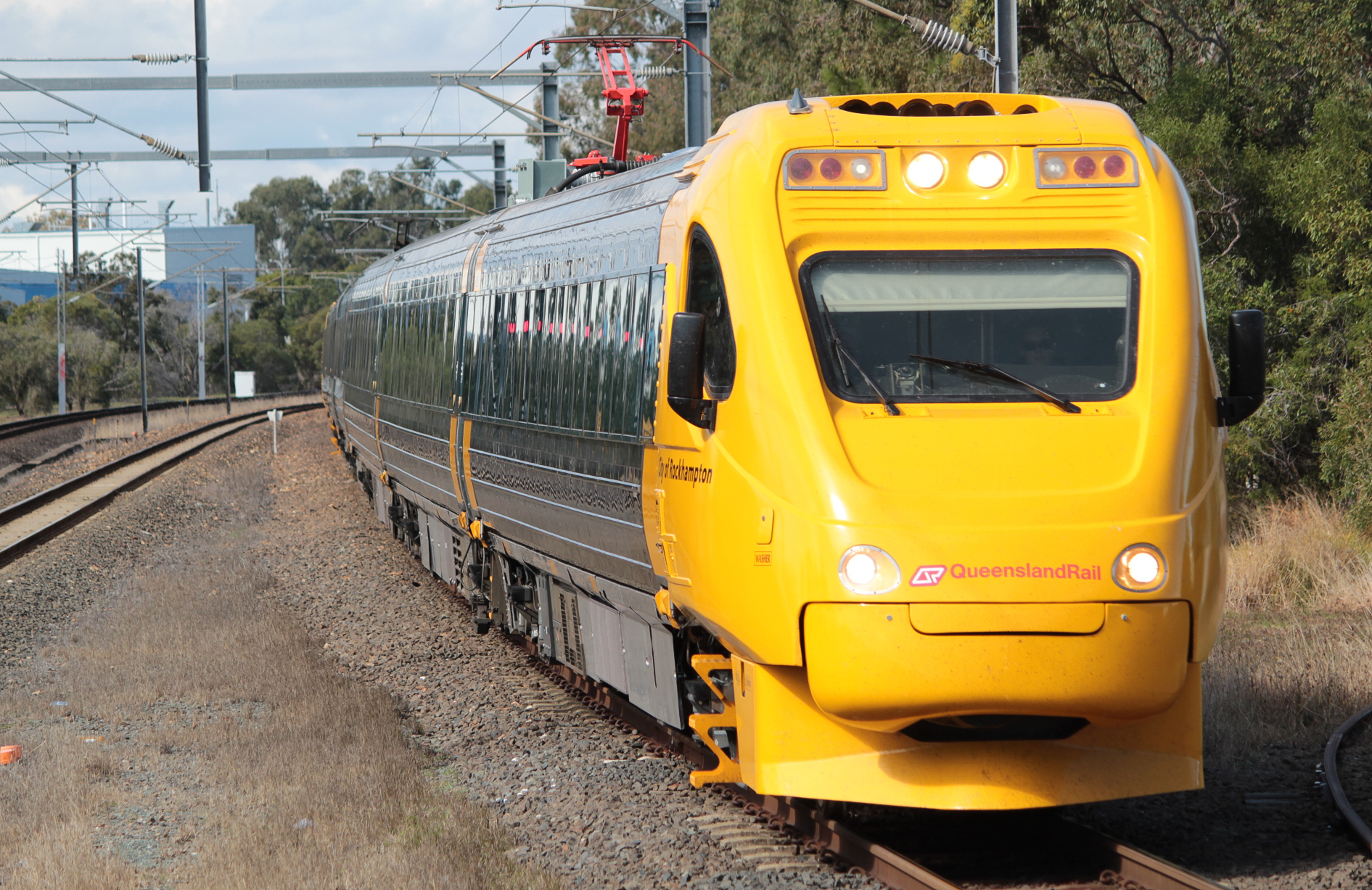
Electric Tilt Train at Sunshine station

High speed rail has been repeatedly raised as an option since the 1980s, and has had bipartisan support for research and land purchase.

The focus usually falls on Sydney to Melbourne, where it is seen as a competitor to the busy Sydney–Melbourne air corridor, with Sydney to Brisbane and (less often) Melbourne to Adelaide also proposed. The benefits of regional city development are frequently raised.

The most recent major study into interstate high-speed rail was undertaken from 2011 to 2013, after which the federal government indicated it would start purchasing land for a rail corridor, however this did not eventuate. In 2016 the prime minister indicated a high-speed rail link might be funded privately and by value capture.

The Queensland Rail Electric Tilt Train's record speed of 210 km/h (130 mph) is just above the internationally accepted definition of high-speed rail of 200 km/h (120 mph). The maximum test speed of 193 km/h (120 mph) set by NSW TrainLink's XPT is approximately that. The Transwa WDA/WDB/WDC class railcars used on the medium-speed Transwa Prospector service are high-speed capable, but are limited to 160 km/h (99 mph) in service. The XPT is also theoretically capable of reaching speeds of 200 km/h (120 mph).

== Regulation ==
Prior to 1993, the regulation of Australian Railways was under the control of the state-owned operators. The first move away from this arrangement was in New South Wales with the passing of the Rail Safety Act 1993. This Act moved the regulation away from the NSW State Rail Authority into the independent hands of the Transport Safety Bureau within the NSW Department of Transport. Each rail operator and rail infrastructure owner was accredited by the Regulator under the Rail Safety Act. This was the first such legislation in Australia and gradually, the different states passed similar forms of legislation.

With the opening up of the national rail network to private operators, the different pieces of state-based legislation provided the growing group of interstate operators with a complicated set of varying requirements for their operations. In December 2009, the Council of Australian Governments (COAG) agreed to establish a national rail safety regulator and develop a rail safety national law that the rail safety regulator would administer. Following an extensive consultation period with industry, governments and unions, a final version of the national legislation was approved by transport ministers in November 2011.

The Rail Safety National Law was first enacted in South Australia in 2012 and all other states and territories have either adopted it or passed legislation that models it. This legislation created the Office of The National Rail Safety Regulator (ONRSR), based in Adelaide. New South Wales, South Australia and Tasmania were the first states to come under ONRSR control, from 2013.
