= Railway tunnels in Queensland =

Name	Open	Length	Gradient	R/F	% Ruling	Bore	Breeze	Wet	Momentum	Fume	Accidents	Remarks
Boolboonda Tunnel	1883	m	in									(Mount Perry, rail heritage)
Border Tunnel QLD/NSW	1930	1660m	in									SG
Cherry Gully Tunnel	1880		in									(railway tunnel, Southern Downs Region)
Cross River Rail (Brisbane, rail)	-	10200m	in									Under construction
Dalveen Tunnel	1880		in									(railway tunnel, Southern Downs Region)
Dularcha Railway Tunnel	1891		in									(former railway tunnel, Sunshine Coast Region)
Lahey's Canungra Tramway Tunnel	1903		in									(Gold Coast, heritage) - c.1900
Main Range tunnels	1867	0886m	1 in 50	Rise	100%							9 tunnels
Many Peaks - Monto loop line		m	in									6 tunnels (disused railway line)
Muntapa Tunnel	1913		in									Cooyar, rail heritage)
Victoria Tunnel	1866	0537m	in									(Grandchester, rail)
Yimbun Railway Tunnel	1910	m	in									(railway tunnel, Somerset Region)
Teviot Range Tunnel Inland Railway	2022	1100m	in									proposed Dual SG/NG
Little Liverpool Range Tunnel Inland Railway	2022	750m	in									proposed Dual SG/NG
Toowoomba Range Tunnel Inland Railway	2022	6231m	in									proposed Dual SG/NG

== See also ==
- Construction of Queensland railways
