= Inland Rail =

Railway line under construction in Australia

- Location: Australia
- Proposer: Australian Government
- Project website: inlandrail.com.au
- Status: Under construction/partly shelved
- Type: Rail freight transport
- Start date: 2018
- Completion date: 2027 (Parkes–Melbourne)
- Map: Route alignment

Inland Rail is an Australian rail infrastructure project currently under construction and partially shelved. It was intended to facilitate long-distance rail freight transport with double-stacked freight trains, improving capacity and inter-state connections in eastern Australia.

The project was initially conceived of as a 1,600 km direct link between Melbourne and Brisbane via inland New South Wales. Construction commenced in 2018, and to date upgrades to several existing sections of railway line in New South Wales have been completed. The project is being led by Inland Rail Pty Ltd, a subsidiary of the government-owned Australian Rail Track Corporation.

Following an independent review of the project in 2022–23, work is continuing on the route from Parkes, in Central West New South Wales, southward to Melbourne, targeting a planned completion date of 2027. A route north of Parkes, intended to continue through to Brisbane, has been planned but shelved indefinitely due to a lack of government funding commitment and escalating costs.

== History ==
=== Early proposals ===
In 1889, a proposed standard gauge and partly mixed gauge line from Brisbane via Rosewood, Warwick and Wallangarra shortened the distance between Brisbane and Sydney by 55 miles (89 km).

In the 20th century, several proposals were made for an inland railway route connecting the east coast of Australia. In 1915, Prime Minister Andrew Fisher proposed a "strategic railway" connecting the South Australian city of Port Augusta to Brisbane, with connections to the New South Wales railway network, at an estimated cost of A£6,500,000. In 1979, TNT founder Ken Thomas proposed a route connecting Brisbane to Melbourne via Wallangarra, Orange and Albury, with possible connections to Adelaide and Perth.

=== Later proposals ===
In 1995, Queensland Rail detailed a $1.289 billion (equivalent to $2.52 billion in 2022) proposal for an inland railway corridor connecting Brisbane and Melbourne. New dual gauge track would follow the existing 1,067 mm (3 ft 6 in) narrow gauge Main Line to Toowoomba, the Western railway line to Wyreema and the Millmerran railway line to its terminus at Millmerran, with new track connecting to the Boggabilla railway line south of the New South Wales–Queensland border.

The route would then have continued along the 1,435 mm (4 ft 8 1/2 in) standard gauge Mungindi railway line until Bellata, with a new line connecting the Coonamble railway line via Wee Waa before once again following existing track: the Main Western railway line to Narromine; the Parkes–Narromine railway line to Parkes; the Stockinbingal–Parkes railway line to Stockinbingal; the Lake Cargelligo railway line to Cootamundra; the Main Southern railway line to Albury; and the North East railway line to Melbourne. A maximum line speed of 100 kilometres per hour (62 mph) would be in place for the corridor, with an additional $189 million (equivalent to $370.15 million in 2022) upgrade to existing track allowing for speeds of up to 160 kilometres per hour (99 mph) in sections.

In 1996, the Bureau of Transport and Communications Economics (BTCE) released a working paper assessing the proposal. It found a new route would save ten hours journey time on the existing coastal route via Sydney, reducing the operating cost for operators from $23.16/tonne to $17.56/tonne, but would facilitate only a small increase in grain production.

In September 2005, the federal Department of Transport and Regional Services commissioned a feasibility study into a Brisbane–Melbourne railway link, outlining four possible 'sub-corridors' between Junee and Brisbane. In May 2008, the newly elected Rudd government allocated $15 million to the Australian Rail Track Corporation (ARTC) to develop a route alignment following the Far Western sub-corridor as detailed in the 2006 study. The corporation's preliminary analysis was released in May 2009, which showed that the cheapest version of the inland railway would cost $2.8 billion to build and would allow freight to be moved from Melbourne to Brisbane in just over 27 hours. Despite this, the analysis also found that, if operational by 2020, the project's costs would outweigh any economic benefits by up to $1.1 billion.

The ARTC's final report was released in July 2010. The report recommended a route from Junee to Melbourne via Albury following the North East railway line, with the route from Moree to Brisbane to build along a new corridor through the Toowoomba range. The report forecast a delivery cost of $3.688 billion, with track duplication works between Junee and Melbourne and capacity for double-stacked freight trains between Melbourne and Parkes already budgeted by the ARTC.

=== Approval and funding ===
Inland Rail route envisaged in 2017

The Gillard government announced forward estimates of $300 million in the 2011 federal budget commencing 2014, with the Coalition committing to the funding following the election of the Abbott government in 2013. A further $594 million was allocated to ARTC by the Turnbull government in the 2016 federal budget to purchase land for the project, with an additional $8.4 billion in funding over seven years announced in the subsequent 2017 budget.

In the 2020 federal budget, the Morrison government pledged $150 million in funding for additional grade separation works in New South Wales, conditional upon a further $37.5 million commitment from the New South Wales state government.

The proposed route was to connect the rail yard at Tottenham, Victoria with the freight yards at Acacia Ridge and Bromelton in Queensland, using a combination of new and existing standard gauge and dual gauge track. Upgrades to existing track would facilitate the use of double-stacked container trains between the three yards.

=== Independent Review of Inland Rail ===
On 7 October 2022, the Australian Government announced an Independent Review of Inland Rail, after reports of a cost blowout to a projected $31b and delay in completion to 2030–31.

Undertaken by Kerry Schott AO, the Review report, released in April 2023, “confirmed that Inland Rail is an important project to meet Australia’s growing freight task, improve road safety and to help decarbonise our economy”. However, the Review also found “significant deficiencies in the governance and management of Inland Rail”.

The Government agreed to 19 of the Review's recommendations, including that the route be shortened to extend from Beveridge in Victoria to Ebenezer in Queensland and that existing rail lines be used wherever possible to minimise additional impacts on the environment and communities. New intermodal terminals were proposed to be developed in Melbourne, at Beveridge and Truganina. A third terminal was proposed for Ebenezer, Queensland. Upgrades to existing track were to facilitate the use of double-stacked container trains between the yards. Single-stacked trains were to pass through Ebenezer to Kagaru to connect to the existing Sydney to Brisbane Coastal line.

The Review also recommended that Inland Rail be completed in stages, with the Government deciding to “prioritise [the] Beveridge to Parkes [section]”, by 2027. The project would also be separated from ARTC, and a subsidiary company, Inland Rail Pty Ltd was operational from early 2024 to continue the construction of Inland Rail.

=== Shelving of route to Brisbane ===
In May 2026, following further re-evaluation of the project's costings, the Albanese Government announced the shelving of the project north of Parkes to Brisbane. An independent assessment commissioned by the government indicated that the full Brisbane–Melbourne route would cost more than $45 billion to complete, three times over the planned budget allocation, and could not be finished before 2036 at the earliest.

== Route ==
The original scope of the Inland Rail project as initially envisaged extended from Melbourne in Victoria, through New South Wales to Brisbane in Queensland. This route was divided into twelve sections for planning and construction, with 600 kilometres (370 mi) of new track and upgrades to 1,000 kilometres (620 mi) of existing track.

=== Victoria ===
Inland Rail project boundaries in Victoria

In Victoria, the Inland Rail route was planned to follow the existing North East railway line and Albion–Jacana railway line alignment. Between Beveridge and Seymour the route is mostly single track with several crossing loops between 870 m (2,850 ft) and 6,800 m (22,300 ft) in length. The line north of Seymour is double track, with a connection to the Oaklands railway line at Benalla.

Initial works on the corridor commenced in May 2020 as part of the $235 million North East Rail Line Upgrade, with John Holland contracted to upgrade the track for line speeds up to 130 km/h (81 mph).

The work was planned to involve replacing or modifying infrastructure at 12 sites between Beveridge and Albury:

- Replacing the Beaconsfield Parade bridge at Glenrowan
- Lowering the tracks under the Murray Valley Highway bridge at Barnawartha North
- Relocating the existing track and platform on the eastern side of the Wangaratta Station to the western side of the station
- Removing the two Wangaratta Station footbridges and replacing them with a single pedestrian underpass
- Lowering the tracks and replacing the Green Street bridge at Wangaratta
- Replacing the Seymour-Avenel Road bridge at Seymour
- Relocating tracks (tracks slews), raising signal gantries and modifying overhead powerlines in numerous areas along the rail line
- Modifying Euroa Station precinct (relocating the western rail track, building a new station platform, and adding a new pedestrian underpass) and replacing the Anderson Street bridge with a vehicle underpass
- Relocating tracks at Benalla Station and removing the existing Benalla Station Approach Road overpass
- Replacing multiple road bridges at Wandong and Broadford with higher bridges structures,

=== New South Wales ===
Inland Rail project boundaries in New South Wales

From Albury, the route was planned to continue along the Main South railway line to Illabo. Initial consultations on this section of the route commenced in 2018, with upgrades planned to 185 kilometres (115 mi) of track. A new section of track is planned to be built between Illabo and Stockinbingal, 37 kilometres (23 mi) connecting the Main South railway line to the Stockinbingal–Parkes railway line and bypassing Cootamundra and the Bethungra Spiral.

The route continues along the line from Stockinbingal to Parkes, with construction works to modify sections of the 173 kilometres (107 mi) of track starting in late 2023. A further 98.4 kilometres (61.1 mi) of track has been upgraded between Parkes and Narromine, in addition to the construction of a new 5.3 kilometres (3.3 mi) connection with the Broken Hill railway line west of Parkes allowing services to connect to Adelaide and Perth.

An approximately 300 kilometres (190 mi) stretch of track between Narromine and Narrabri was planned to be built along a new alignment. It was the longest stage of the project and presently cancelled. A further 186 kilometres (116 mi) of existing railway between Narrabri and North Star was to be upgraded, with a bypass at Camurra to remove a long hairpin.

The route was then planned to continue from North Star and the New South Wales / Queensland border with 14 kilometres (8.7 mi) of new track construction and 25 kilometres (16 mi) of upgrades to existing track required. This section would have completed one of the key missing rail links between New South Wales and Queensland, using the non-operational rail corridor or new track to connect to the operating line running to Yelarbon.

=== Queensland ===
Inland Rail project boundaries in Queensland

The Independent Inland Rail Review in April 2023 proposed the Inland Rail service offering for double-stacked trains in Queensland, totalling more than 330 kilometres (210 mi), would run from the New South Wales—Queensland border to a proposed new intermodal terminal at Ebenezer. Single-stacked trains will pass through Ebenezer to Kagaru to connect to the existing Sydney to Brisbane Coastal line.

These sections were to be built as dual gauge, connecting services on both the interstate standard gauge and Queensland narrow gauge networks.

South-west of Yelarbon, the Inland Rail route would have joined the alignment of the South Western railway line where it extends to south of Inglewood, with a new alignment connecting the now-closed Millmerran line north-east of Millmerran. New track was to be built between Southbrook and Gowrie Junction, with the route bypassing Toowoomba to Helidon on a new line and then along an upgraded Western line as far east as Calvert and new line 53 kilometres (33 mi) to Kagaru.

=== Tunnels ===
There were three tunnels proposed for Queensland, to allow for double-stack rail transport and dual gauge and single-track railway. These are:

- Teviot Range Tunnel Inland Railway - 1,100 metres (3,600 ft)
- Little Liverpool Range Tunnel Inland Railway - 850 metres (2,790 ft)
- Toowoomba Range Tunnel Inland Railway - 600 metres (2,000 ft)

These tunnels were to replace the original narrow gauge-only tunnels between Grandchester and Toowoomba with a faster and more maintainable alignment.

== Construction ==
=== Chronology ===
In October 2018, INLink, a joint-venture between BMD Constructions and Fulton Hogan, was awarded a $310 million contract for stage 1 of the project between Parkes and Narromine. Work on the Parkes–Narromine railway line and the new Broken Hill railway line connection commenced in December 2018. More than 1,800 people were employed on the project, with works completed in September 2020.

=== Opposition to construction ===
The Narrabri and Baradine Aboriginal Land Councils have stated their opposition to the Narromine to Narrabri section of the project, planned to be built on an alignment through the Pilliga forests which contain various Aboriginal heritage sites. A route through the Pilliga forests was announced by Minister for Infrastructure, Darren Chester, in November 2017, despite initial plans by the ARTC to build the line through surrounding farmland.

Landholders and farmers have opposed several sections of the project on environmental grounds. In September 2017, Chester announced the Yelarbon to Gowrie section would be built through the Condamine River floodplain, which reached its highest recorded level in the 2010–11 Queensland floods. As a consequence, the Inland Rail project was referred to the Senate Rural and Regional Affairs and Transport References Committee in 2019, with the committee chair, Senator Glenn Sterle, critical of ARTC for a lack of consultation with communities along the alignment. Although the ARTC reaffirmed the Yelarbon to Gowrie route would remain across the floodplain, in June 2020, Deputy Prime Minister, Michael McCormack, ordered a review of the alignment.

In July 2020, the New South Wales branch of the Country Women's Association, along with the NSW Farmers' Association, commenced legal proceedings against ARTC, seeking an independent hydrology review into the Narromine to Narrabri stage of the project.

== See also ==
- Adelaide–Darwin rail corridor, a similar north–south rail corridor connecting inland Australia
- Rail transport in Australia
- Advanced Train Management System, to be fitted to those sections not fitted with regular signalling such as centralized traffic control
- Railway tunnels in Queensland, Australia
- Main Line railway, Queensland § First tunnels

== Bibliography ==
- Economic effects of a Brisbane-Melbourne inland railway (PDF) (Report). Canberra: Bureau of Transport and Communications Economics. March 1996. 0 642 24518 5. Archived (PDF) from the original on 24 March 2020.
- Melbourne–Brisbane Inland Rail Alignment Study: Final report (PDF) (Report). Canberra: Australian Rail Track Corporation. July 2010. Archived (PDF) from the original on 24 October 2020.
- North–South Rail Corridor Study Executive Report (PDF) (Report). Canberra: Ernst & Young. 30 June 2006. Archived (PDF) from the original on 5 March 2020.
