= Boggabilla =

- Town
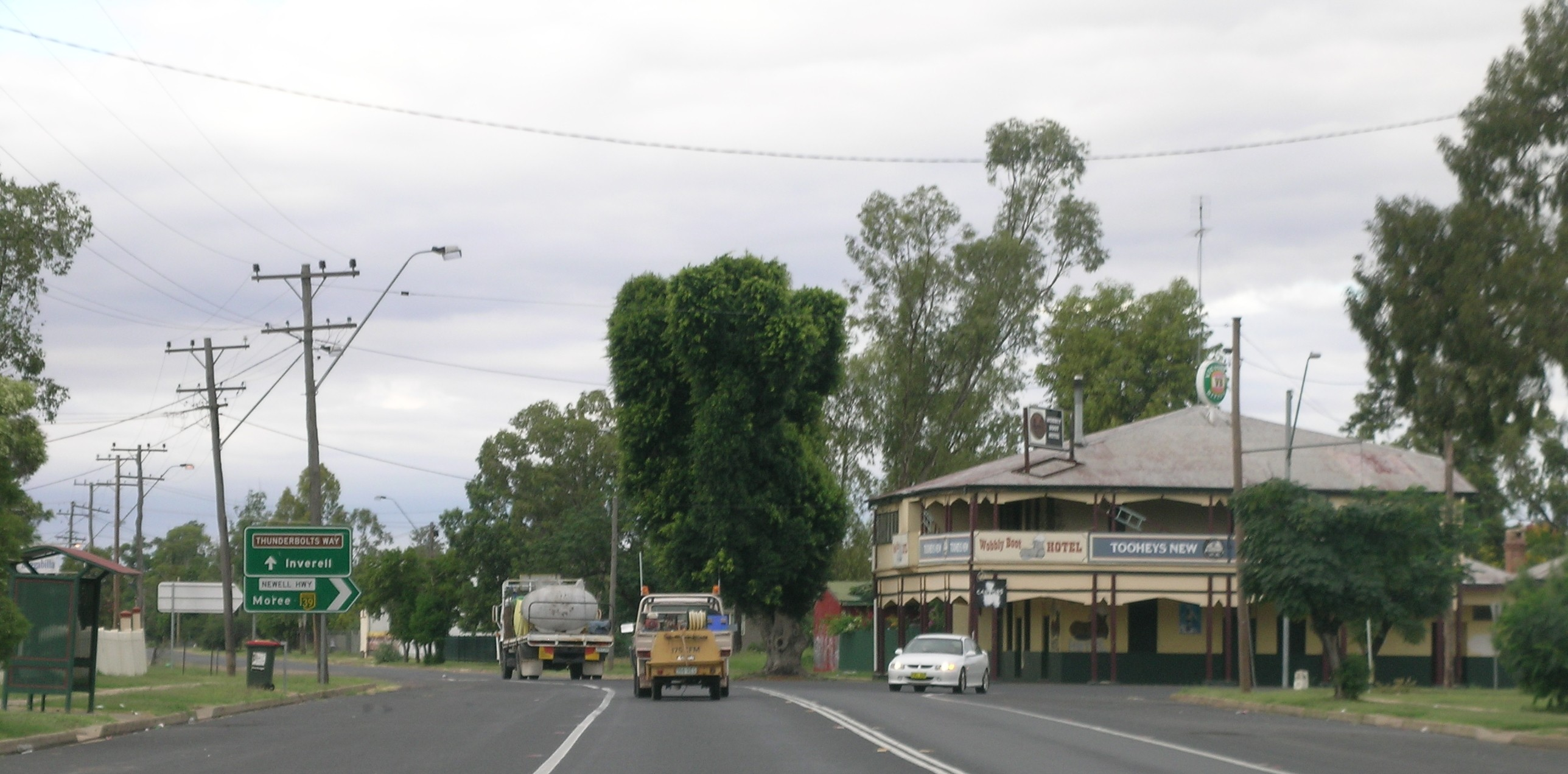
- The Wobbly Boot Hotel at Boggabilla

- Coordinates: 28°36′0″S 150°21′0″E
- Country: Australia
- State: New South Wales
- LGA: Moree Plains Shire
- Location: 703 km (437 mi) NW of Sydney; 357 km (222 mi) SW of Brisbane; 115 km (71 mi) NE of Moree; 9 km (5.6 mi) SE of Goondiwindi

Government
  - State electorate: Northern Tablelands
  - Federal division: Parkes

Population
  - Total: 529 (2021 census)
- Postcode: 2409

Boggabilla /ˈbɒɡəbɪlə/ is a small town in the far north of inland New South Wales, Australia in Moree Plains Shire. At the 2021 census, the town had a population of 529, of which 43.5% identified as Aboriginal or Torres Strait Islander descent.

The name Boggabilla comes from Gamilaraay bagaaybila, literally "full of creeks". The same "creek" element is found in the name of Boggabri.

== Geography ==
Boggabilla is located on the southern bank of the Macintyre River, north of Moree. The Newell Highway passes through Boggabilla and is met by the Bruxner Way at a junction in the centre of town. Surrounding localities include Toomelah Station 15 km (9.3 mi) to the east, while the larger town of Goondiwindi is 9 km (5.6 mi) northwest, across the border in Queensland.

== History ==
The Boggabilla region is situated roughly on the border of two large language groups of Aboriginal Australians, the Bigambul and the northern clans of the Gamilaraay. British colonisation had a devastating effect on these people, with many being killed in frontier conflict and the Bigambul language now being extinct.

The first British to enter the region were squatter pastoralists who started to take land in the early 1840s. Around 1843, George Yeomans and Otto Baldwin formed the Boggabilla pastoral station. They and their stockmen skirmished with the local Aboriginal men over occupation of the land and it wasn't until the arrival of the government funded Native Police force under Commandant Frederick Walker in 1849 that armed Aboriginal resistance around Boggabilla was put down.

The township of Boggabilla was formed and allotments were first offered for sale in 1863.

=== Boggabilla Aboriginal Reserve and Boggabilla Aboriginal Station ===
Located on the traditional land of the Gamilaraay people, following colonisation there has been a government gazetted Aboriginal reserve or station in this district on the border between Queensland and New South Wales since 1891.

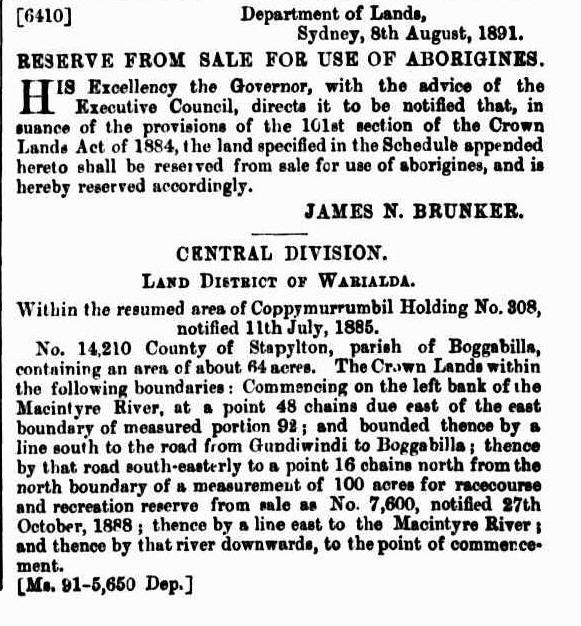
Article from the NSW Government Gazette 8 August 1891 reserving land for the use of Aboriginal people

- 1891 - Boggabilla Aboriginal Reserve (AR 14,120) was gazetted by the New South Wales government on 8 August 1891 and revoked on 24 May 1918. The Reserve was 457 acres in the parish of Boggabilla and the county of Staplyton located on the southern bank of the MacIntyre River.
- 1896 - a temporary reserve was revoked
- 1912 - A station was created at Euraba reserve, west of Boggabilla. A teacher-manager was appointed.
- 1925 - The station moved to a new reserve, Toomelah AR 66833, AR 66834.
- 1938 - The Aborigines' Protection Board announced plans for a new Aboriginal settlement on a site of 450 acres at the junction of the Macintyre and Dumaresq Rivers, nine miles from Boggabilla. About 200 Aboriginal people from the Toomelah Station, where the water supply failed, were to be accommodated there.
- 1939 - Residents from Toomelah and some other camps were resettled by the government in housing on the Boggabilla Aboriginal Reserve.
- 1940 - Boggabilla Aboriginal Station was built on the southern bank of the MacIntyre River.
- 1975 - The NSW Aboriginal Lands Trust was given the freehold title to look after the reserve for the people.
- 1984 - The Toomelah Local Aboriginal Land Council became the owner.

== Demographics ==
According to the 2021 census of Population, there were 529 in Boggabilla.

- Aboriginal and Torres Strait Islander people made up 43.5% of the population.
- About 63.5% of people were born in Australia and 65.4% of people only spoke English at home.
- 56.2% identified as Christian and 28.5% identified as having no religious affiliation.

== Transport ==
Boggabilla used to have a railway service, but this has been cut back to North Star, New South Wales, where the last silo is located. Also, an airport and shuttle services are available to Sydney from Moree located 110 km south of Boggabilla. Daily bus services run both north and south.

== Health ==
The nurses at Boggabilla Health Centre provide services such as preschool screening and immunisation.

== Education ==
Boggabilla Central School has preparatory, primary, and secondary grades) and a TAFE (a campus of TAFE NSW).

| Preceding station | Former services | Following station |
|---|---|---|
| Terminus | Boggabilla Line | Wearne towards Camurra |
