= Camurra railway station =

Railway station in New South Wales, Australia

Coordinates: 29°24′11″S 149°55′15″E

Camurra is a former railway station in northern New South Wales.

The station is the junction for the branch line to Boggabilla, now cut back to North Star.

It was constructed in the late 1920s and early 1930s.

== Layout ==
The station layout is unusual for two reasons.

Firstly the junction is at Camurra rather than at the important centre of Moree to avoid the need for an extra large bridge over the Gwydir River.

Secondly, although the branch heads off to the east, the junction is at the western end of Camurra, requiring a 180 degree curve. This curve allows Boggabilla trains to reach Moree without the need to run around the engines. The junction is at the Mungindi end of Camurra station to allow trains from North Star to shunt or cross at Camurra if required.

Preceding station	Former services	Following station
Ashley towards Mungindi	Mungindi Line	Moree towards Werris Creek
Wongabinda towards Boggabilla	Boggabilla Line	Terminus
