= Boggabilla railway line =

Railway line in New South Wales, Australia

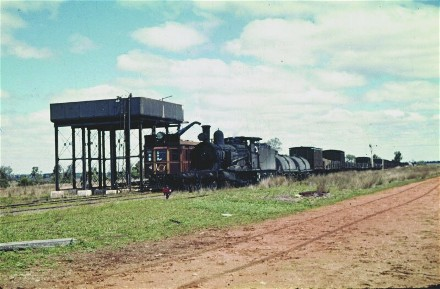
3228 crosses a CPH railmotor at Crooble in October 1959

The Boggabilla railway line is a disused railway line in New South Wales, Australia. It branches from the Mungindi railway line at Camurra and ran for 130 kilometres (81 mi) to Boggabilla.

== Construction ==
When the line was first approved it ran through mainly grazing country, and few could have envisaged the development of grain production after the 1940s in the area. The line was authorised mainly to ensure that the output of grazing properties in the area went south through New South Wales ports rather than north, across the border to Queensland.

The line involved only light earthworks, but did include the crossing of a number of watercourses. By mid-1928, clearing had been completed to the 23-mile (37 km) point and work steadily continued until 1930 when, due to a shortage of funds, progress was halted for six months.

== Opening ==
The line was eventually opened throughout on 20 June 1932.

== Traffic ==
Upon opening, the train service comprised a twice-weekly mixed train running from Moree to Boggabilla on Mondays and Fridays, returning the following day. From 24 February 1936, a weekly CPH railmotor service was introduced, which was later increased to thrice weekly, Mondays, Wednesdays and Fridays. The railmotor services were day-returns from Moree. Goods trains operated as well.

Bulk wheat storages at locations along the line first appeared in 1956, bringing additional traffic to the line. The use of 48 class diesel locomotives began in 1959, speeding up the movement of grain and other freight.

Passenger services came to an abrupt halt when the railmotor service was cancelled on 3 August 1974, officially as a consequence of the 1973 oil crisis. Goods services were also reduced at that time, being replaced by road trucks working out of Moree.

By 1978, rail freight services were largely worked on a seasonal basis, hauling wheat, with an occasional train to Boggabilla to collect sleepers milled locally.

== Demise ==
Since the 1970s, the lines radiating from Moree have been operated on a seasonal basis only, serving the needs of the grain producers. The stationmaster at Boggabilla was withdrawn in 1979. In 1987, the line was truncated at North Star and grain was trucked by road to the silos there and at Crooble. The last train to Boggabilla ran on 23 November 1987. In November 2013, the remainder of the line was booked out of use. It was able to be reopened with 14-days notice, and was reopened in full for three weeks from 28 July 2014.

The Melbourne to Brisbane inland rail project proposed refurbishing the line and reinstating the North Star to Boggabilla section. However, in May 2026, the federal government announced that the project would no longer proceed north of Parkes, citing cost blow-outs.
