= Windy Station Woolshed =

- Location within New South Wales Location within Australia
- 31.5959°S 150.3844°E
- Location: Windy Road, Pine Ridge, Liverpool Plains Shire, New South Wales, Australia

History
- Built: 1901

Site notes
- Architect: Fred B Menkens

New South Wales Heritage Register
- Official name: Windy Station Woolshed
- Type: State heritage (built)
- Designated: 19 January 2018
- Reference no.: 1963
- Type: Woolshed/Shearing Shed
- Category: Farming and Grazing
- Builders: Thomas and William Cowan

Windy Station Woolshed is a heritage-listed shearing shed at Windy Road, Pine Ridge, Liverpool Plains Shire, New South Wales, Australia. It was designed by Fred B Menkens and built in 1901 by Thomas and William Cowan. It was added to the New South Wales State Heritage Register on 19 January 2018.

== History ==
=== Pre and Contact Aboriginal Custodianship ===
The original Warrah Station, now known as East Warrah Station and Windy Station was established as part of the traditional lands of the Kamilaroi people who cared for the land and sustained themselves hunting the birds, insects and animals of the plains and gathering and processing vegetables. There were strong trade and ceremonial ties with the Wonnarua Aboriginal people whose main country lay in the inland regions of the Hunter and Upper Hunter Valley.

The Kamilaroi were a large nation of Aboriginal people extending from the Upper Hunter through to the Warrumbungle Mountains in the west and to the lower reaches of south west Queensland. This nation was made up of many smaller family groups who shared the gamilaraay language.

The Kamilaroi had a reputation as fierce warriors who defended their familial hunting grounds from other intruding bands and who also actively resisted European settlement for many years. One source noted that more than 500 Aboriginal and 15 Europeans were killed between 1832 and 1838 as European fortune hunters flooded into the Upper Hunter and Liverpool Plains area to settle.

=== Exploration and settlement ===
The opening up of the Upper Hunter and Liverpool Plains area was facilitated in the first instance by explorers Benjamin Singleton and John Howe in 1818 and again in 1821. In this later journey Howe reached as far as the current location of Maitland which he appraised as being good sheep country. In 1824 it was Henry Dangar who reached land to the west of Murrurundi in search of new grazing land. The next ten years saw an influx of hundreds of settlers to take up Crown lands grants in the Valley and Plains beyond.

Despite the Aboriginal resistance to settlement, pressure from Europeans settling on and restricting access to land and its resources and the appalling effects of western disease on the indigenous peoples, resulted in their complete dispossession from their traditional land. By the mid to late 19th Century many Aboriginal people in the area had either accepted European life and settled in villages and towns or, perhaps more commonly, found residence on government reserves in the area such as Caroona near Quirindi or at St Clair reserve (later, 1905 St Clair Mission) between Singleton and Carrowbrook. The reserves allowed Aboriginal people to survive by farming and also using traditional hunting and gathering skills.

=== The Australian Agricultural Company ===
The Australian Agricultural Company (AACo) was formed under an act of British Parliament in 1824 as a result of the recommendations of Commissioner Bigge. Bigge recommended that private investment and enterprise, possibly in the growing of fine wool, was a crucial measure in the viable future of the Colony of NSW. Working capital of A£1 million pounds was recommended to be granted as was the promise of a Crown Grant of four hundred thousand hectares (one million acres).

A group of potential investors headed by John Macarthur (son of John Macarthur of the notorious NSW Rum Corps) soon formed and in June 1824 the AACo was enacted in Parliament. By November 1824, a Royal Charter was issued and agents appointed in the colony to act on behalf of the Company. These were James Macarthur, H. H. Macarthur and James Bowman, later husband to Miss Macarthur. Surveyor General John Oxley was consulted on the possible location of land suitable for growing fine wool. After rejecting his suggestions of land in the Liverpool Plains, Upper Hunter, Bathurst and Upper Hastings River on the grounds these areas were either too far from the coast and transportation, or too densely settled, land at Port Stephens was chosen and the company began to establish itself there by 1926.

In the first years of its operation the AACo struggled to establish its ambitious enterprise and this was not helped by the fact that the land at Port Stephens was not particularly suitable for raising sheep. It was not until after 1829 when Sir Edward Parry was appointed commissioner of the company that the search for suitable fine wool growing land began in earnest and Parry proposed a swap of land at Port Stephens for another more appropriate tract of land. In 1831 on the advice of surveyor Henry Dangar, Parry made the decision to select two large runs at Warrah Creek and Goonoo Goonoo which were considered favourable for raising fine-wool sheep. Finally in 1833, after the initial rejection of the scheme by Governor Bourke and then the insistence of the Colonial Office in London, two grants of 9,700 hectares (24,000 acres) (Warrah) and 150 hectares (360 acres) (Goonoo Goonoo) were made to the AACo.

=== East Warrah Station and Windy Station ===
Development of the pastoral lands at Warrah was slow due to the shortage of available water on the run and the downturn in the demand for wool during the 1840s. In fact the company's aim to establish a leading fine wool growing enterprise in the colony was sidelined by the fact that the AACo put most of its energy and resources into its profitable coal mining enterprises. It was not until the company came under the management of a new commissioner, Mr Hodgson, that it refocused on developing its fine wool growing enterprise and in 1862 received an allocation of A£30,000 to develop sheep breeding and shearing facilities at Warrah. Warrah remained the head station and central focus of the stations shearing activities up until the turn of the century. At that time, in 1901, work began on the design and construction of a large, new and handsome woolshed at Windy Station. By April 1901 it was clear that the sawmill established on Windy Station would not be able to supply the massive amounts of timber required for the new Federation Carpenter-style woolshed so timber was brought in from Narrabri and Curlewis. By October 1901 the huge shed was in use at its first shearing utilising the newly fitted Burgon shearing machines, hydraulic dumper and wool press.

The pressure for closer settlement brought to bear on Warrah Station at the turn of the century and the eastern part of the run around Willow Tree was subdivided in 1908. A further government resumption of 18,000 hectares (45,000 acres) occurred and was sold in 1911 and still further subdivision and sales of east Warrah occurred in 1914, 1935 and 1967 resulting in the gradual withdrawal of the company from Warrah station to other properties. In 1969 the Warrah homestead was sold and the company interests in the area comprised approximately 13,000 hectares (33,000 acres) on Windy Station in the north west corner of the original grant. Windy Station was purchased by Romani Pastoral Company in 1997.

Currently cattle are run on Windy Station and there is also some cropping. Windy Station also has sheep fattening in the paddocks and each year a small number, around 20,000 sheep may be shorn at the windy woolshed. Other uses for the shed include the occasional wedding reflecting the shed's 20th century role as a bit of a social hub for the local community who attended parties and all night dances at the woolshed.

== Description ==
Windy Station Woolshed is a huge Federation Carpenter style structure built during 1901. The entire structure, shearing shed, wool room and sweating pens were constructed of timber with a corrugated iron roof. The timber was initially cut from trees on the property but was later supplemented by timber sourced from Curlewis and Narrabri. The upright members of the wool room and shearing shed are cut from single trees and extend from the foundation piers through to the roof.

The shearing shed and wool room were designed in the efficient T plan that was introduced to woolshed design in the 1870s. The shearing shed originally contained 44 stands and has a large clerestory-roof which provided light and ventilation for the shearers. Behind the shearing board with its lofty clerestory roof are located the sheep race and catching pens The external walls of the shearing shed and sweating pens are not solid but are a timber lattice screen or vertical timber slats.

The adjacent large wool room is solidly constructed of timber and still contains its original wool press and dump press as well as wicker wool baskets, wool tables and wool storage areas. The wool room'swestern wall has two double doorways with timber doors used to load wool bales onto transportation. Above the doors are a set of windows and above that two circular unglazed windows said to encourage the owl's access to the shed to deal with rodents.

The shearing shed was constructed with a mechanised board powered by a steam engine located adjacent to the northern wall of the wool room evidence of which is still in situ. This powered a long drive shaft set on bearings beneath the shed and connected to a belt that drove a pulley beneath the shearing board floor which is still evident. A second belt passed through the floor to drive a pulley and shaft mounted high above the shearing board. Belts from this shaft drove the shearing gear. The external steam engine also powered the hydraulic accumulator that provided pressure to the wool press and dump press. These elements are all still in place. The complicated arrangement for driving the shearing shed was replaced by an oil engine set within an engine room opened up by removal of the first four shearing stands adjacent to the expert's room. The oil engine has been replaced by an electric motor set at the northern end of the board.

To the east of the shearing shed and it's sheep race and catching pens is a timber sheep bridge which connects to the large sweating pens. The bridge itself is gated at intervals allowing control of sheep movement between the sweating pens and the main shearing shed.

=== Condition ===
The building is in generally good condition for its age, although there is evidence of extensive deterioration of the bases of posts below the wool potential: room. The site has moderate archaeological potential.

=== Modifications and dates ===
Removal of the steam engine drive & replacement with oil engine set within what were originally shearing boards. Dismantling of the dumping press hydraulic system. Installation of electric drive for the shearing gear.

=== Further information ===
The building has a very high degree of integrity.

== Heritage listing ==
As at 21 April 2015, Windy Station Woolshed is of state heritage significance for its historical role in the development of the fine wool industry the colony of NSW and its association with the Australian Agricultural Company (AACo), the colony's first private enterprise established with the aim of developing the fine wool industry in NSW. Designed using the best practice principles of the time and incorporating then cutting edge technology, Windy Station Woolshed, dating from 1901 demonstrates that the AACo had achieved a high water mark of design and excellence in one of Australia's most profitable industries of the time, the production of fine wool. The shed also demonstrates, through its high productivity, the enviable level of achievement reached by the AACo after almost 80 years' operation.

The Windy Station Woolshed's state heritage significance is enhanced through its association with the outstanding AACo superintendent Jesse Gregson who was also a noted amateur Botanist who contributed greatly to the Botanic Gardens National Herbarium of NSW.

Windy Station Woolshed is of state heritage significance for its aesthetic qualities as a large and majestic example of Federation Carpenter architecture with a strong resemblance to the large finger wharves constructed in Sydney around the same time. The woolshed is a landmark dominating the entrance to Windy Station, one of the most profitable and important historical pastoral stations in NSW.

Its aesthetic significance also lies in that it is an excellently executed and innovative example of an early 20th century woolshed design, that incorporates and efficient process-flow layout and incorporates an efficiently designed mechanised shearing board.

Windy Station Woolshed is of state significance for its research potential as its extensive extant fabric coupled with the overall design facilitating an efficient process flow layout and incorporating an efficiently designed mechanised shearing board clearly demonstrates the working of a productive and high quality early 20th Century woolshed set up to process fine wool. It likely has rarity values as its design and construction and intact condition is quite unique in NSW. It is also representative of the AACo's quest to develop a fine wool enterprise in NSW and is a fine example of the technological and design development of woolsheds across NSW during the 19th Century.

Windy Station Woolshed was listed on the New South Wales State Heritage Register on 19 January 2018 having satisfied the following criteria.

The place is important in demonstrating the course, or pattern, of cultural or natural history in New South Wales.

Windy Station Woolshed is of state heritage significance because it represents the achievement of a technological high point in the AACo s development of a fine wool enterprise in New South Wales. The company had been established in 1824 for this purpose. Development of Warrah as a centre for fine wool production commenced in 1862 and the construction of Windy Woolshed in 1901 demonstrated that the company had achieved excellence in the way it grew and handled its product. The woolshed demonstrates the levels of best practice achieved by the Australian wool industry after almost a century of development. The shed also demonstrates through its productivity the level of achievement reached by the AACo after almost 80 years' operation.

The place has a strong or special association with a person, or group of persons, of importance of cultural or natural history of New South Wales's history.

The Windy Station Woolshed's state heritage significance is enhanced through its direct associations with the AACo and its objective of developing a fine wool industry in NSW. It also has associations with the outstanding AACo superintendent Jesse Gregson, who was also a noted amateur Botanist who contributed greatly to the Botanic Gardens National Herbarium of NSW. Gregson was AACo superintendent of the AAC from 1975 to 1905. It was during his period of management that Windy woolshed was constructed and equipped.

The place is important in demonstrating aesthetic characteristics and/or a high degree of creative or technical achievement in New South Wales.

Windy Station Woolshed is of state heritage significance for its aesthetic qualities as a majestic example of Federation Carpenter architecture. The design of the shearing shed bears a strong resemblance to the large finger wharves constructed in Sydney designed and constructed around the same time. The woolshed is a vast complex and has a majestic presence in the landscape, dominating the entrance to Windy Station, one of the most profitable and important historical pastoral stations in NSW.

Its aesthetic significance also lies in that it is an excellently executed and innovative example of an early 20th century woolshed design, that incorporates and efficient process flow layout and incorporates an efficiently designed mechanised shearing board.

The place has potential to yield information that will contribute to an understanding of the cultural or natural history of New South Wales.

Windy Station Woolshed is of state significance for its research potential. Its surviving fabric includes most of the working components of a hydraulic dumping press and archaeological evidence of three phases of power transmission technology as well as its mechanised shearing apparatus. This extant fabric coupled with the overall design which facilitates a process flow layout and incorporating a well-designed mechanised shearing board clearly demonstrates the working of an efficient and high quality early 20th Century woolshed set up to process fine wool.

The place possesses uncommon, rare or endangered aspects of the cultural or natural history of New South Wales.

It is of state heritage significance as a rare and intact example of a large and efficient woolshed with material evidence of its original equipment and fit-out. Its finessed layout to promote the flow of work processes through the shed and attention to airflow through the building via the clerestory structure make it almost unique in NSW. Windy Station Woolshed is also a rare intact example of a large woolshed complete with dumping press.

The place is important in demonstrating the principal characteristics of a class of cultural or natural places/environments in New South Wales.

It is of state heritage significance because the woolshed is representative of the AACo's quest to develop a fine wool enterprise in NSW. Windy Station Woolshed is a fine example of the technological and design development of woolsheds across NSW during the 19th Century.

== See also ==
- Agriculture in Australia
- East Warrah Woolshed
