= East Warrah Woolshed =

- Location within New South Wales Location within Australia
- 31.6513°S 150.6635°E
- Location: Merriwa-Murrurundi Road, Warrah Creek, Liverpool Plains Shire, New South Wales, Australia

History
- Built: 1863–1864

Site notes
- Architect: Samuel Craik

New South Wales Heritage Register
- Official name: East Warrah Woolshed
- Type: state heritage (built)
- Designated: 10 August 2018
- Reference no.: 1962
- Type: Woolshed/Shearing Shed
- Category: Farming and Grazing

East Warrah Woolshed is a heritage-listed shearing shed on the Merriwa-Murrurundi Road, at Warrah Creek, in the North West Slopes region of New South Wales, Australia. It was designed by Samuel Craik and built from 1863 to 1864. It was added to the New South Wales State Heritage Register on 10 August 2018.

== History ==
=== Pre and Contact Aboriginal Custodianship ===
The land on which the huge former Australian Agricultural Company (AACo) pastoral station, Warrah Station was established was part of the traditional lands of the Kamilaroi people who cared for the land and sustained themselves hunting the birds, insects and animals of the plains and gathering and processing vegetables. There were strong trade and ceremonial ties with the Wonnarua Aboriginal people whose main country lay in the inland regions of the Hunter and Upper Hunter Valley.

The Kamilaroi were a large nation of Aboriginal people extending from the Upper Hunter through to the Warrumbungle Mountains in the west and to the lower reaches of south west Queensland. This nation was made up of many smaller family groups who shared the Gamilaraay language.

The Kamilaroi had a reputation as fierce warriors who defended their familial hunting grounds from other intruding bands and who also actively resisted European settlement for many years. One source noted that more than 500 Aboriginal and 15 Europeans were killed between 1832 and 1838 as European fortune hunters flooded into the Upper Hunter and Liverpool Plains area to settle.

=== Exploration and settlement ===
The opening up of the Upper Hunter and Liverpool Plains area was facilitated in the first instance by explorers Benjamin Singleton and John Howe in 1818 and again in 1821. In this later journey Howe reached as far as the current location of Maitland which he appraised as being good sheep country. In 1824 it was Henry Dangar who reached land to the west of Murrurundi in search of new grazing land. The next ten years saw an influx of hundreds of settlers to take up Crown lands grants in the Valley and Plains beyond.

Despite the Aboriginal resistance to this invasion, sometimes characterised as "a state of warfare", pressure from Europeans settling on and restricting access to land and its resources and the appalling effects of western disease on the indigenous peoples, resulted in their complete dispossession from their traditional land. By the mid to late 19th Century many Aboriginal people in the area had either accepted European life and settled in villages and towns or, perhaps more commonly, found residence on government reserves in the area such as Caroona near Quirindi or at St Clair reserve (later, 1905 St Clair Mission) between Singleton and Carrowbrook. The reserves allowed Aboriginal people to survive by farming and also using traditional hunting and gathering skills.

=== The Australian Agricultural Company ===
The Australian Agricultural Company (AACo) was formed under an act of British Parliament in 1824 as a result of the recommendations of Commissioner Bigge. Bigge recommended that private investment and enterprise, possibly in the growing of fine wool, was a crucial measure in the viable future of the Colony of NSW. Working capital of A£1 million was recommended to be granted as was the promise of a Crown Grant of four hundred thousand hectares (one million acres).

A group of potential investors headed by John Macarthur (son of John Macarthur of the notorious NSW Corps) soon formed and in June 1824 the AACo was enacted in Parliament. By November 1824, a Royal Charter was issued and agents appointed in the colony to act on behalf of the company. These were James Macarthur, H. H. Macarthur and James Bowman, later husband to Miss Macarthur. Survey General John Oxley was consulted on the possible location of land suitable for growing fine wool. After rejecting his suggestions of land in the Liverpool Plains, Upper Hunter, Bathurst and Upper Hastings River on the grounds these areas were either too far from the coast and transportation, or too densely settled, land at Port Stephens was chosen and the company began to establish itself there by 1826.

In the first years of its operation the AACo struggled to establish its ambitious enterprise and this was not helped by the fact that the land at Port Stephens was not particularly suitable for raising sheep. It was not until after 1829 when Sir Edward Parry was appointed commissioner of the company that the search for suitable fine wool growing land began in earnest and Parry proposed a swap of land at Port Stephens for another more appropriate tract of land. In 1831 on the advice of surveyor Henry Dangar, Parry made the decision to select two large runs at Warrah Creek and Goonoo Goonoo which were considered favourable for raising fine-wool sheep. Finally in 1833, after the initial rejection of the scheme by Governor Bourke and then the insistence of the Colonial Office in London, two grants of 9,700 hectares (24,000 acres) (Warrah) and 150 hectares (360 acres) (Goonoo Goonoo) were made to the AACo.

=== East Warrah Station ===
Development of the pastoral lands at Warrah was slow due to the shortage of available water on the run and the downturn in the demand for wool during the 1840s. In fact the company's aim to establish a leading fine wool growing enterprise in the colony was sidelined by the fact that the AACo put most of its energy and resources into its profitable coal mining enterprises. It was not until the company came under the management of a new commissioner, Mr Hodgson, that it refocused on developing its fine wool growing enterprise and in 1862 received an allocation of A£30,000 to develop sheep breeding and shearing facilities at Warrah which had been chosen for development as the AACo's head station for its wool production enterprise in the colony.

The Stock Superintendent, Samual Craik designed the new woolshed to be constructed at East Warrah in 1863. It was completed in time for shearing the property's new flock of 13,799 sheep in 1864. In that year also further investments were made in increasing the flock. The new sheep were pastured at West Warrah and an overseer was stationed at Windy Point (The Newcastle Chronicle and Hunter River District News 21 October 1865). The flock size continued to increase with a total of 84,719 sheep shorn at Warrah in 1870.{{rp}|256-259}} This number steadily increased through the 1870s and in 1875 there were a total flock of 110,000 sheep on the whole run, 92,413 of which were shorn in the Warrah woolshed in 1875.

Warrah woolshed began as a blade shearing shed. During the 1880s the race to develop a successful mechanised shearing system was reaching a peak. At this time the AACo bought into the debate, offering both Frederick Wolseley and rival inventor, John Suckling the opportunity to install 25 machines each. As Wolseley declined the offer, the shed was fitted with 50 of John Suckling's air compression-driven shears which in the course of time failed and the shed returned to blade shearing. Nevertheless, the experiment marked Warrah Woolshed as one of the first mechanised sheds in NSW and Australia (Newcastle Morning Herald and Miners Advocate 9 June 1888).Wolseley's successful shears were first installed at Dunlop Station on the Darling River and at Toganmain on the Murrumbidgee near Hay.

Warrah Station continued to increase its productivity in the 1890s with 159,000 sheep shorn at Warrah in 1896.The woolshed had expanded to include 64 stands and had been fitted out with a hydraulic dump and press capable of baling 60 bales of wool per day. The extended woolshed could now hold 6000 sheep.

Associated with the woolshed from soon after its construction in 1863 is the bake house which still stands and adjacent barrack accommodation for shearers which no longer exists. The core of the station's earliest homestead and associated buildings lies in ruins on the adjacent property – Warrah Ridge which was subdivided and sold off early in the 20th century. In the 1890s a new homestead and associated buildings was established around the East Warrah woolshed. These buildings included a school house (1889), a meat house and store, stables and cart shed (1891) several staff cottages and the new Warrah homestead (1896).

The focus of activity on the large Warrah station began to change at the turn of the 20th century when work began on the design and construction of a large and handsome woolshed at Windy Station in 1901.

The pressure for closer settlement brought to bear on Warrah Station at the turn of the 20th century and the eastern part of the run around Willow Tree was subdivided in 1908. A further government resumption of 45,000 acres occurred and was sold in 1911 and still further subdivision and sales of east Warrah occurred in 1914, 1935 and 1967 resulting in the gradual withdrawal of the company from Warrah station to other properties. In 1969 the Warrah homestead was sold and the company interests in the area comprised about 33,000 acres on Windy Station in the north west corner of the original grant. Romani Pastoral Company purchased East Warrah Station in 1999. Cattle are currently run on Warrah Station.

== Description ==
East Warrah Woolshed is a large 1864 woolshed constructed of timber cut from the property. The original building consists of a number of large catching pens at the north of the building. South of this runs two shearing boards and the southernmost part of the building is the large wool room. The sweating sheds and wool room are set on huge bed logs.

The roof of the shearing boards and wool room originally featured by a double gable roof covered with locally split shingles. The shingles were replaced with corrugated iron prior to the 1890s. The wool room roof was converted to a very large single gable structure sometime after 1900.

In 1896 an additional two wings of sweating pens were added to the north eastern side of the original woolshed. The sweating pens were constructed using sawn timber. The 1890s sweating pens are connected to the original woolshed by a long sheep bridge.

=== Condition ===
As of 8 October 2014, The building is in generally good condition. The site has moderate archaeological potential. Despite modifications to the original sweating pens, western shearing board and wool room the Warrah Woolshed maintains a relatively high degree of integrity as do the other historic buildings in the precinct.

=== Modifications and dates ===
- Mechanisation of the shearing board - 1886
- Removal of machine shears - c. 1888
- Covering of shingle roof with corrugated iron - 1894
- Erection of extended sweating pens and reconstruction of the wool room roof - c. 1894
- Fabrication of high gable over the catching pens - prior to 1941
- Modification of the wool room to create a bull sale pen - c. 1990
- Removal of some floor section sin the original sweating pens and western board

== Heritage listing ==
East Warrah Woolshed is of state heritage significance as the working heart of the first head station established by the AACo, the first private enterprise in the colony charged with the establishment of the fine wool industry in NSW. The management of the enterprise, its core business of sheep growing and fine wool production is clearly demonstrated through the layout of the woolshed. The considerable achievements of the AACo in the development of the industry are also demonstrated in the size and fabric of the woolshed. It is also one of the largest woolsheds in NSW established before the 1870s.

The state significance of the item is enhanced through its association with the AACo and its achievements, the first private enterprise to engage in fine wool growing in NSW. There are numerous personal associations with noted figures who managed and developed the company.

In addition the state heritage significance of the woolshed is demonstrated in its great potential to provide information on the operation of a large pastoral head station and technical developments in the fine wool industry.

It has state significant rarity values as a rare example of a woolshed associated with the AACo. The woolshed is a rare example of a large woolshed built in the 1860s and is likely the oldest woolshed of that decade. In addition the woolshed is representative of the work of large pastoral stations in the mid to late 19th century. (The State Heritage Inventory provides information about heritage items listed by local and State government agencies. The State Heritage Inventory is continually being updated by local and State agencies as new information becomes available and there is a copyright and disclaimer.)

East Warrah Woolshed was listed on the New South Wales State Heritage Register on 10 August 2018 having satisfied the following criteria.

The place is important in demonstrating the course, or pattern, of cultural or natural history in New South Wales.

East Warrah Woolshed is likely to be of state heritage significance as the working heart of the first head pastoral station established by the AACo, the first private enterprise in the colony charged with the establishment of the fine wool industry in NSW. The woolshed contains the evidence of the scale of the pastoral enterprise in the industry and clearly demonstrates the size and intensity of the primary production activity of the station - the growing of sheep for the production of fine wool.

East Warrah Woolshed is one of the few very large woolsheds (it initially contained 30 stands and when later extended, 64 stands), still intact today, to be constructed prior to the 1870s after which time surviving sheds are more numerous. In addition, the East Warrah Woolshed was one of the first woolsheds in NSW to take up mechanised shearing. Although the Suckling system was not entirely successful, its trial at East Warrah contributed to the development of that technology.

The place has a strong or special association with a person, or group of persons, of importance of cultural or natural history of New South Wales's history.

The East Warrah Station Woolshed's state heritage significance may be enhanced through its direct associations with the AACo and its objective of developing a fine wool industry in NSW. It also has associations numerous pioneering AACo officials such as Company Superintendent E. C. Merewether and the company's first Stock Superintendent, Samual Craik.

The place is important in demonstrating aesthetic characteristics and/or a high degree of creative or technical achievement in New South Wales.

East Warrah Woolshed has local heritage significance for its aesthetic values. The woolshed is a fine example of a vernacular style woolshed constructed in the 1860s.

The place has potential to yield information that will contribute to an understanding of the cultural or natural history of New South Wales.

The East Warrah Woolshed may be of state heritage significance for it has the potential to demonstrate the development and operation of a large pastoral head station during the mid to late 19th and 20th centuries.

East Warrah Woolshed is likely to be of state heritage significance for its important role in the development of the Australian wool industry and the heritage fabric provides important information on the developments in this industry. The shed was constructed from timber logged on the property and the form of the shed demonstrates the type of rectangular lineal workflow sheds being constructed prior to the advent of the T-shaped woolshed of the 1870s. Additionally, in 1886, the shed hosted a trial the Suckling Patent compressed air shearing system. The failure of this system at East Warrah helped secure the Wolseley Patent shearing system as the preferred option for woolshed across NSW and beyond.

The place possesses uncommon, rare or endangered aspects of the cultural or natural history of New South Wales.

East Warrah Woolshed may be a rare example of a large woolshed on runs beyond the limits of location in the 1860s and is likely to be the oldest surviving woolshed from this decade.

The place is important in demonstrating the principal characteristics of a class of cultural or natural places/environments in New South Wales.

The item may be of state heritage significance as a fine example of a woolshed dating from the mid to late 19th century in NSW. It is also representative of the substantial investment into fine wool growing undertaken by the Australian Agricultural Company from 1862.

== See also ==
- Agriculture in Australia
- Windy Station Woolshed
