= William Nowland =

William Nowland (September 1804 – April 28, 1884) was the son of Second Fleet convicts Michael Nowland and Elizabeth Richards. Born in Castlehill in September 1804. He had received 160 acres of land in the Singleton area. He helped established in village of Camberwell in the 1860s. He established a 1500-acre property called Rosedale which he purchased allotments to build shops, Falbrook public school and the Queen Victoria Hotel. He also owned the property 'Warrah' until the Australian Agricultural Company took it in 1832. The discoverer of Nowlands Gap, the "gateway" to the Liverpool Plains and first road into the Hunter Valley. He died on April 28, 1884, and was buried at St Clements church ground. His body laid to rest near Singleton, New South Wales. His headstone is huge and reads; "Earth to earth, Dust to Dust. Calmly now the words we say. Leaving him to sleep in trust. Till the Resurrection-day. Father, in thy gracious keeping, leave we now thy servant sleeping."
