= La Belle Station =

Pastoral lease in the Northern Territory

Coordinates: 13.11372°S 130.49363°E

Location in Northern Territory

La Belle Station, also known as Labelle Downs, is a pastoral lease that operates as a cattle station in the Northern Territory of Australia.

The property is situated approximately 59 kilometres (37 mi) west of Batchelor and 85 kilometres (53 mi) south of Darwin. La Belle shares its eastern boundary with Litchfield National Park, Litchfield Station is to the south, the Delissaville-Wagait-Larrakia Aboriginal Land Trust is to the north, and the Timor Sea is to the west.

The property is composed of many land types. About one third is red dirt and sandy forest, of which about half has been cleared with some being converted to humidicola pasture. The remainder is highly productive marine floodplain covered in native wetland grasses such as hymenachne, rice grass, marine couch and cane grass, along with introduced grasses. Divided into 34 paddocks, it has an estimated carrying capacity of 14,000 head of cattle.

Originally a part of neighbouring Stapleton Station, La Belle was taken up by the Townsend family in 1962. In 2001, the 610-square-kilometre (236 sq mi) property was placed on the market by the Townsend family partnership. It was stocked with 10,500 head of Brahman cattle.

La Belle, along with Welltree Station, was sold by Peter Camm in 2008 for A$72 million, during a land boom.

R. M. Williams Agricultural Holdings acquired the property, which it held until 2013 when the company went into receivership. Both La Belle and Welltree were then sold to the Australian Agricultural Company for A$27.1 million.

== See also ==
- List of ranches and stations
