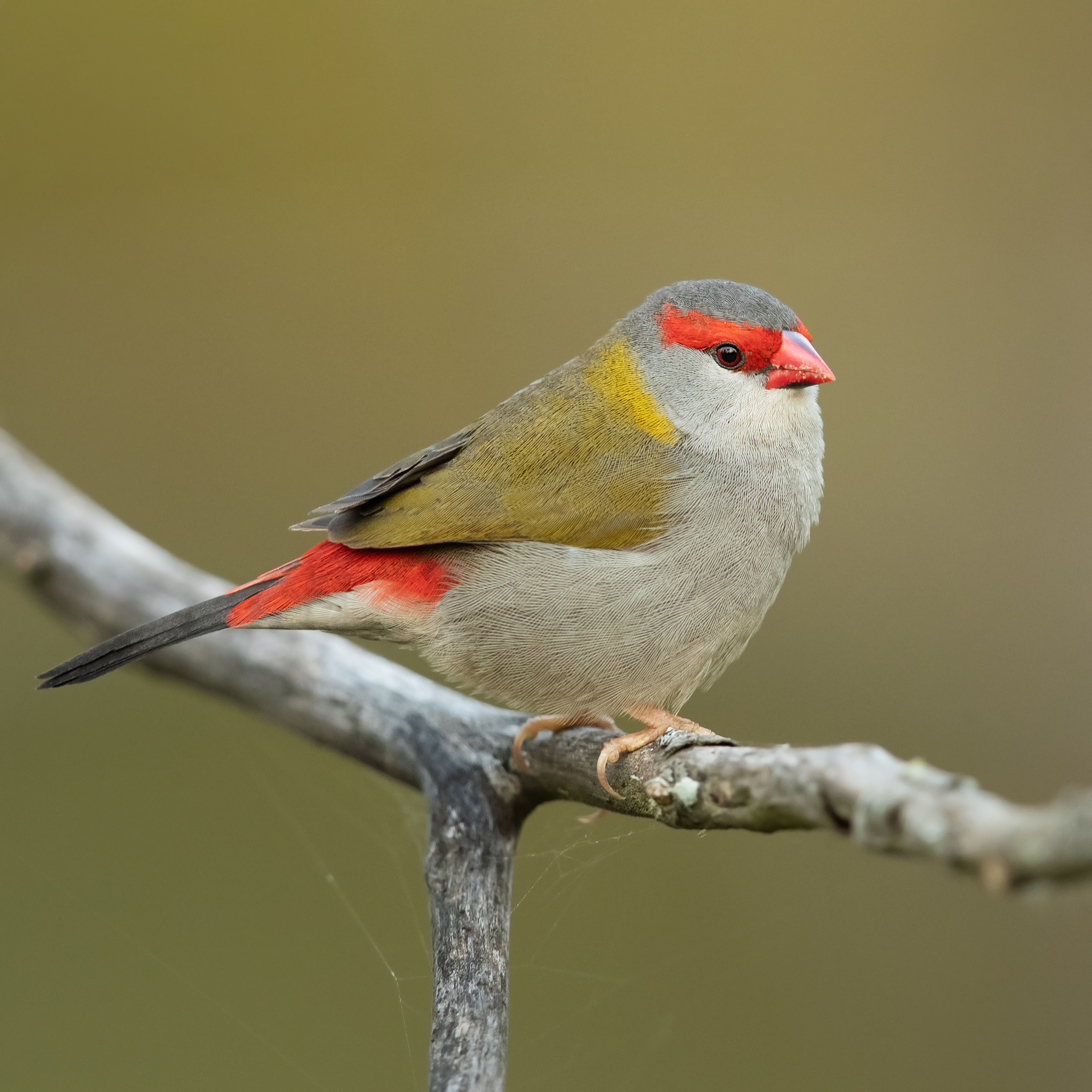

Conservation status
- Least Concern (IUCN 3.1)

Scientific classification
- Kingdom: Animalia
- Phylum: Chordata
- Class: Aves
- Order: Passeriformes
- Family: Estrildidae
- Genus: Neochmia
- Species: N. temporalis

Binomial name
- Neochmia temporalis (Latham, 1801)
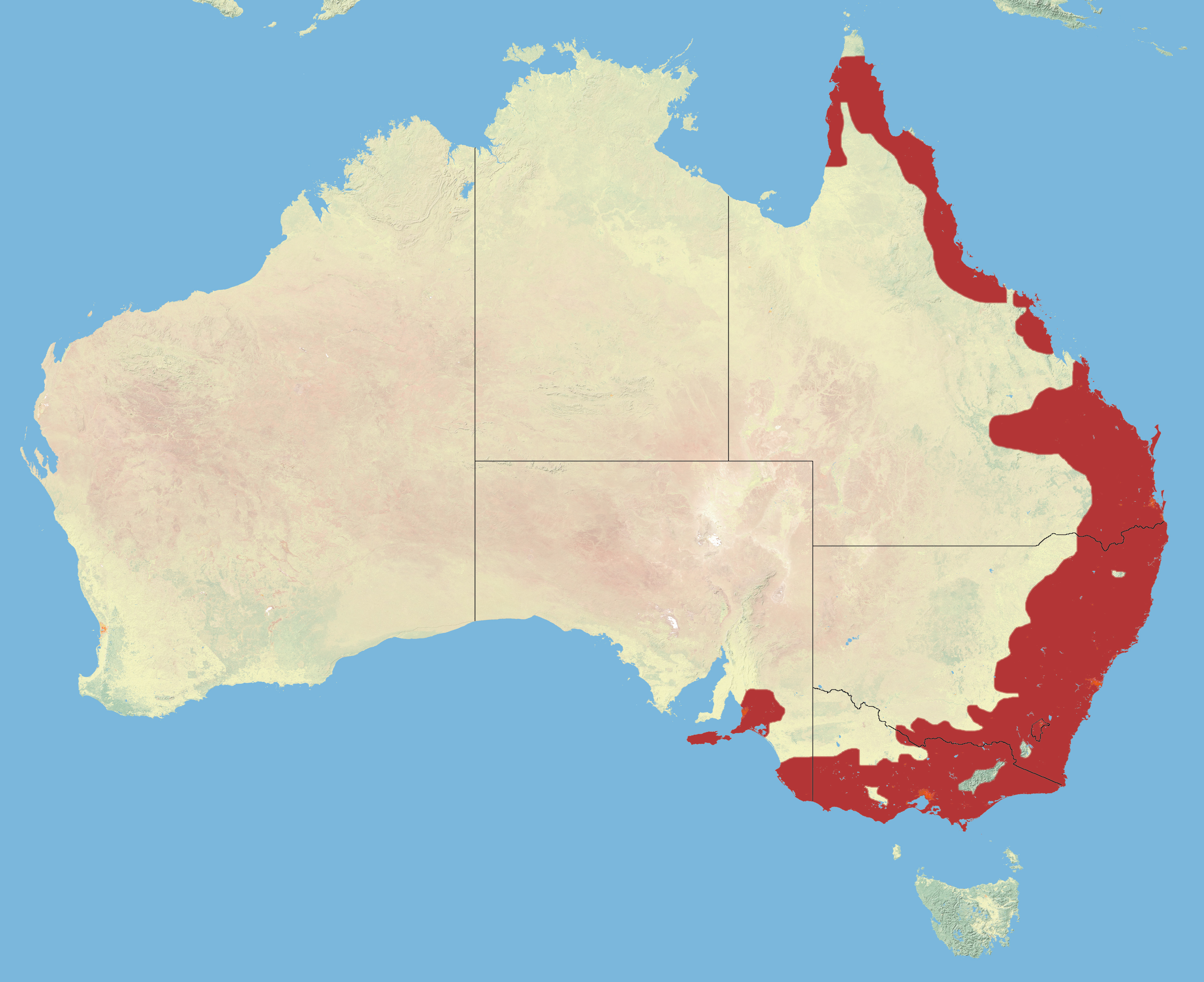
- Approximate distribution in red

= Red-browed finch =

Species of bird

The red-browed finch (Neochmia temporalis) is an estrildid finch native to the east coast of Australia. This species has established introduced populations near Perth and in the Darling Ranges, and is also feral in French Polynesia. It is commonly found in temperate forest and dry savannah habitats. It may also be found in dry forest and mangrove habitats in tropical regions.

The species is distinguished by the bright red stripe above the eye and bright red rump. The rest of the body is grey, with olive wing coverts and collar. Juveniles do not have red brow marks and lack olive colouration on the collar and wing coverts. The adults are 11–12 cm (4.3–4.7 in) long.

== Taxonomy ==
The red-browed finch was first described by the English ornithologist John Latham in 1801 under the binomial name Fringilla temporalis. It is one of four species in the genus Neochmia. Alternate names include red-browed firetail, Sydney waxbill and redbill.

The species was once allied to genus Emblema. There are three noted subspecies: the nominate species N. temporalis temporalis, in most of the east coast, and inland New South Wales and Victoria; N. temporalis minor, which is distinguished by a white breast, in northern New South Wales, and south-east of Australia, and N. temporalis loftyi in the south west corner of South Australia, although the latter is sometimes not listed as a subspecies, as the differences between it and the type species are relatively minor.

== Conservation status ==
The finch is common in the south east of its range, from Brisbane to Melbourne. Subspecies N. t. minor is common between Cooktown and Townsville. The species is listed as being of least concern on the IUCN Red List. There are no key threatening processes for N. temporalis, although the Pest Animal Control CRC suggests that the introduced nutmeg mannikin (Lonchura punctulata), which currently threatens some native mannikins through increased competition, maybe a minor threat to N. lateralis in northern Queensland.

In regional areas, the species needs adequate shrub density to provide cover and foraging places. The species has been noted to decline or even disappear in areas that have been cleared or grazed, especially in combination with drought.

== Biology and ecology ==
The red-browed finch is highly sociable and is usually seen in small flocks of 10 to 20 individuals. Flocks are sedentary or nomadic in their local area. Flocks prefer semi-open woodland, especially edges of forests, where brushy scrub meets cleared areas, especially near creeks.

The finch makes short, piping high-pitched cheeps. When disturbed, the whole flock will disperse, cheeping, and re-congregate nearby.

N. temporalis is a seed eater, living mostly on grass and sedge seed, but will happily feed on many non-native seeds. Wild birds will even enter large-mesh aviaries in suburban areas to eat seed, given the opportunity.

The red-browed finch builds a large domed nest with a side entrance, woven from grass and small twigs. Nests are usually built 2–3 metres (6.6–9.8 ft) above the ground in dense shrubs. Nesting is communal. Both parents share nest building, incubation of the eggs, and feed the young together. Four to six white eggs are laid per clutch two or three times per year, between October and April. Juveniles are fully independent within 28 days.

Red-browed finches are common aviary birds. The red-browed finch will sometimes hybridise with the star finch, crimson finch, and zebra finch if kept together in captivity. The species has been introduced to southwest Australia, where it is sometimes confused with the red-eared firetail Stagonopleura oculata.

== Gallery ==
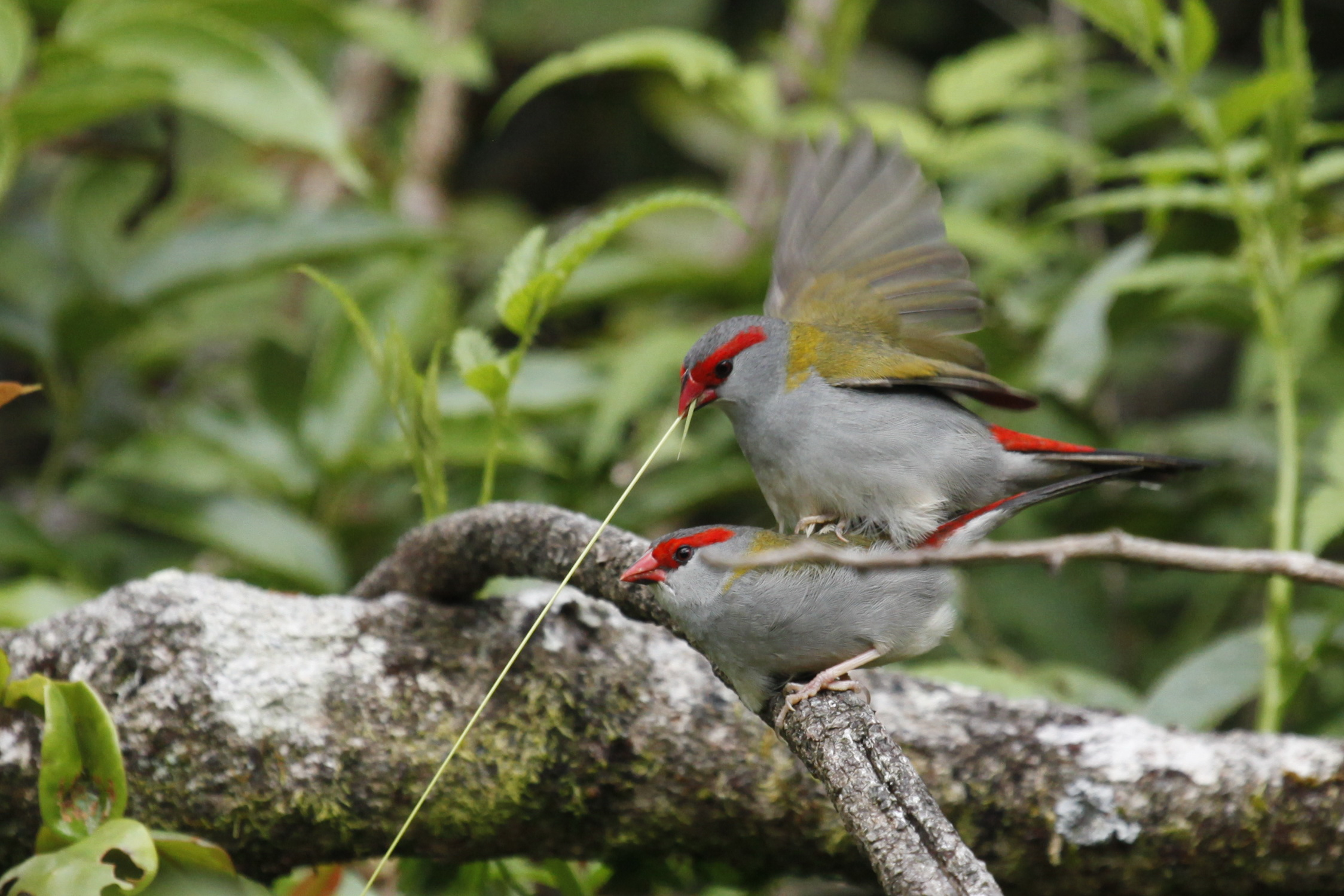
Mating; male with display stalk

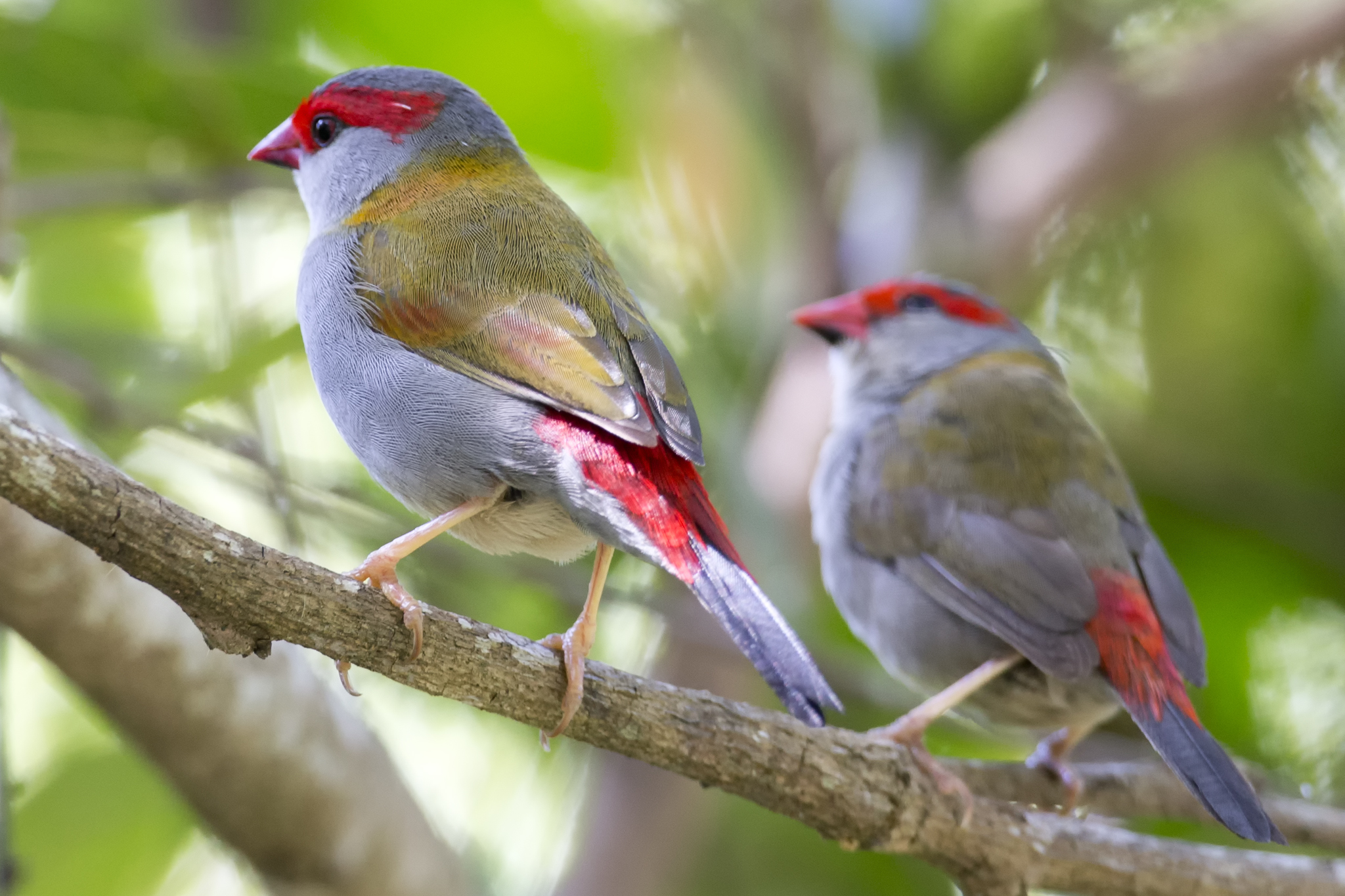
Red-browed finch, North Queensland
