= Welltree =

Pastoral lease in the Northern Territory

Coordinates: 13.206°S 130.534°E

Location in Northern Territory

Welltree Station is a pastoral lease that operates as a cattle station in Northern Territory.

== Location ==
The property is situated in the locality of Rakula approximately 57 kilometres (35 mi) west of Batchelor and 90 kilometres (56 mi) south west of Darwin. It is located adjacent to Litchfield National Park. Part of the Anson Bay, Daly and Reynolds River Floodplains, an Important Bird and Biodiversity Area is found within the station boundaries.

== History ==
In 1961 Welltree was bought by Bob Townshend for A$9 million. He put the property on the market in 2001 when it was stocked with 9,000 head of Brahman cattle and comprised 391 square kilometres (151 sq mi), of which 60 percent is made up of floodplain country. The floodplain supports a mixture of olive hymenachne, para and rice grasses. The higher country has been planted with various grasses and legumes. The property has been divided into 29 separate paddocks which are well watered by two large permanent lagoons and six bores.

R. M. Williams Agricultural holdings acquired both Labelle Downs and Welltree aggregation at the top of the market in 2009 from cattleman Peter Camm in 2009. The company went into receivership in 2013 with PPB Advisory being appointed as the receiver and manager of all the properties in the companies portfolio.

R. M. Williams Agricultural holdings sold the property, along with Labelle Downs, to Australian Agricultural Company in 2013 for A$27 million.

== See also ==
- List of ranches and stations
