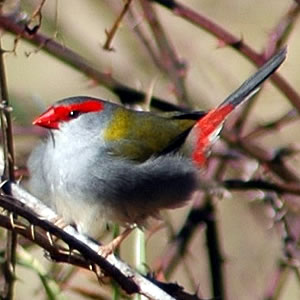
- Red-browed finch (Neochmia temporalis)

Scientific classification
- Kingdom: Animalia
- Phylum: Chordata
- Class: Aves
- Order: Passeriformes
- Family: Estrildidae
- Genus: Neochmia; G.R. Gray, 1849

Type species
- Fringilla phaeton Hombron & Jacquinot, 1841

Species
- N. temporalis N. phaeton

= Neochmia =

Genus of birds

Neochmia is a genus of estrildid finches found in Australasia. They are gregarious seed-eaters with short, thick, but pointed bills.

== Taxonomy ==
The genus Neochmia was introduced in 1849 by the English zoologist George Gray with Fringilla phaeton Hombron & Jacquinot, the crimson finch as the type species. The genus name is from Ancient Greek νεοχμια/neokhmia meaning "innovation" or "phenomenon".

The genus contains two species:

Image	Scientific name	Common name	Distribution
	Red-browed finch	Neochmia temporalis	Northern Queensland, and south-east of Australia
	Crimson finch	Neochmia phaeton	Northern Australia with some residing in New Guinea
