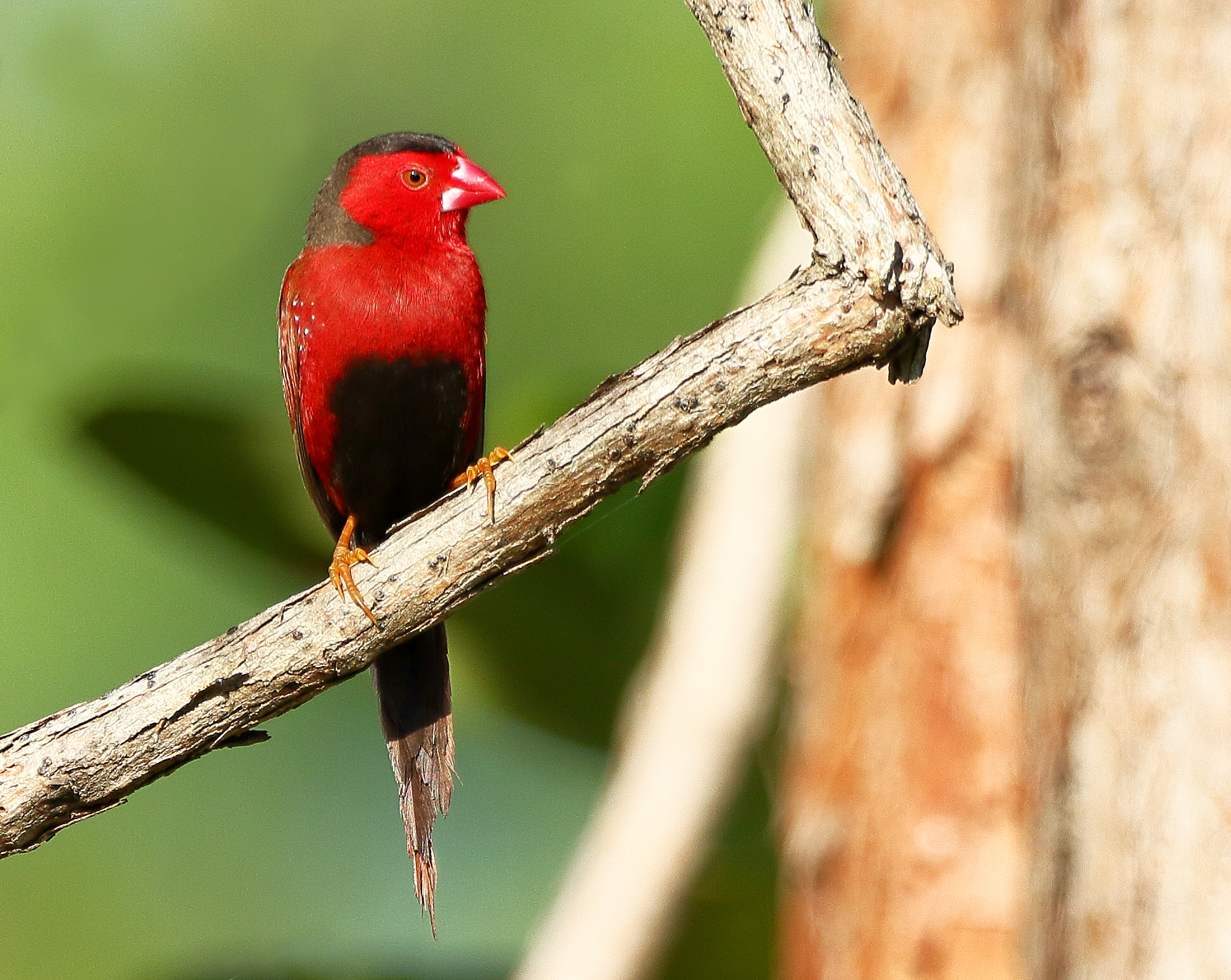

Conservation status
- Least Concern (IUCN 3.1)

Scientific classification
- Kingdom: Animalia
- Phylum: Chordata
- Class: Aves
- Order: Passeriformes
- Family: Estrildidae
- Genus: Neochmia
- Species: N. phaeton

Binomial name
- Neochmia phaeton (Hombron & Jacquinot, 1841)

Synonyms
- Fringilla phaeton

= Crimson finch =

Species of bird

The crimson finch (Neochmia phaeton) is a species of bird in the family Estrildidae. It is found throughout Northern Australia as well as parts of southern New Guinea. Crimson finches feature a distinctively bright crimson coat and are known for their aggression.

== Taxonomy and systematics ==
Hombron and Jacquinot first observed crimson finches at Raffles Bay in northern Australia in 1841. Its protonym is Fringilla phaeton.

"Crimson finch" has been designated as the official common name for the species by the International Ornithologists' Union (IOC). Alternate names include "blood finch" and "killer finch", derived from its tendency for aggressive behavior towards other red birds.

The crimson finch belongs to the family Estrildidae. Two subspecies are recognised: the black-bellied crimson finch (Neochmia p. phaeton) and its white-bellied counterpart (Neochmia p. evangelinae). A related species is the star finch (Neochmia ruficauda). It also bears resemblance to birds of the genus Lagonosticta (firefinches), to which it is closely related. Common physical characteristics between crimson finches and firefinches include a red head and bright crimson coat.

== Description ==
The crimson finch is a relatively small-sized bird. It is about 13 cm in length and weighs just 13g (0.46 oz). Standout features include a bright crimson color, long tail, and white specks that run across the sides of its body. There are also shades of grey around the neck area. This species is sexually dimorphic as the females are slightly paler in color. However, the same plumage is observed for both sexes.

A difference between males and females is that males have longer tails and bills. In addition, they are larger and heavier. Three weeks after fledging, crimson finches moult into adult plumage. The moult is only partial as juvenile greater primary coverts are preserved.

== Distribution and habitat ==
Crimson finches are mainly distributed across Northern Australia with some residing in New Guinea. They are common in the Kimberley (Northwest) region but less widespread in the Queensland (Northeast) area.

Crimson finches' preferred habitats are areas with tall, dense grasses. They typically reside near wetlands (riparian vegetation) that have an abundance of Pandanus trees. For nesting, they utilize shrubs and dry brush to establish nests at the base of these trees. Nests are also commonly established within hollow tree limbs.

== Behavior and ecology ==
Crimson finches are renowned for their aggressive behavior; hence the nicknames "blood finch" and "killer finch". Males are aggressive towards birds of the same species as well as different species. In any case, there is no consideration of age, coloration, or body size. Aggressive encounters are largely held on an individual basis and thus vary. Female crimson finches also exhibit similar aggressive behavior towards intruders if they are the primary defenders of a nest. However, little is known about female aggression.

For breeding, crimson finches' primary mating system is monogamy. There are about 4 to 5 breeding pairs per 100 metres (330 ft). They are known to be non-territorial and establish nests in close proximity to other birds' nests. They primarily nest in areas that are centrally located to riparian vegetation and rivers. Unlike other southern passerines that lay small clutches, crimson finches have extremely large clutch sizes. This deviance could be explained by high rates of nest predation by reptiles, which use their olfactory sense to find nests.

For feeding, crimson finches primarily feed on seeds of grasses. One example is Xerochloa imberbis, a type of rice grass. They also feed on insects.

Crimson finches have high survival rates (70-96%). They can live up to 5 years and beyond.

== Relationship to humans ==
Crimson finches are not limited to their wild habitats. They can also be purchased and raised as pet birds. However, they are costly. A pair can cost anywhere from $600 to $800. Black-bellied crimson finches have a "bad reputation" in terms of general ownership and care. Moreover, its aggressive behavior is evident when confined to a small space. Captive males are said to be more aggressive relative to their wild counterparts. Crimson finches are not common in aviculture based on data collected within the past twenty years.

== Conservation status ==
According to the IUCN Red List, the crimson finch is classified as "least concern" The current population is stable and doesn't see any substantial threats. However, their habitat has been vulnerable due to floods caused by dam construction. Despite this, they have adapted and have yet to encounter any significant problems as indicated by their unaffected nesting and breeding success.

== Gallery ==
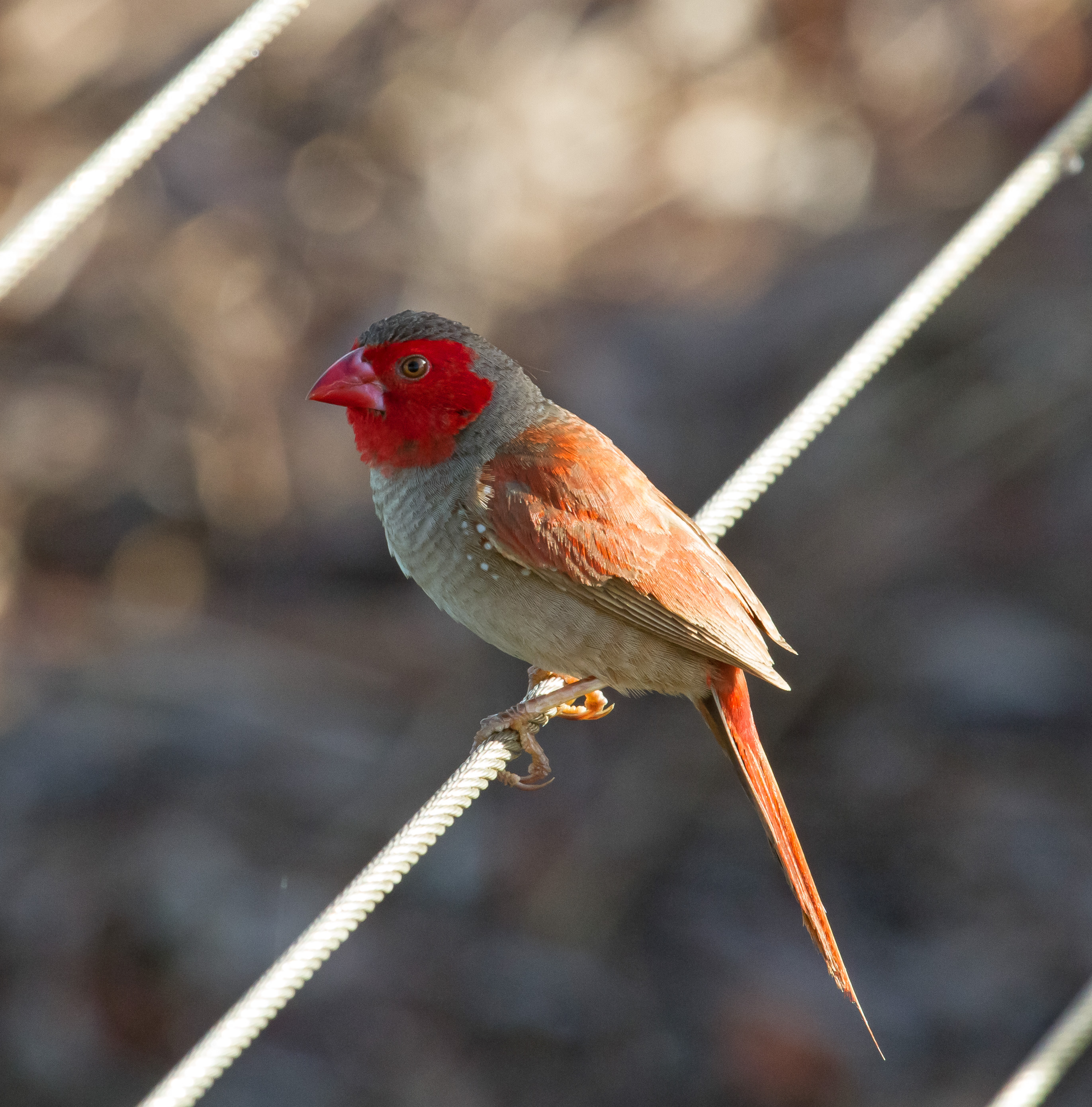
Female Crimson Finch

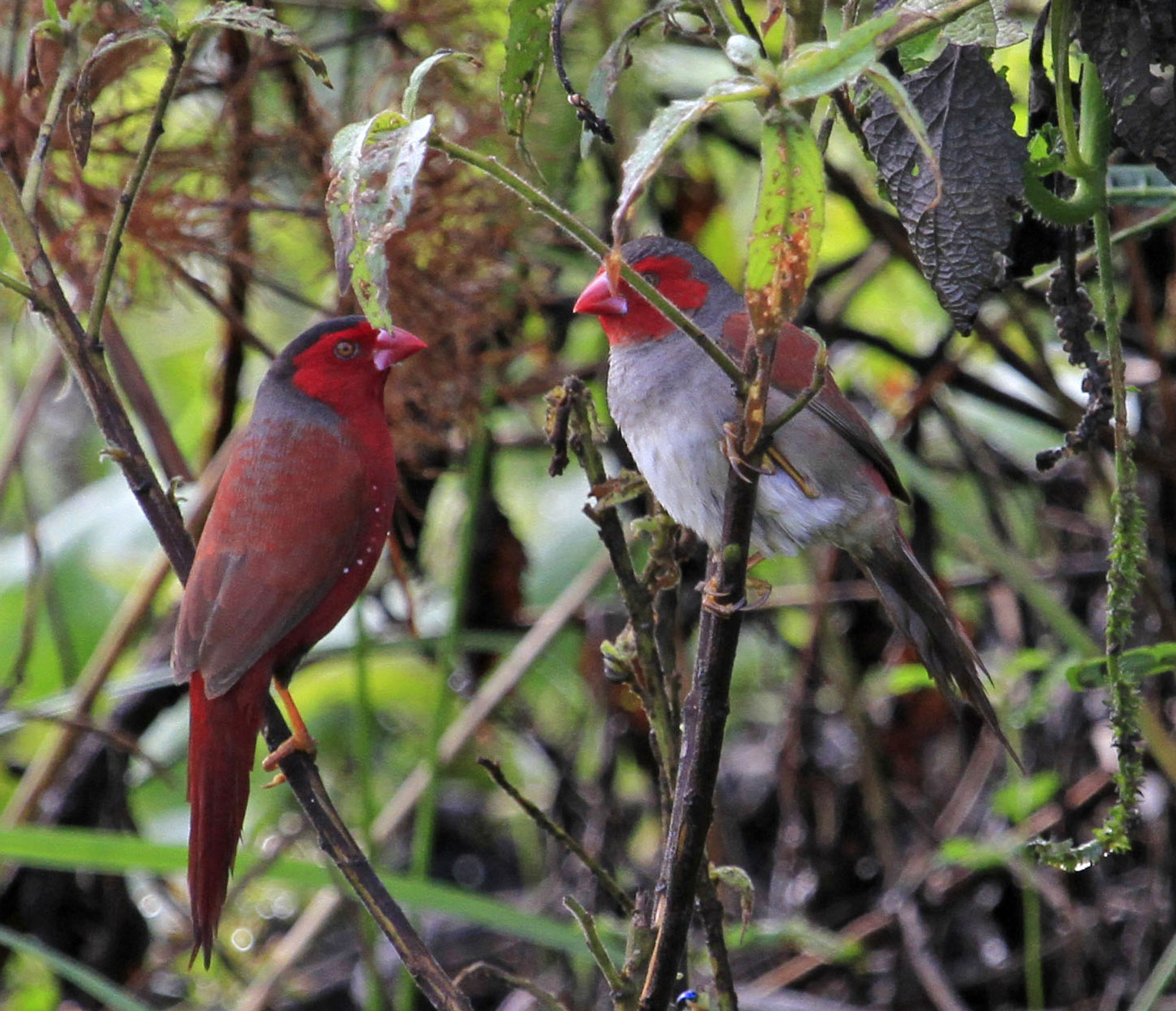
Breeding Pair

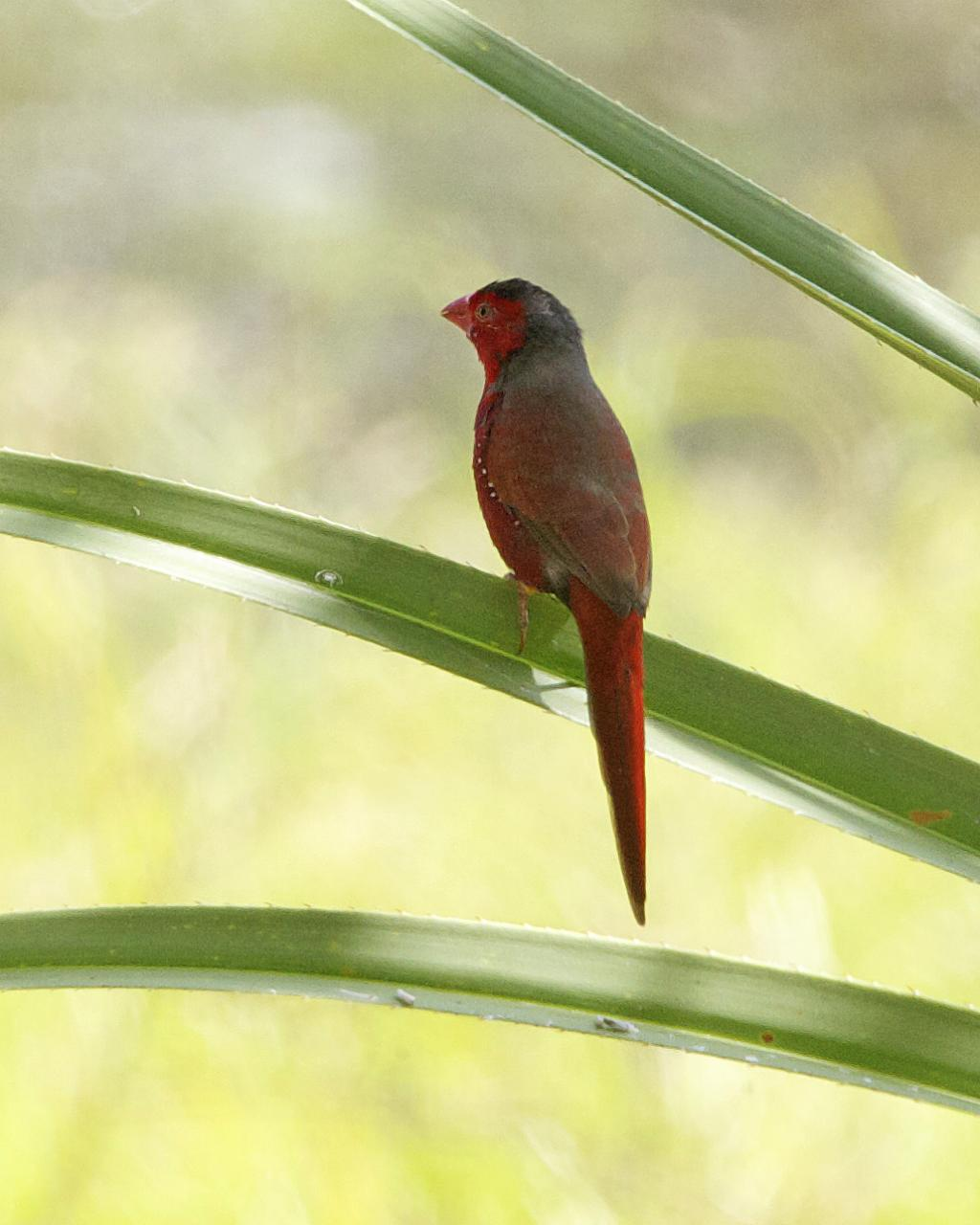

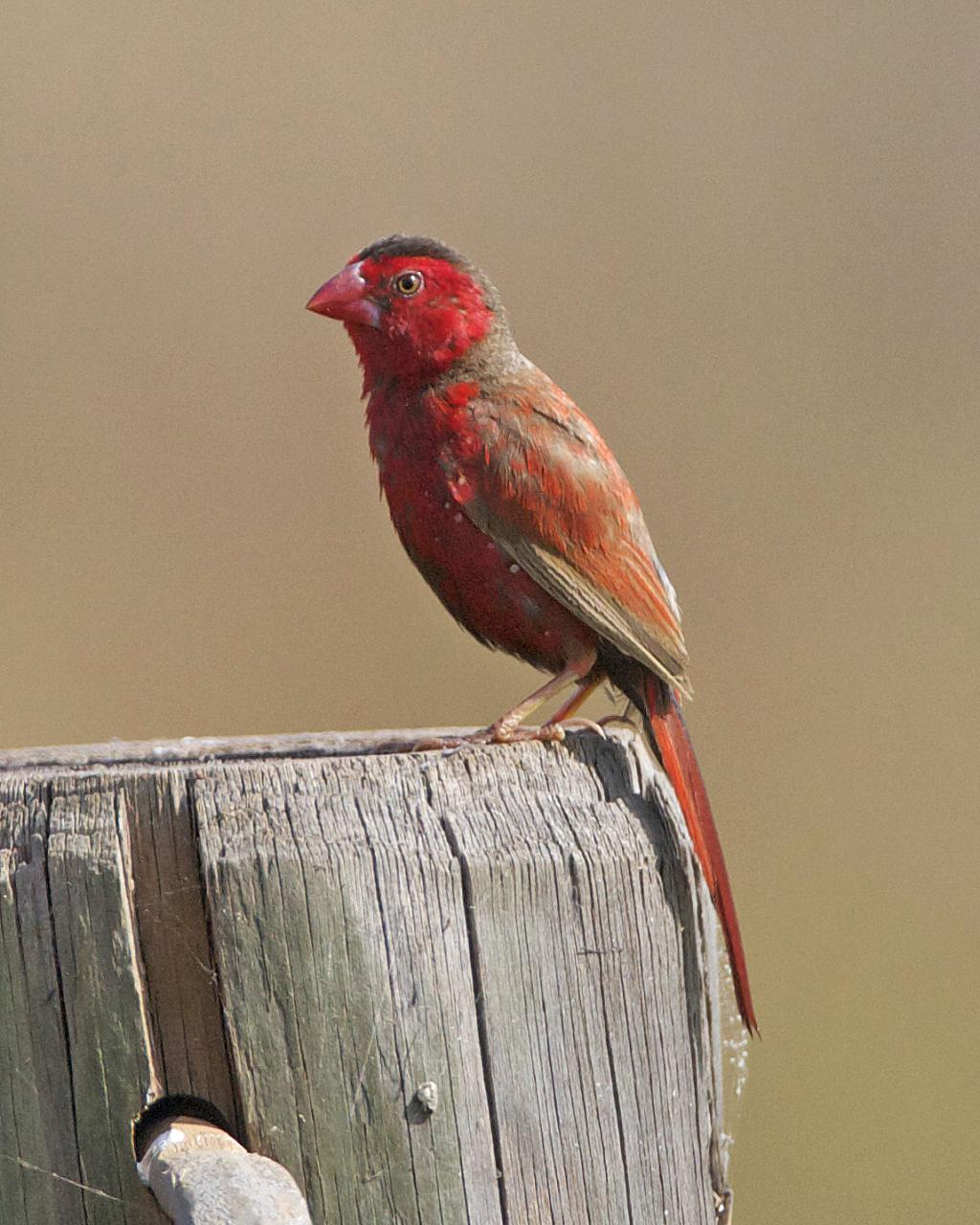
