= Xerochloa =

Scientific classification
- Kingdom: Plantae
- Clade: Tracheophytes
- Clade: Angiosperms
- Clade: Monocots
- Clade: Commelinids
- Order: Poales
- Family: Poaceae
- Subfamily: Panicoideae
- Supertribe: Panicodae
- Tribe: Paniceae
- Subtribe: Cenchrinae
- Genus: Xerochloa; R.Br.

Type species
- Xerochloa imberbis R.Br.

Synonyms
- Kerinozoma Steud.

Genus of grasses

Xerochloa is a genus of Australian and Southeast Asian plants in the grass family.

Species

- Xerochloa barbata R.Br. - Western Australia, Northern Territory, Queensland
- Xerochloa imberbis R.Br. - rice grass - Thailand, Java, Western Australia, Northern Territory, Queensland
- Xerochloa laniflora Benth. - Western Australia, Northern Territory, Queensland

formerly included

see Apluda

- Xerochloa latifolia - Apluda mutica
