= Warrah, New South Wales =

Locality in Buckland County, New South Wales, Australia

Coordinates: 31.6651°S 150.6854°E

Warrah is a locality on the Liverpool Plains of New South Wales in the County of Buckland. It is most well known for the Australian Agricultural Company (AA Co) estate, 'Warrah Estate', established when the AA Co was granted 249,600 acres in 1833.

The Gamilaraay people lived in the region for many thousands of years prior to white settlement. In 1826, squatter William Nowland moved to the area, after droving 100 head of cattle over the Dart Brook pass and east onto Warrah Creek.

In 1833, the Australian Agricultural Company was granted this land, after its original one million acres granted at Port Stephens proved unsuitable. Under manager William Telfer, Warrah was stocked with 700 pure Saxon Merinos moved up from the Port Stephens Estate. In February 1834 the Warrah flock was moved north again to the Company’s Peel Estate.

In 1861 Samuel Craik took over as Manager at Warrah and the Company began a more concerted development for sheep breeding and invested heavily in wells, bores, and fencing. The Warrah Estate was divided into two sections: East Warrah (122,600 acres) and West Warrah / Windy (127,000 acres).

In the 1870s, the town of Willow Tree was established after the opening of the Great Northern Railway from Murrurundi to Quirindi in 1877. A railway station was opened north of the Willow Tree Inn, originally named ‘Warrah’, but changed to ‘Willow Tree’ in 1879. A school opened nearby in 1881.
