= Nowlands Gap =

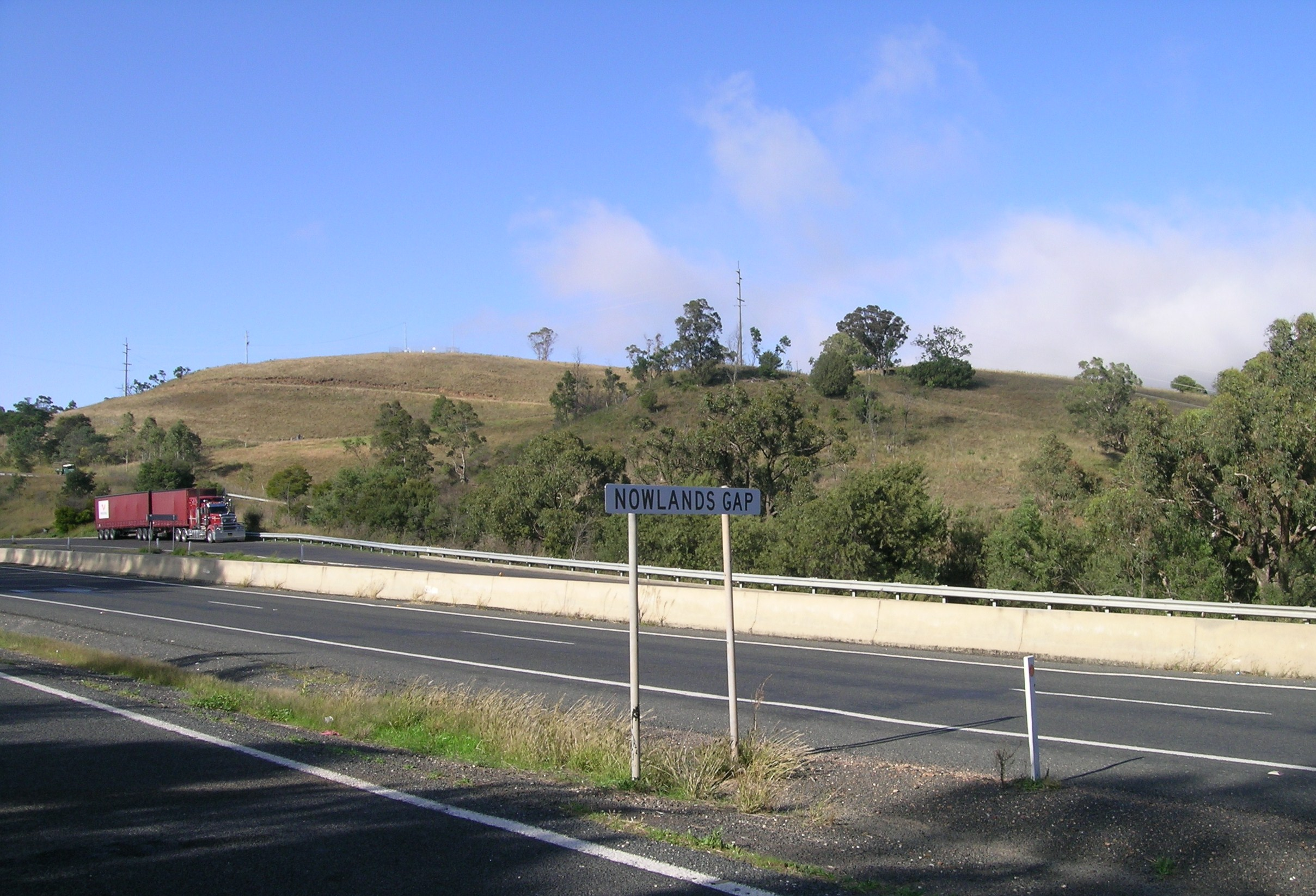
Nowlands Gap

Nowlands Gap, also known as Nowlands Pass and Murrurundi Gap, is a pass over the Liverpool Range, part of the Great Dividing Range, that provides access between the Hunter Valley and Northern Tablelands of New South Wales, Australia.

== Location and features ==
William Nowland, a farmer from Singleton (then known as Patrick's Plains), discovered Nowlands Gap north of Murrurundi in 1827. The pass is approximately 730 metres (2,400 ft) above sea level and is surrounded by high ground of over 1,200 metres (3,900 ft). The New England Highway carries vehicular traffic over the range, and the Main North railway line passes under the range via the Ardglen Tunnel.

The Bureau of Meteorology maintains a weather station at the pass, named Murrurundi Gap AWS.

=== Climate ===
Climate data for Murrurundi Gap AWS (2003–2022); 729 m AMSL; 31.74° S, 150.79° E
Month	Jan	Feb	Mar	Apr	May	Jun	Jul	Aug	Sep	Oct	Nov	Dec	Year
Record high °C (°F)	39.2 (102.6)	40.5 (104.9)	34.7 (94.5)	29.6 (85.3)	24.1 (75.4)	21.1 (70.0)	20.2 (68.4)	23.9 (75.0)	29.6 (85.3)	34.2 (93.6)	38.2 (100.8)	39.3 (102.7)	40.5 (104.9)
Mean daily maximum °C (°F)	28.5 (83.3)	27.1 (80.8)	24.3 (75.7)	20.9 (69.6)	16.7 (62.1)	12.9 (55.2)	12.5 (54.5)	14.6 (58.3)	18.3 (64.9)	21.6 (70.9)	24.3 (75.7)	26.6 (79.9)	20.7 (69.2)
Mean daily minimum °C (°F)	16.7 (62.1)	15.7 (60.3)	14.1 (57.4)	11.3 (52.3)	8.2 (46.8)	5.9 (42.6)	4.9 (40.8)	5.7 (42.3)	8.5 (47.3)	10.9 (51.6)	13.0 (55.4)	14.9 (58.8)	10.8 (51.5)
Record low °C (°F)	8.7 (47.7)	6.8 (44.2)	5.5 (41.9)	1.6 (34.9)	0.2 (32.4)	−1.9 (28.6)	−1.8 (28.8)	−2.1 (28.2)	0.4 (32.7)	1.8 (35.2)	3.7 (38.7)	5.7 (42.3)	−2.1 (28.2)
Average rainfall mm (inches)	66.6 (2.62)	70.3 (2.77)	79.2 (3.12)	32.2 (1.27)	36.4 (1.43)	65.2 (2.57)	48.5 (1.91)	42.0 (1.65)	47.4 (1.87)	56.8 (2.24)	85.2 (3.35)	86.8 (3.42)	720.9 (28.38)
Average rainy days (≥ 0.2mm)	8.6	8.5	10.2	8.6	9.2	13.4	11.4	8.5	7.3	9.2	9.8	10.6	115.3
Source: Bureau of Meteorology

== See also ==
- List of mountain passes
