= Willow Tree, New South Wales =

Willow Tree New South Wales
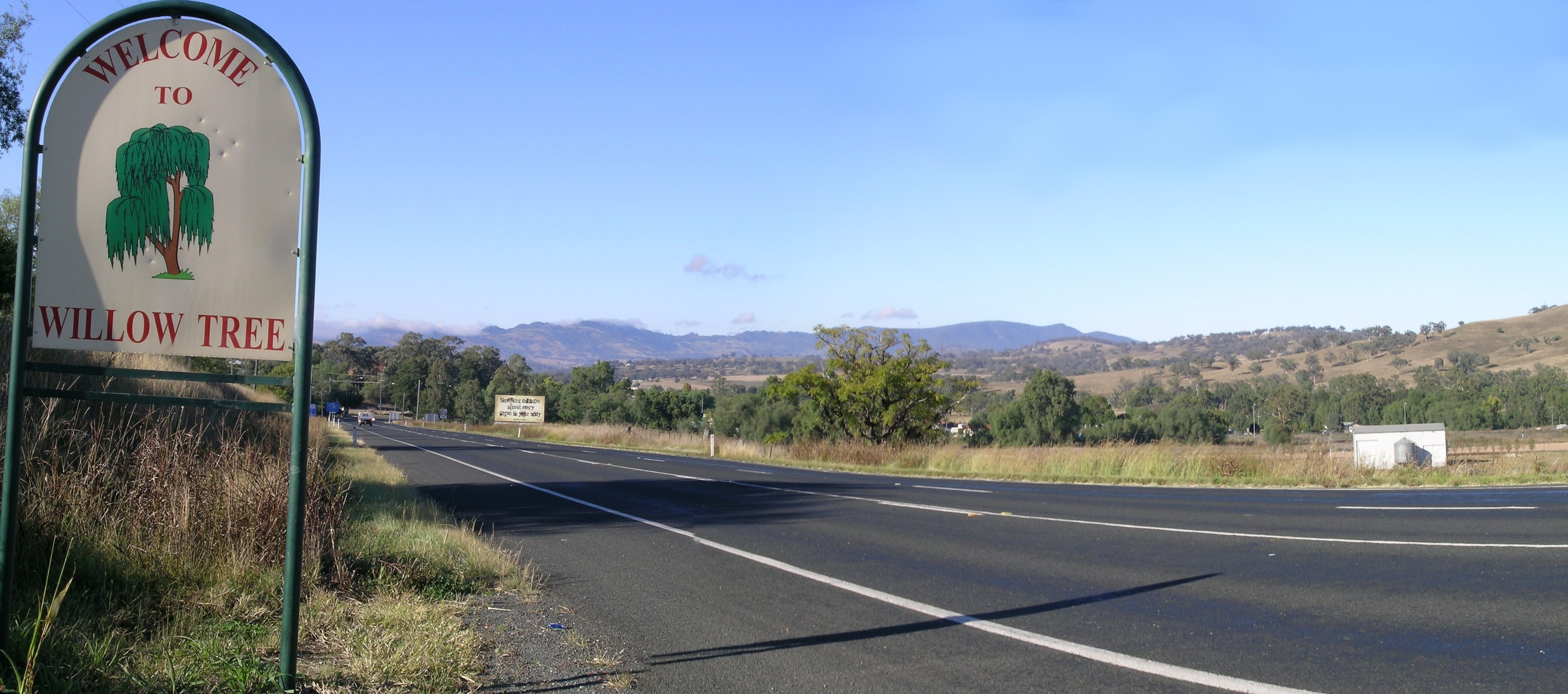
- Willow Tree with the Liverpool Range in the background

- Coordinates: 31°39′S 150°44′E
- Population: 308 (2016 census)
- Established: 1870
- Postcode(s): 2339
- Location: 14 km (9 mi) from Quirindi
- LGA(s): Liverpool Plains Shire
- State electorate(s): Upper Hunter
- Federal division(s): New England
Mean max temp	Mean min temp	Annual rainfall
35 °C; 95 °F	10 °C; 50 °F	722 mm 28.4 in

Willow Tree is a village composed of about 308 people, located in New South Wales, Australia. It is situated in the Liverpool Plains, 14 kilometres south of Quirindi near the junction of the Kamilaroi and New England Highways. The town itself is small but the farms extend southwest out to the township of Warrah. It is a service centre to the rural areas of Warrah and Mount Parry.

== History ==
Willow Tree is located at the north-eastern corner of the enormous Warrah grant which was made out to the Australian Agricultural Company in 1833. An inn was established on the future town site, at the junction of the roads north to Quirindi and north-east to Wallabadah in the mid-19th century. It was, however, the arrival of the railway in the 1870s that led to settlement. Willow Tree Post Office opened on 1 August 1872 (though known as Warrah for a few weeks in 1877).

The village was surveyed when part of the Warrah grant was subdivided and sold in 1908.

== Demographics ==
According to the 2016 census, the village comprises 308 people, excluding impermanent residents. Of these, 159 (52.5%) were male and 144 (47.5%) were female. Aboriginal and Torres Strait Islander people made up 6.2% of the population. Their median age was 46 years, compared to the national median age of 38. Children aged under 15 years made up 16.6% of the population and people aged 65 years and over made up 22.2% of the population.

83.4% of people living in Willow Tree were born in Australia. The only other response for country of birth was England 1.0%. 86.3% of people only spoke English at home. The only other response for language spoken at home was Punjabi 1.0%..

The Census question about religion is optional; of the people who answered it, the most common responses were Anglican 36.7%, Catholic 20.9%, No Religion 25.1% and Uniting Church 3.5%

53.8% of the residents over fifteen years old were in a registered marriage and 4.3% in a de facto marriage.

== Education ==
Education is provided by a public preschool and a public primary school, Willow Tree Public School.

== Transportation ==
Willow Tree station is on the Main North railway line, 375 km from Sydney. The station opened in 1877 as Warrah, and was renamed Willow Tree in 1879. It continues to be served by a daily rail service operated by a NSW TrainLink Xplorer train to and from Sydney and Armidale/Moree. The train to Armidale/Moree stops at 2:25pm and the train to Sydney stops at 11:41am. They only stop on request.
