= Liverpool Plains =

Agricultural region in New South Wales, Australia

Coordinates: 30°23′05″S 149°20′43″E

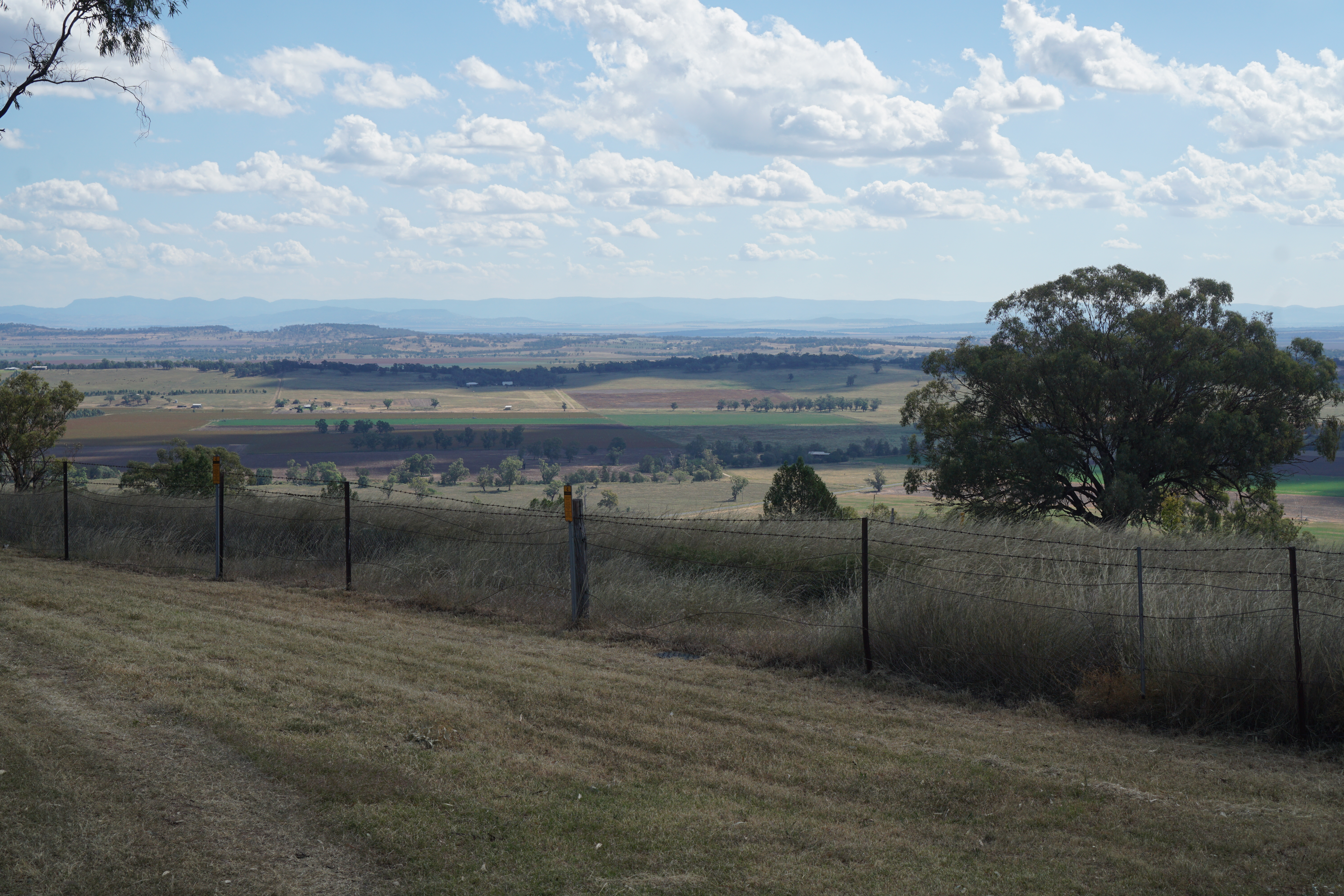
View out over the Liverpool Plains from near Quirindi

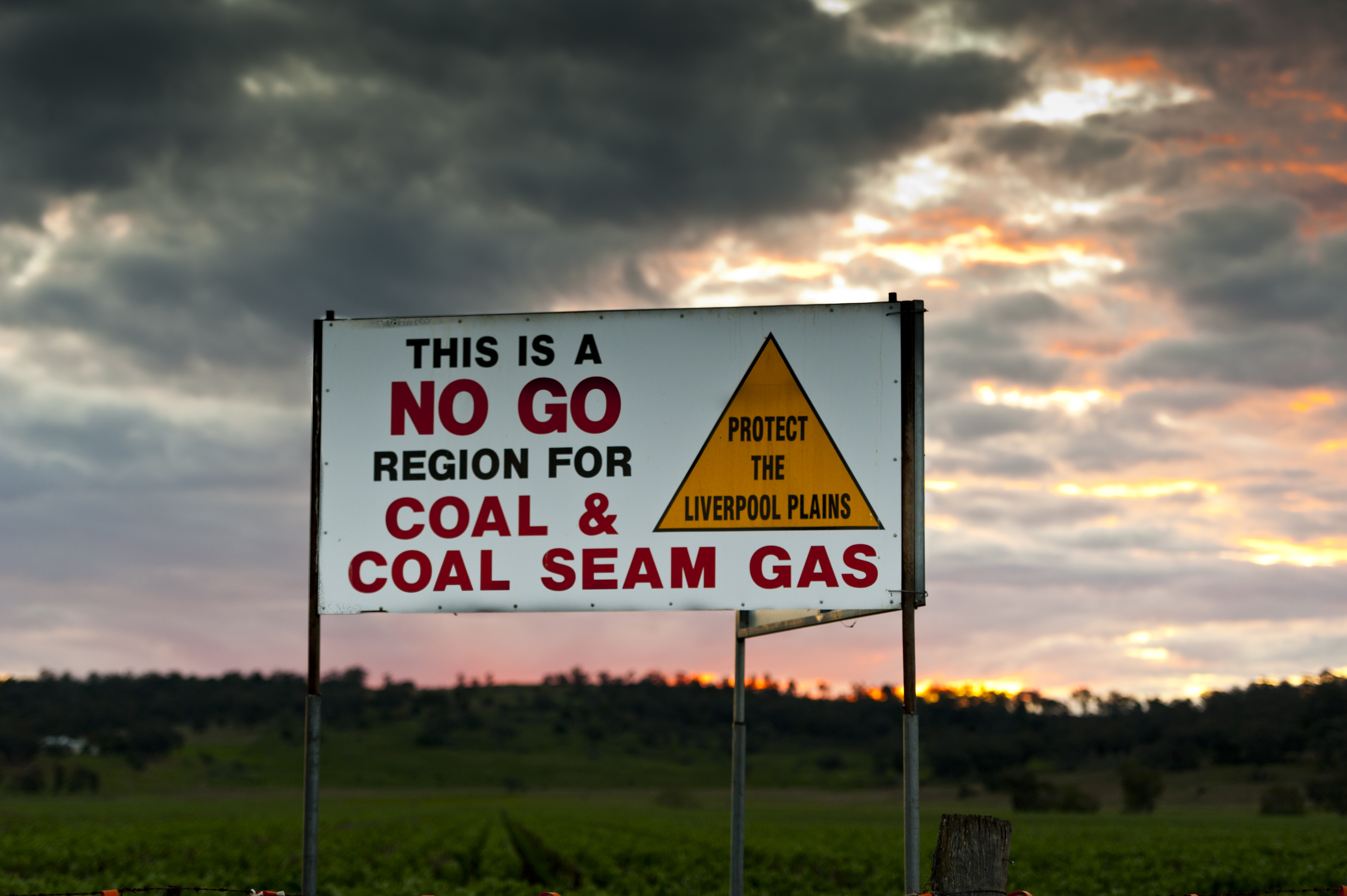
A sign protesting coal and gas mining in the Liverpool Plains, NSW

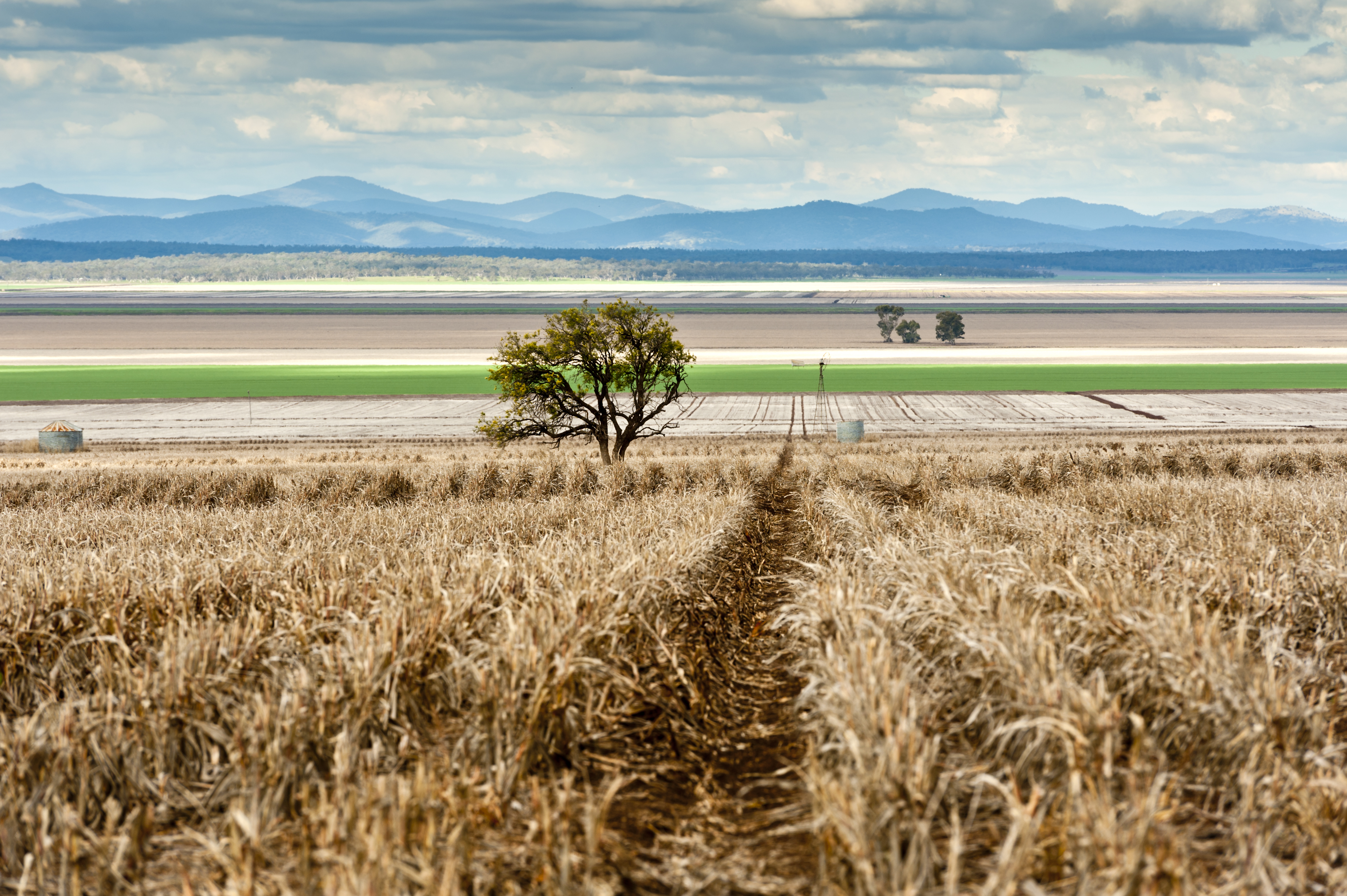
Hay fields, Liverpool Plains

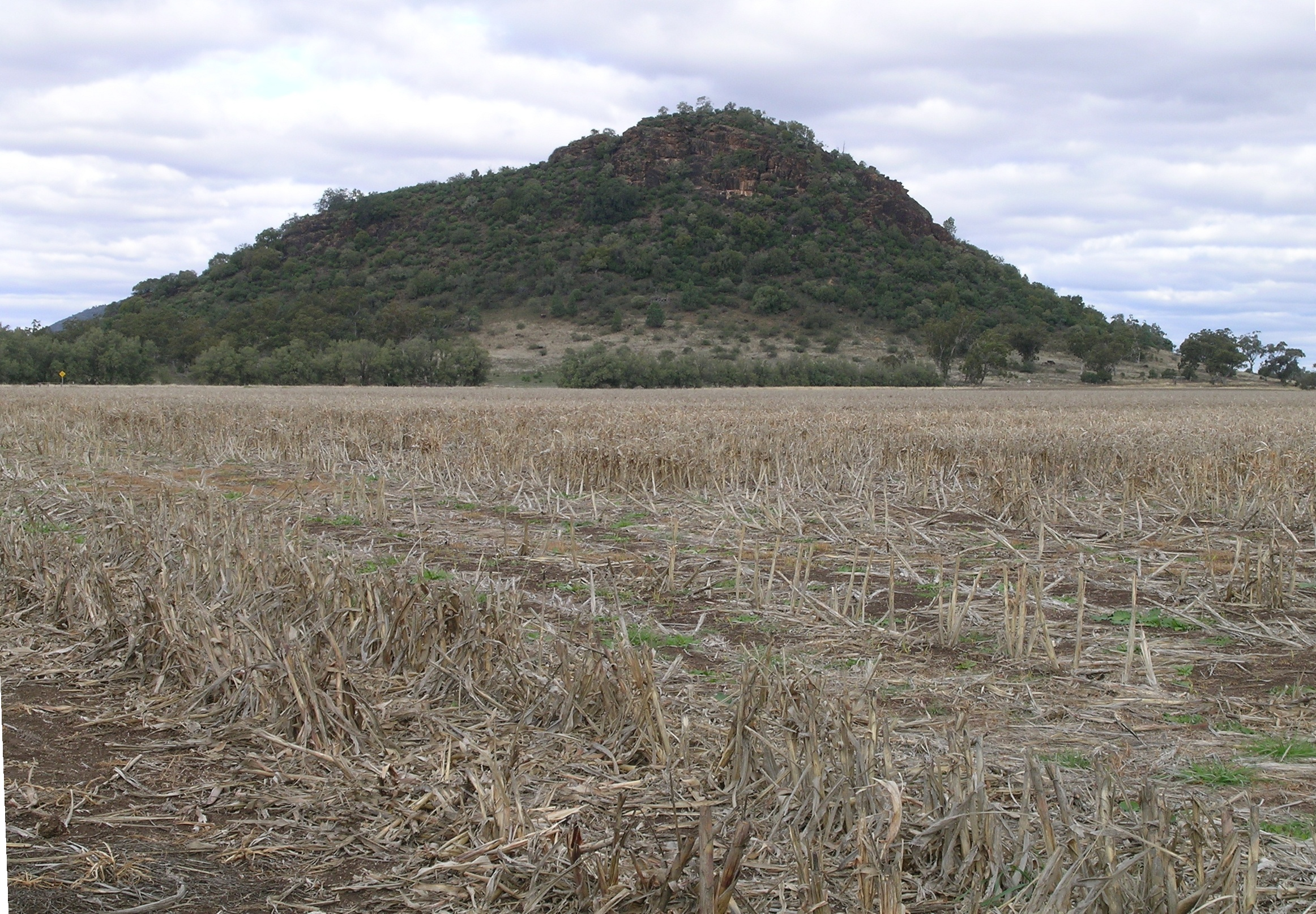
One of the many hills that dot the Liverpool Plains, Mullaley, NSW

The Liverpool Plains are an extensive agricultural area covering about 12,000 km^{2} (4,600 sq mi) of the north-western slopes of New South Wales in Australia.

These plains are a region of prime agricultural land bounded to the east by the Great Dividing Range, to the south by the Liverpool Range and on the west by the Warrumbungle Range. The area is drained by the Namoi River and its tributaries, the Mooki River and the Peel River. There are many depressions, across the plains, which remain as lakes for long periods after heavy rain. These plains are unusual in that many steep hills arise suddenly from the plains.

Towns in the Liverpool Plains include Gunnedah, Narrabri, Quirindi, Werris Creek and Tamworth. Smaller villages include Breeza, Carroll, Mullaley and Willow Tree.

Most of the region nowadays comes under the jurisdiction of Liverpool Plains Shire Council. However substantial parts of the region also form part of the Gunnedah and Tamworth local government areas.

== History ==
The Liverpool Plains were initially inhabited by Australian Aboriginal people. In the 19th century they were mostly Gamilaraay. English surveyor general John Oxley was the first European to visit the area while exploring the Macquarie River area in 1818. The Plains were subsequently named after Robert Jenkinson, 2nd Earl of Liverpool, the Prime Minister of the United Kingdom. Nowlands Gap, a pass over the Liverpool Range, was discovered by William Nowland and has been described as the gateway to the Liverpool Plains. In the early 1830s, Henry Dangar surveyed and explored the area and made land claims in the name of the Australian Agricultural Company. In 1838, 28–30 Aboriginal Australians were murdered by a group of convicts; seven men were convicted of the "Liverpool Plains Massacre" (also referred to as the Myall Creek massacre) and hanged.

During the 1860s Captain Thunderbolt (Fred Ward) and two accomplices robbed inns and mail-coaches in the Liverpool Plains district.

== Agriculture ==
The Liverpool Plains is ranked the fourth best soil type in the world. The Liverpool Plains area is typical of temperate woodland regions in south-east Australia. It has an elevation of approximately 270 metres above sea level. Most of the 620 mm of rainfall the area experiences each year is high intensity and occurs in the warmer months, from October through March. Rivers run from the Liverpool Ranges in the south-east to the Namoi River valley in the north-east, where elevation falls to 264 metres above sea level. Soils in the area are distinctly black, have a high fertility rating and store a lot of water. They are well suited to growing winter crops such as wheat, but at risk of erosion when cultivated.

Agricultural settlement of the Liverpool Plains started in the late 1820s after the pass was discovered and since then it has been one of the prime agricultural regions of New South Wales. The major land uses of the Liverpool Plains are cropping and grazing. The main crops include barley, chickpeas, mungbeans, faba beans, sorghum, sunflowers, soybeans, maize, wheat and cotton while grazing comprises beef cattle and sheep mainly for prime lambs. The more fertile alluvial soils (native grassland and poplar box country) have been cleared, while larger areas of remnant vegetation (ironbark and Callitris pine) remain on poorer sandy and ridgetop soils.

== See also ==
- Agriculture in Australia
