= Australian Agricultural Company =

Australian company

Australian Agricultural Company Limited
- Type: Public
- Traded as: ASX: AAC
- Industry: Beef and agriculture
- Founded: 1824; 202 years ago
- Headquarters: Brisbane, Queensland, Australia
- Key people: David Harris (CEO)
- Number of employees: 500
- Website: www.aaco.com.au

The Australian Agricultural Company (AACo) is a public-listed Australian company that, as of 2018, owns and operates feedlots and farms covering around seven million hectares (17 million acres) of land in Queensland and the Northern Territory, roughly one percent of Australia's land mass. As of July 2008 AACo had a staff of 500 and operated 24 cattle stations and two feedlots, consisting of over 565,000 beef cattle.

Since 2022, more than half the shares of AACo have been owned by the Tavistock Group, the investment vehicle of Joe Lewis.

== Founding of the company ==
Australian Agricultural Company Act 1824
- Act of Parliament
- Parliament of the United Kingdom
- Long title: An Act for granting certain Powers and Authorities to a Company to be incorporated by Charter, to be called "The Australian Agricultural Company," for the Cultivation and Improvement of Waste Lands in the Colony of New South Wales, and for other Purposes relating thereto.
- Citation: 5 Geo. 4. c. 86
- Territorial extent: United Kingdom

Dates
- Royal assent: 21 June 1824
- Commencement: 21 June 1824 (Note: The Acts of Parliament (Commencement) Act 1793.)
- Repealed: 7 August 1912
Other legislation
Repealed by	Australian Agricultural Company Act 1912

Status: Repealed

Text of statute as originally enacted

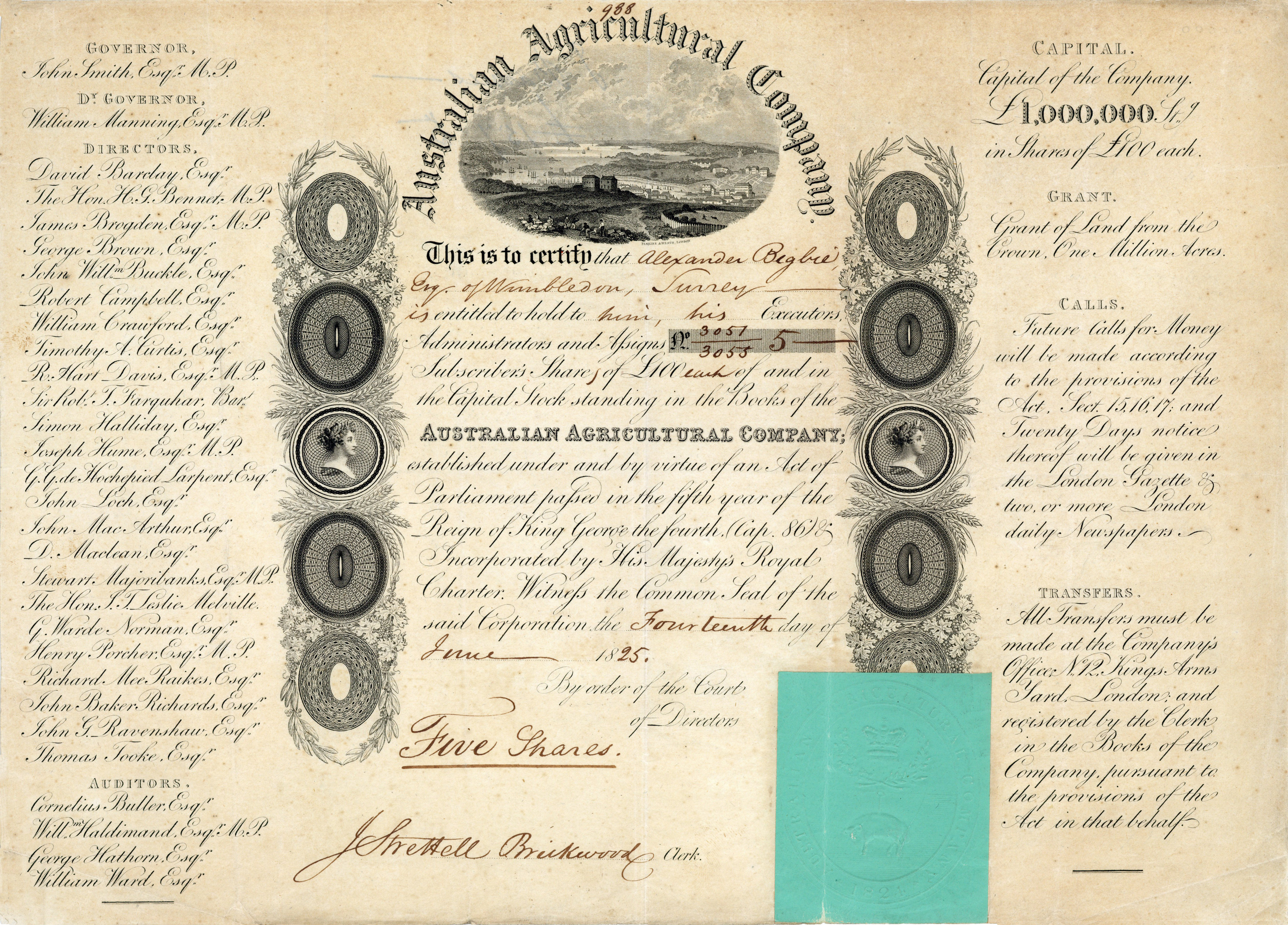
Founder's stock certificate of the Australian Agricultural Company for 5 shares of £100 each, issued 14 June 1825, printed on parchment

The inquiry into the colony of New South Wales conducted by John Bigge from 1819 to 1823 recommended that large grants of land be given to "men of real capital" who would utilise significant levels of convict labour to maintain these estates. The inquiry was initiated by the Earl of Bathurst and John Macarthur to protect both the system of land grants to wealthy individuals and also the transportation system of cheap prison labour to the colony. As a result of the Bigge Inquiry, the Australian Agricultural Company (A.A.Co.) was formed by the Australian Agricultural Company Act 1824 (5 Geo. 4. c. 86), an act of the British Parliament and incorporated by royal charter on 1 November 1824 for the cultivation and improvement of waste lands in the colony of New South Wales and other purposes, amongst which was the production of fine merino wool for export to Great Britain. A group of about 400 well-connected British investors funded the company with a combined capital of one million pounds (made up of ten thousand shares of £100 each). A grant of one million acres (about 405,000 hectares) was obtained in the colony for agricultural development, subject to the performance of certain conditions, with the company to be allowed to select the location of the grant.

Among the principal members of this company were the Attorney-General and the Solicitor-General of England, 28 members of Parliament, including Mr. Brougham, and Joseph Hume, the Governor, Deputy Governor and eight of the directors of the Bank of England; the Chairman and Deputy-Chairman and five directors of the British East India Company, besides many other eminent bankers and merchants of England. There were 41 investors based in New South Wales which included some of the wealthiest colonists such as the Macarthur family and Phillip Parker King.

== Occupation of the initial Port Stephens land grant ==
The initial million acres selected under the founding charter extended from Port Stephens, embracing the Karuah River valley, to the Gloucester flats, and included all of the coastal region north to the Manning River. The company commenced its operations in 1826 with its first manager Robert Dawson, who stocked the property with flocks of Merino sheep. The wool produced by the company was to be exported to Great Britain to ensure a cheap reliable supply of British wool which at that time was being outpriced by German imports.

The AACo's land grant encompassed almost the entire country of the Worimi Indigenous Australian people. Dawson maintained a friendly approach to the Worimi and decided to locate the principal settlement of the AACo at Carabean (which he later called Carrington) on the north shore of Port Stephens. He was soon followed by around 200 convicts and servants with 200 cattle and 700 sheep.

The six hundred or so Worimi who resided around Carabean were very helpful to the company employees, assisting them greatly in building bark huts and providing them with water and food. They also guided Dawson up the Karuah River showing him the best open areas to graze his sheep. The Worimi were rewarded with tobacco, sugar, flour and clothing. Dawson made some of them "native constables" to police their own people against stealing and to intercept runaway convict employees.

Chart of the initial Australian Agricultural Company land grant drawn in 1828

When an eight-year-old Worimi boy named "Tommy" was killed in the Myall Lakes region of the grant, Dawson had the perpetrators arrested. They were later charged and transported to Norfolk Island. However, when a respected Worimi elder known as "Tony" was shot dead by a company employee, the only punishment given was to have that person removed from the settlement. Dawson later organised an armed military party to the Myall Lakes to capture the Worimi responsible for spearing a shepherd. He was unsuccessful but was satisfied that he had caused "a salutary terror with which our vigourous pursuit inspired in the natives".

Dawson developed the company's assets in the northern parts of the land grant by establishing farms at Booral, Stroud and Gloucester. However, in 1828, Dawson was dismissed as the company's superintendent and replaced by John Macarthur. Dawson was scapegoated for the initial poor performance of the company, which encountered problems due to the unsuitability of the Port Stephens land and climate to the raising of sheep. The AACo was also losing money due to the Macarthur family profiteering from using their position to sell the company inferior quality sheep at elevated prices from their personal flocks.

Macarthur was soon replaced by James Ebsworth and in 1830 the Arctic explorer, Edward Parry was appointed in the position of commissioner to run the AACo operations in New South Wales.

Parry implemented a "most strict semi-military regime" over the AACo properties and enforced a combative strategy against those Worimi who opposed colonisation. After a shepherd was speared in 1830, Parry furnished the companys' soldiers, constables and armed servants with as much ammunition as they required and sent them on a punitive expedition to the upper Karuah River. This mission resulted in the killing of at least one Worimi man and the wounding of several others.

Only days later, Parry exacted summary punishment against the northern clans of the Worimi after another shepherd was speared. This time of a group of "friendly" southern Worimi men were armed and led by a "black constable" named "Jonathan". This militia intercepted and killed a supposed leader of the northern Worimi and severely wounded a number of others. Parry wrote that he was confident that these examples of "summary justice will have a beneficial effect in deterring the blacks".

However, the northern clans of Worimi continued their resistance, spearing more shepherds and taking sheep. In 1833, a worker at the company's cattle station north-east of Gloucester was killed and Parry organised a large party of mounted soldiers and armed company employees on another punitive expedition. Despite tying up and flogging a Worimi man to extract information, those responsible were not located. They did however shoot a number of Aboriginal people not involved in the spearing. This provoked a complaint from the pioneering Manning River settler, William Wynter, who accused Parry of undue violence against Aboriginal people, including placing bounties "for the heads of some of the blacks".

Other techniques were also applied in removing the northern clans of Worimi from the land. In 1833, multiple sources refer to one or possibly two mass poisonings of Aboriginal Australians by employees of the AACo at an out-station called Upper Gangat. Arsenic was placed in dampers and given to the Aboriginal people to eat. Many died and the place was subsequently known as Baal Bora, a pidgin English term loosely translated as "no more dancing/ceremony". The locality is still called Belbora which is situated on the Bucketts Way east of Gloucester.

== Liverpool Plains land grants ==
Parry found much of the land in the initial grant useless for the company's purposes and lobbied the colonial government to have part of the grant exchanged for better land located to the north on the Liverpool Plains. After some protracted wrangling with Governor Bourke, Parry was allowed in 1832 to swap the eastern part of the Port Stephens grant for two new areas. These were the Warrah Estate of 101,010 ha (249,600 acres), and the Peel Estate of 126,787 ha (313,298 acres), located along the left bank of the Peel River to the south of present-day Tamworth, New South Wales.

The township of West Tamworth adjacent to the present city was the original company-owned business centre for the area. In 1856, Arthur Hodgson was appointed general superintendent of the company. The pioneering settlers of the area were ordered to leave and paid little from the company for their properties.

Convicts soon became the companies largest type of employee, although those who had served a sentence, aborigines and indentured servants on seven-year contracts were also employed with the latter making up the bulk of initial employees. The AACo attempted to exploit convict labour to generate a profit. When the supply of convicts was facing potential limits in the mid-1830s, company directors attempted to source convicts from the city-state of Hamburg.

It is one of Australia's oldest still-operating companies. Its headquarters are today in Brisbane and it has been listed (or relisted) on the Australian Stock Exchange since 2001.

== Coal ==
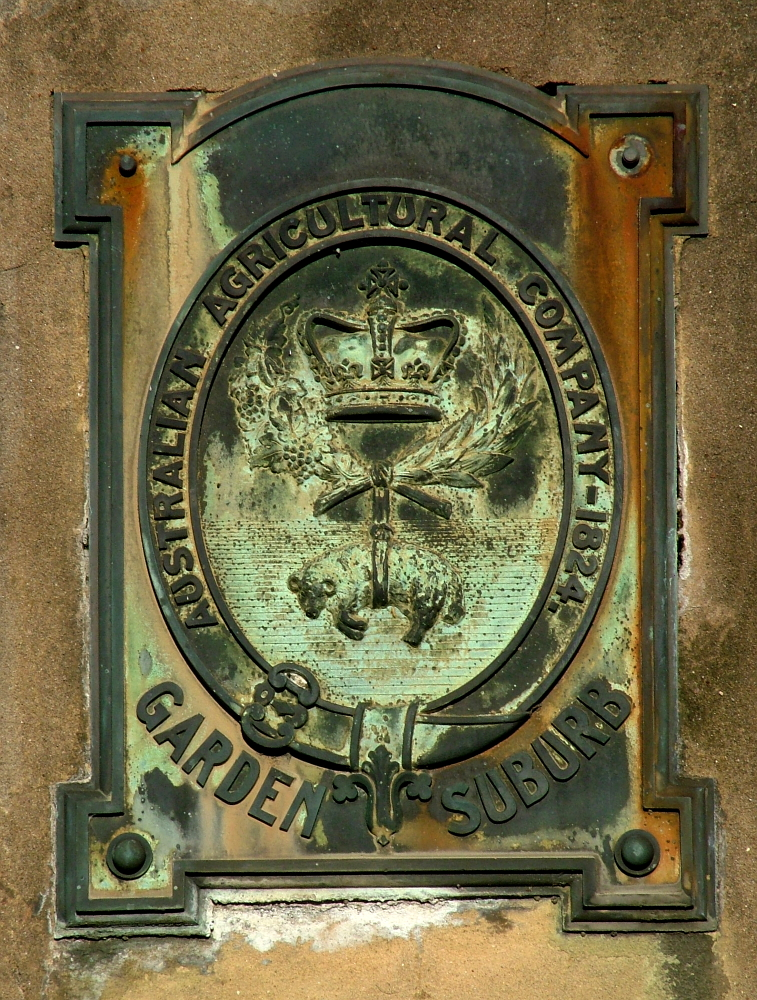
Australian Agricultural Company plaque on a sandstone column at Learmonth Park, Hamilton, dated 1914.

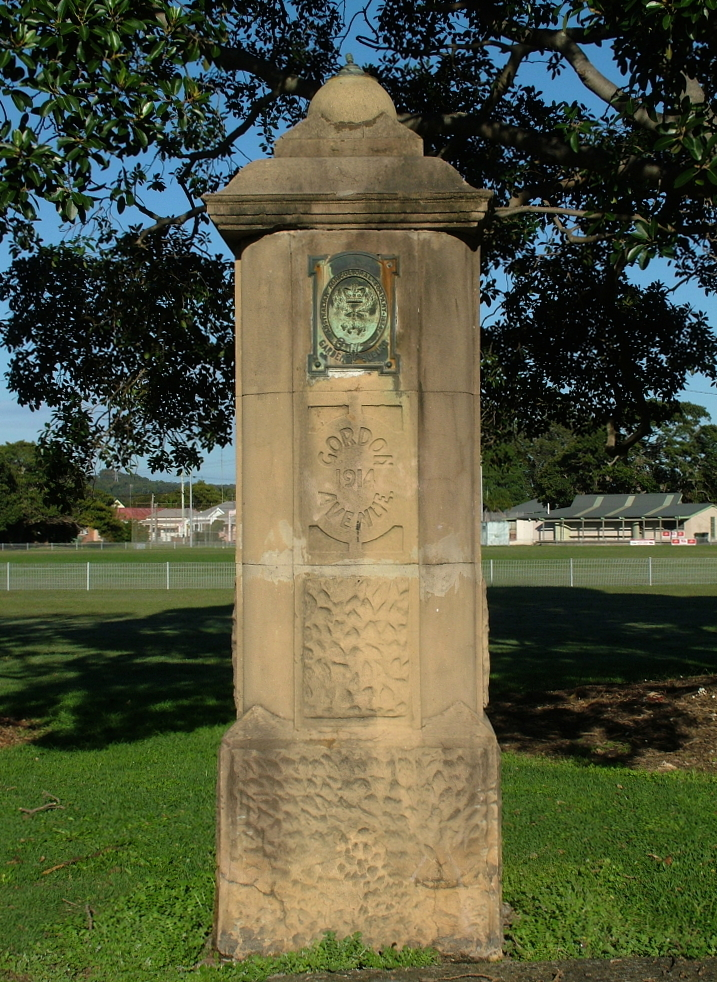
Sandstone columns erected in Gordon Avenue, Hamilton. Dated 1914.

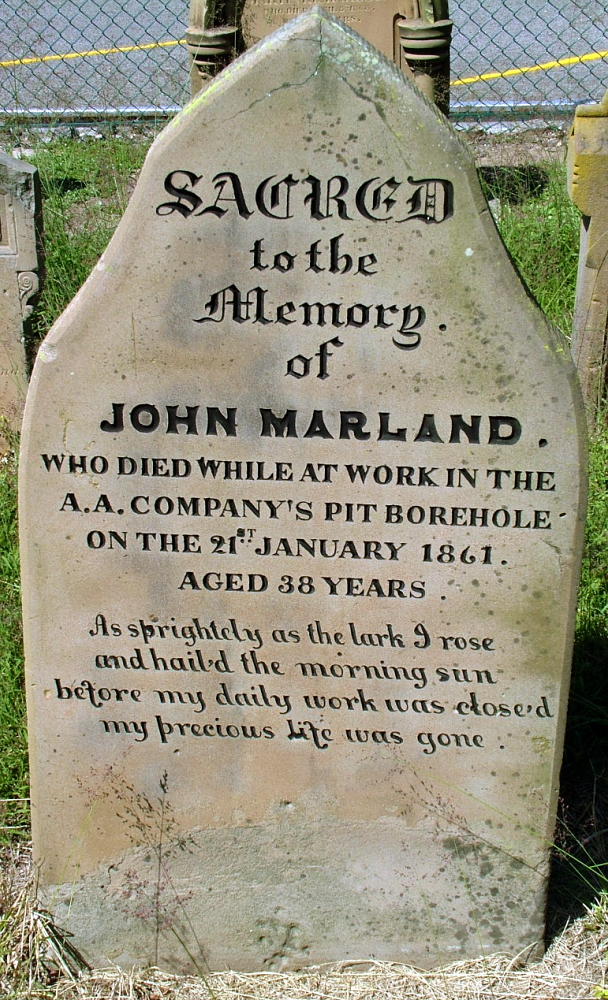
Grave stone of John Marland, who died while working in the Hamilton Borehole; located behind Christ Church Cathedral, Newcastle.

The colonial government was not able to manage coal production efficiently. On 3 May 1833 the company received land grants at Newcastle totaling 777 ha (1,920 acres) plus a 31-year monopoly on that town's coal traffic. The company became the largest exporter of coal from Newcastle for many decades. They also bought 518 ha (1,280 acres) of freehold and 1,267 ha (3,131 acres) of leasehold land on the South Maitland coalfields at Weston, near Kurri Kurri, where they built the Hebburn Colliery. Because of drought and depression during the 1840s mining created more profit than wool production did.

By December 1903 the pit was sending a fully loaded train away each day. By 1912, the output exceeded 2,500 long tons (2,540 t) per day and a large overseas trade had developed from this mine. In May 1906 the company purchased a half-share in the Aberdare Junction to Cessnock railway for £40,000 which, already owning the other half, placed them in full ownership of the line. With the post-Great War slump, the company ceased its coal-mining activities in the early 1920s, sold their assets therein, and moved on into the cattle industry.

The AACo's coat-of-arms are affixed to two stone columns erected in Gordon Avenue, Hamilton (originally known as Pittown, Borehole or Happy Flat) – located on the corners Learmonth Park (Alexander Street and Gordon Avenue, and Jenner Parade and Gordon Avenue) – in an area once known as Newcastle's garden suburb.

=== Australia's first "railed way" ===
On 10 December 1831 the Australian Agricultural Company officially opened Australia's first "railed way", (Note: The term "railed way" refers to a configuration that preceded those of full-scale railways. For example, the AA Co funicular had short, brittle, cast-iron fishbelly rails that would have been inadequate for the higher speeds and weights of trains on the railways being developed at the time.) a funicular that started at the intersection of Brown Street and Church Street, Newcastle. 350 metres (380 yards) long, privately owned and operated to service the A Pit coal mine, it ran on cast-iron fishbelly rails, partly on a 160 metres (170 yards) steeply inclined plane. It was described as follows:

Once raised up the shaft, the coal was yarded or emptied into wagons; each of 1 ton capacity. Loaded wagons were run in pairs down a self-acting inclined plane railway (two loaded wagons going down hauled another two emptied ones up). They were then pushed by hand, assisted by gravity, along a graded wooden trestle. It crossed a sandy area, now occupied by Hunter Street and the Great Northern Railway, to a loading staith at which small ships could berth while coal was tipped into their holds.

The AACo constructed a total of three funiculars: the second was in 1837 to service B Pit and the third was in mid-1842 to service C Pit. The funicular from B Pit connected with the 1831 funicular. The funicular from C Pit, which made use of the last of the government’s offer of cheap convict labour, fed on to an extended funicular to reach the port. It is presumed that when the A Pit mine was exhausted in July 1846 its funicular components were directly transferred to form the C Pit funicular, although no hard evidence can support this thought.

On 10 December 2006 a plaque was unveiled on the southern shore of Newcastle Harbour celebrating this event.

== Short-lived coal monopoly and providing land access: disputes with James Mitchell ==
In 1828, three years after commencing their 31-year lease, the AACo was accorded a monopolistic position after the company received a grant of 810 ha (2,000 acres) of coal land in the centre of Newcastle. Further, it was feared that the company may have had control of the entire coal supply in the colony had the Crown Law Officers responsible for the substitution of a grant for the lease not objected and an alternative agreed upon.

Between 1835 and 1850, the AACo was involved in significant Australian historical law events relating to monopolistic coal mining and private railway access.

In 1835 James Mitchell purchased approximately 360 ha (900 acres) of coastal land extending from the far side of Merewether ridge to Glenrock Lagoon and named the property the Burwood estate, which was later extended to 1,834 acres. Not long after Ludwig Leichhardt’s visit to the Burwood estate in 1842, Mitchell announced the planned commissioning of tramroad tunnels, Australia’s first two railway tunnels, through Burwood ridge (or bluff).

While Leichhardt visited the Burwood estate he drew up the stratigraphy of the coastline. It is speculated that Leichhardt may have established the extent of the coal seams under Mitchell’s property. Mitchell claimed the construction of the tunnels was to allow access to Burwood Beach in order to build a salt works. It is further speculated that Mitchell actually sought to destroy the Australian Agricultural Company’s legal monopoly on coal mining. Prior to these events Mitchell had already approached Governor Gipps seeking:

1. a repeal of the Metallic Ores Act;
2. Newcastle be made a free port and
3. that he be permitted to mine and use coal from Burwood estate as fuel for a copper smelter.

Mitchell was unsuccessful with only his request to use coal as fuel in a copper smelter.

Although Mitchell had no legal use of coal, the commissioned tunnel project commenced in 1846 with the cutting line being directly into a coal seam. Between 2 and 3 thousand tonnes of coal were extracted but unusable owing to the AACo's monopoly.

While Mitchell’s operations were going on, a number of small illegal mines operated in the district in defiance of the monopoly. A mine near East Maitland operated by Mr James Brown undercut the AACo's price to supply coal to steamships at Morpeth which led to prosecution. The government’s legal advice after this case was that they would have to individually prosecute every illegal mine, which Governor FitzRoy believed the cost of the prosecutions should be paid for by the Australian Agricultural Company. In 1847, the NSW Legislative Council created the Coal Inquiry and appointed a select committee to investigate the matter. Both Mitchell and Brown gave evidence; Mitchell in relation to his tunnel and Brown in relation to price cutting. Before the committee could issue any recommendations, the Australian Agricultural Company relinquished its monopoly. Mitchell proceeded to lease out the coal rights on the Burwood estate, with five mines being quickly established by J & A Brown, Donaldson, Alexander Brown, Nott and Morgan.

Because the AACo owned the land between the Burwood estate and the Port of Newcastle the company refused to allow Mitchell to transport coal by rail across its land. Mitchell successfully lobbied the government again by having New South Wales' first private act of Parliament titled, Burwood and Newcastle Tramroad Act 1850, passed, that specifically allowed Mitchell to carry coal through AACo lands.

Also in 1850, the coal mining monopoly ended with the peal of the Metallic Ores Act as promised by Governor Gipps, allowing copper to be brought into NSW duty-free. After the monopoly ended, Mitchell established the copper smelter in 1851 until its closure in 1872. In 1913, salvaged bricks from the site were used to cap some of the old mines.

== Company towns ==
- Stroud
- Carrington
- Hamilton

== Cattle stations ==
Cattle grazing for the production of beef has long been a focus of the company.

The managing director of AACo. from 1974 to 1988 was Trevor Schmidt, whose family also owned Alroy Downs Station in the Northern Territory.

In 2012 the company entered an agreement with the Bunuba Cattle Company where AACo would manage the operations and the Bunuba would receive an annual rent and training opportunities and have complete access to their lands. The Bunuba hold the leases to Leopold Downs and Fairfield Downs stations, located north of Fitzroy Crossing. Together the properties occupy an area of 4,046 square kilometres (1,562 sq mi) and have a maximum carrying capacity of 20,000 head of cattle.

AACo. acquired two properties in the Northern Territory, Welltree and La Belle Stations, in 2013 from R. M. Williams Agricultural Holdings. The properties had been bought for A$27.1 million after R. M. Williams went into receivership.

The company owns Anthony Lagoon, Austral Downs, Brunette Downs, Camfield and Delamere Station in the Northern Territory. In Queensland it owns Canobie, Headingly, South Galway, Dalgonally, Carrum, Glentana, Wylarah, Goonoo station and feedlot, Aronui feedlot and Wondoola stations.

The archives of the Australian Agricultural Company and related companies and properties are accessible through the Noel Butlin Archives Centre at the Australian National University in Canberra, Australia https://archivescollection.anu.edu.au/index.php/australian-agricultural-company

== See also ==
- List of oldest companies in Australia
- Agriculture in Australia
- Avon Downs Station
- East Warrah Woolshed
- Windy Station Woolshed
