= Xerochloa imberbis =

Scientific classification
- Kingdom: Plantae
- Clade: Tracheophytes
- Clade: Angiosperms
- Clade: Monocots
- Clade: Commelinids
- Order: Poales
- Family: Poaceae
- Subfamily: Panicoideae
- Genus: Xerochloa
- Species: X. imberbis

Binomial name
- Xerochloa imberbis R.Br.

Species of grass

Xerochloa imberbis, commonly known as rice grass, grows along the tropical coasts of Australia from Karratha in Western Australia through to Cardwell in North Queensland.
