= James Bowman (surgeon) =

English-born Australian politician and surgeon (1784–1846)

Member of the New South Wales Legislative Council
- In office 1 December 1823 – 22 November 1825
- Appointed by: George IV
- Monarch: George IV
- Governor: Sir Thomas Brisbane

Personal details
- Born: 1784 Carlisle, England
- Died: 23 August 1846 (aged 61–62) Ravensworth, Colony of New South Wales

James Bowman (1784 – 23 August 1846) was an English-born Australian politician and surgeon.

Bowman was born in Carlisle to Edward and Ann Bowman. He was a Royal Navy surgeon from 1807, having previously been an assistant surgeon, and served in the Napoleonic Wars. In 1816, he migrated to the colony of New South Wales, and in 1823 he married Mary Isabella Macarthur, daughter of John and Elizabeth Macarthur; they had five children. He served as one of the first five members of the New South Wales Legislative Council, established in 1823 by letters patent. He served concurrently as Principal Colonial Surgeon and then until 1 December 1828. Bowman died at Ravensworth in the Hunter Valley in 1846.
