= 1858 New England and Macleay colonial by-election =

By-election in New South Wales, Australia

A by-election was held for the New South Wales Legislative Assembly electorate of New England and Macleay on 26 November 1858 because of the resignation of Abram Moriarty, for reasons that included the difficulty of serving a far distant electorate.

== Dates ==
| Date | Event |
|---|---|
| 13 October 1858 | Abram Moriarty resigned. |
| 19 October 1858 | Writ of election issued by the Speaker of the Legislative Assembly. |
| 26 November 1858 | Nominations at Armidale. |
| 14 December 1858 | Polling day |
| 30 December 1858 | Return of writ |

== Candidates ==
- Alexander Dick was a Sydney solicitor, who had advertised himself as a candidate, however he sent a letter to the returning officer declining to go to the poll.
- James Eames advertised himself as a candidate, however this appears to have been a joke, and there was no seconder for his nomination.
- James Hart was a Sydney solicitor.
- Merion Moriarty, the father of Abram, advertised himself as a candidate, however was not nominated.
- Thomas Rusden was a squatter in the New England district and the former member for the district, who had been defeated at the 1858 election. He had petitioned against the election, however these were rejected by the house as not complying with the requirements of the Electoral Act. On 15 October he attempted to take a seat in the assembly, but was ejected by the sergeant-at-arms. Rusden stated he was unable to nominate for the seat, asserting he was already the member.
- John Williams was a Sydney solicitor and the then current Mayor of Sydney.

== Result ==
1858 New England and Macleay by-election Friday 26 November
| Candidate | Votes | % |
|---|---|---|
| James Hart (elected) | show of hands | |
| Thomas Rusden | | |
| John Williams | | |

Neither candidate called for a poll.

== See also ==
- Electoral results for the district of New England and Macleay
- List of New South Wales state by-elections
