= New England Peppermint Grassy Woodland =

Ecological community in New South Wales

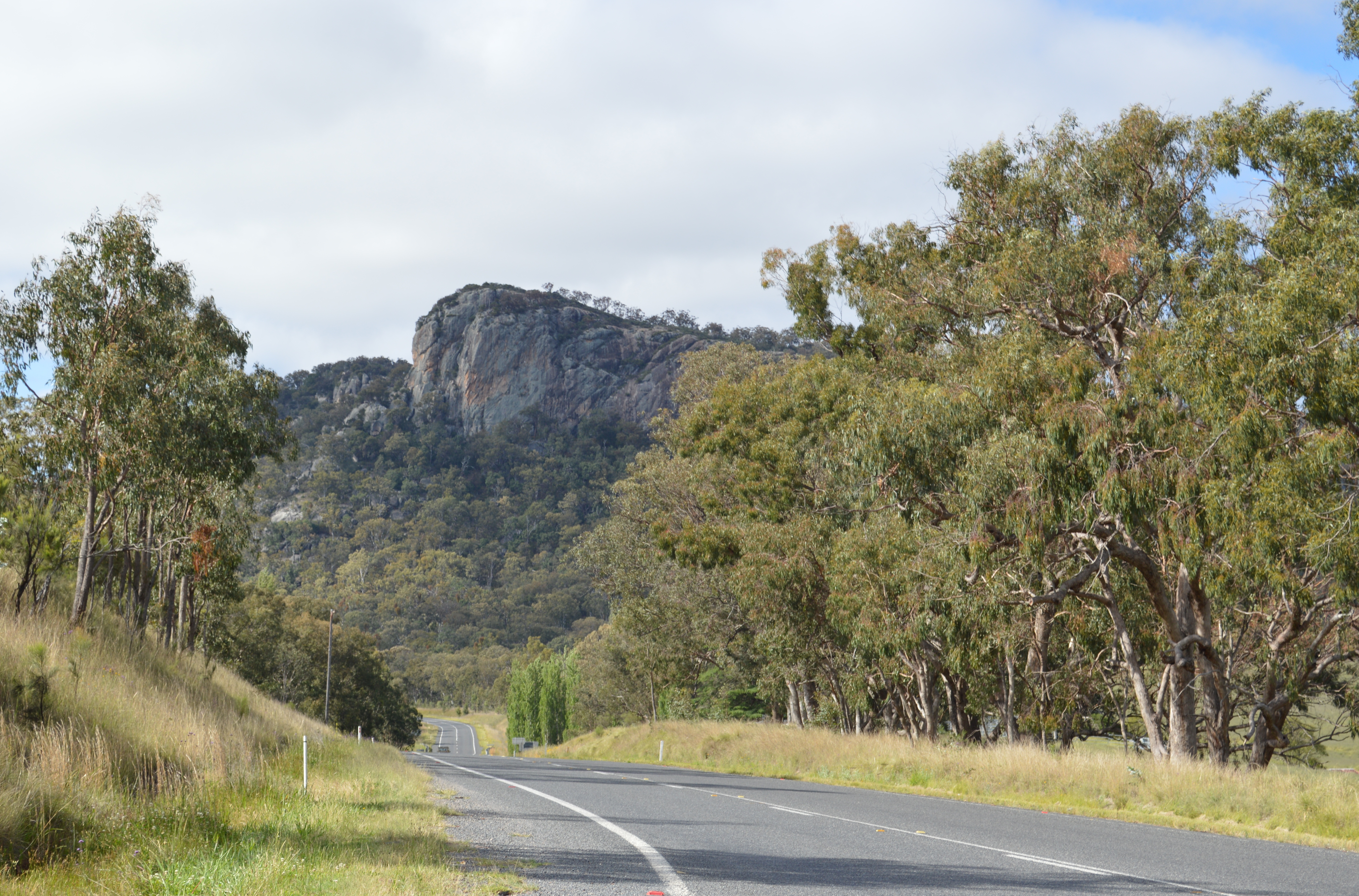
- New England Highway traversing the grasslands

Ecology
- Realm: Australasia
- Biome: Tropical and subtropical grasslands, savannas, and shrublands
- Borders: Eastern Australian temperate forests; Southeast Australia temperate savanna; Coastal Valley Grassy Woodlands

Geography
- Country: Australia
- Elevation: 750–900 metres (2,460–2,950 ft)
- Coordinates: 30.2°S 151.52°E
- Geology: Sedimentary rock
- Climate type: Subtropical highland climate (Cfb)
- Soil types: Loam-clay

The New England Peppermint Grassy Woodland is a grassy-woodland community primarily situated in the New England and Northern Tablelands regions in northern New South Wales, Australia. Named after the Eucalyptus nova-anglica, it is listed as a critically endangered ecological communities (TECs) under the Environment Protection and Biodiversity Conservation Act 1999.

== Geography ==
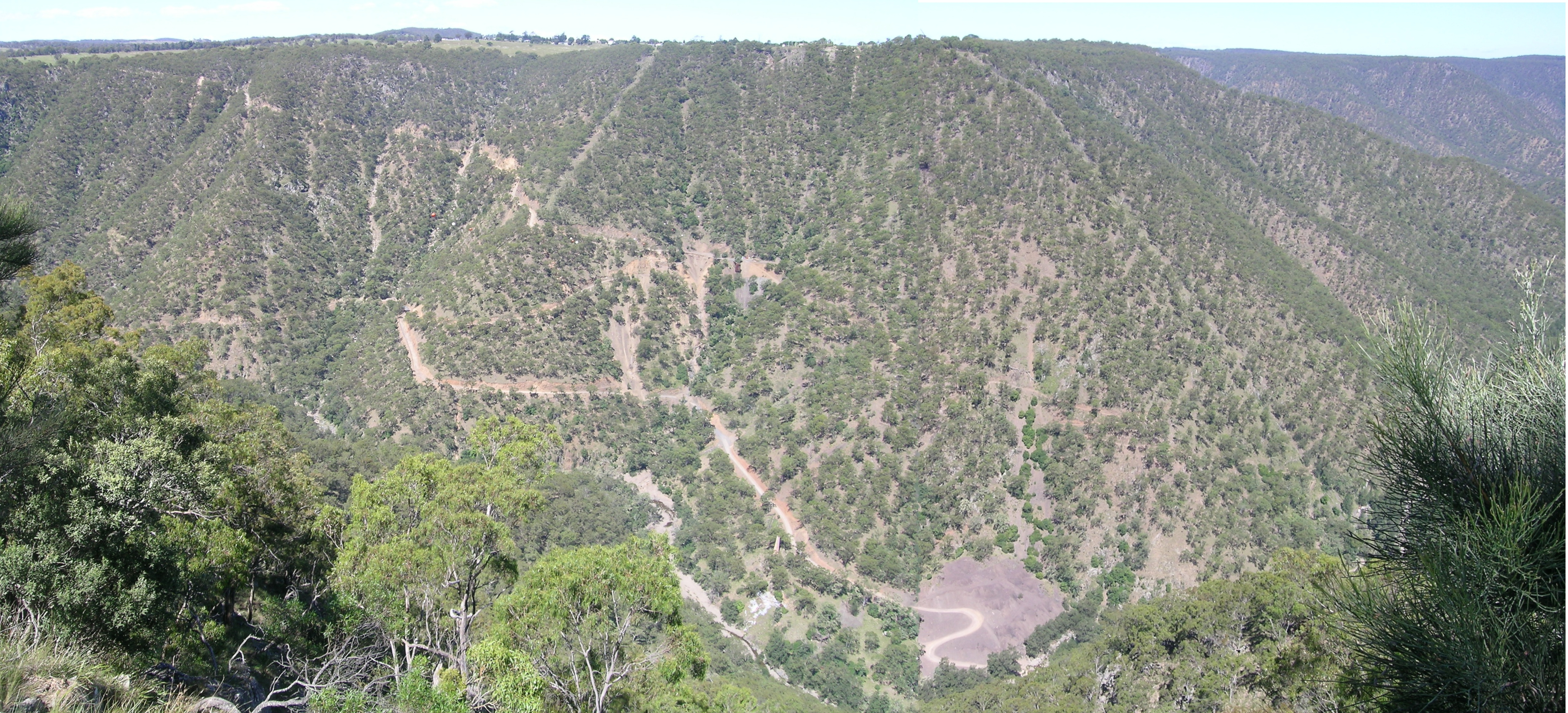
A hilly, wooded grassland in Hillgrove.

The community is found throughout the Northern Tablelands and New England bioregion in northern New South Wales, near the Queensland border, at an elevation above 750 m, on cold drainage lines, upper riparian areas, valley bottoms, and low-lying flats with badly drained soils of moderate to high fertility, with some pockets in the NSW North Coast and Nandewar.

The community stretches from Wallangarra in the north, Armidale in the centre, to Nundle in the south, though only 10% of its original habitat remains. It covers the Guyra, Inverell and Tenterfield Local Government Areas. It is one of the most significantly impacted ecoregion on the Northern Tablelands due to its fertile grazing land.

== Ecology ==
Ranging from 35 to 50 trees per hectare, the trees are mainly composed of E. nova-anglica, though secondary species such as, Eucalyptus stellulata, Eucalyptus stellulata, Eucalyptus dalrympleana, Eucalyptus blakelyi, Eucalyptus conica, Eucalyptus pauciflora and Angophora floribunda.

There is very small and undefined amount of shrubs, but a variety of grass and herbs species in the understory are present, with the common ones being Poa sieberiana and Themeda triandra. The scarce shrubs would include Bursaria spinosa, Rubus parvifolius, Lissanthe strigosa, Leucopogon fraseri, Melichrus urceolatus and Acacia dealbata.

== See also ==
- Cumberland Plain Woodland
