= Electoral district of Pastoral Districts of New England and Macleay =

Former New South Wales Legislative Council electoral district

Pastoral Districts of New England and Macleay New South Wales—Legislative Council
- State: New South Wales
- Created: 1851
- Abolished: 1856
- Namesake: New England region & Macleay River

The Electoral district of Pastoral Districts of New England and Macleay was an electorate of the New South Wales Legislative Council at a time when some of its members were elected and the balance were appointed by the Governor. It was a new electorate created in 1851 by the expansion of the Legislative Council to 54, 18 to be appointed and 36 elected. The district is located in the north of the state and covered the Northern Tablelands region of New England and part of the Mid North Coast region, including the area to the north of the Macleay River, but excluding the area south of the Macleay River which was included in the Counties of Gloucester and Macquarie. To the north was the Pastoral Districts of Clarence and Darling Downs and to the west the Pastoral Districts of Liverpool Plains and Gwydir. Polling took place in the towns of Wellingrove, Armidale, Tenterfield, Walcha and Kempsey.

In 1856 the unicameral Legislative Council was abolished and replaced with an elected Legislative Assembly and an appointed Legislative Council. The district was represented by the Legislative Assembly electorate of New England and Macleay.

== Members ==
Member	Term
Matthew Marsh	Sep 1851 – Mar 1855
Robert Massie	May 1855 – Jul 1855
Thomas Rusden	Aug 1855 – Feb 1856

Thomas Rusden went on to represent New England and Macleay in the Legislative Assembly from 1856.

== Election results ==
=== 1851 ===
1851 New South Wales colonial election, 20 September: Pastoral Districts of New England and Macleay
Candidate	Votes	%
Matthew Henry Marsh	unopposed	

=== 1855 (1) ===
Matthew Marsh resigned in March 1855.

New England and Macleay by-election 26 April 1855
Candidate	Votes	%
Robert Massie	64	54.24
Richard Jones	54	45.76
Total votes	118	100.00

=== 1855 (2) ===
The election of Robert Massie was declared void.

New England and Macleay by-election 27 August 1855
Candidate	Votes	%
Thomas Rusden	58	59.18
Robert Massie	40	40.82
Total votes	98	100.00
