= Rick Colless =

Australian politician

Member of Legislative Council of New South Wales
- In office 30 August 2000 – 23 March 2019

Deputy Opposition Whip in the Legislative Council
- Incumbent
- Assumed office 27 August 2002
- Preceded by: Richard Bull

Personal details
- Born: 12 November 1952 (age 73) Tamworth, New South Wales
- Party: The Nationals
- Spouse: Geraldine Faith Barton (nee Porter)
- Children: 3

Richard Hargrave Colless (born 12 November 1952) is an Australian politician. Colless was a member of the New South Wales Legislative Council from 2000 to 2019, representing the National Party.

== Early years and background ==
Colless was born in Tamworth to Kenneth Hargrave Colless and Yvonne Tipling and was raised on a rural property at Bundarra, near Inverell. He undertook primary school by correspondence from the Blackfriars Correspondence School in Sydney; and secondary education at Tamworth and Singleton High Schools. Colless won a cadetship with the Soil Conservation Service of the New South Wales, that led to studies at Hawkesbury Agricultural College. Working for the Soil Conservation Service for the next 26 years, he worked in various country towns including Henty, Cowra, Goulburn, Gunnedah and Inverell where he settled in 1987.

In 1991, he was elected to Inverell Shire Council and served three terms as a councillor and became its mayor in 1999.

He became the Chairman of the Inverell Branch of the National Party of Australia in 1996 and served in that role until 1999. He became Chairman of the New England Electorate Council in 1999 and served a term during 2000 on the Central Executive of the National Party.

== Parliamentary career ==
He was appointed to the Legislative Council on 30 August 2000 following the resignation of the National Party MLC Richard Bull. He was reelected in the 2007 and 2011 NSW elections.

Colless served as Chief Whip for The Nationals in the Upper House from 2002 until 2015, chaired the Standing Committee on State Development from 2011 to 2015 and was appointed as the Parliamentary Secretary for Natural Resources and Regional Planning from March 2015. He has also served on a number of other committees during his parliamentary term.

== Personal information ==
Colless's great great grandfather Richard Hargrave, and his great, great uncle John Fletcher Hargrave, both served in the New South Wales Parliament. Richard Hargrave came to New South Wales in 1838 aboard the sailing ship Argyle. Hargrave was elected as the first member for New England and Macleay in the first Legislative Assembly of New South Wales. Hargrave's older brother, John Fletcher Hargrave QC, arrived in New South Wales in 1856 and served in the Legislative Council from 1859 until 1861. John Hargrave was also appointed as a Representative of Government in the Legislative Council and served as Solicitor-General and Attorney-General until 1865.

In 1976, Colless married Toni Christine Brown, and together they have three children. They divorced in 2010 and in 2012 Colless married Geraldine Barton (née Porter).
