= William Tydd Taylor =

Scottish-born Australian politician

William Tydd Taylor (1814 – 1 December 1862) was a Scottish-born Australian politician.

He was the son of gentleman John Taylor and Harriet Bunbury, and migrated to New South Wales around 1840. Around 1839 he had married Margaretta Lucy Lind, with whom he had ten children. He worked as a carrier between the North Coast and Northern Tablelands, subsequently acquiring the "Terrible Vale" property near Armidale. In 1858 he was elected to the New South Wales Legislative Assembly for New England and Macleay, but he did not re-contest in 1859. Taylor died at Terrible Vale in 1862.

New South Wales Legislative Assembly
Preceded by Richard Hargrave; Thomas Rusden	Member for New England and Macleay; 1858–1859; Served alongside: Abram Moriarty/James Hart	Abolished
