= Electoral district of New England and Macleay =

Former state electoral district of New South Wales, Australia

New England and Macleay was an electoral district of the Legislative Assembly in the Australian state of New South Wales from 1856 to 1859, in the Northern Tablelands region of New England and part of the Mid North Coast region, including the area to the north of the Macleay River. but excluding the area south of the Macleay River which was included in the Counties of Gloucester and Macquarie. To the north was the electorate of Clarence and Darling Downs and to the west the electorate of Liverpool Plains and Gwydir. It elected two members, with voters casting two votes and the first two candidates being elected. It was partly replaced by New England.

== Members for New England and Macleay ==
Member	Party	Period	Member	Party	Period
Richard Hargrave	None	1856–1857	Thomas Rusden	None	1856–1857
William Taylor	None	1858–1859	Abram Moriarty	None	1858–1858
William Taylor	None	1858–1859	James Hart	None	1858–1859

== Election results ==
=== 1856 ===
1856 New South Wales colonial election: New England and Macleay
Candidate	Votes	%
Thomas Rusden (elected 1)	181	46.9
Richard Hargrave (elected 2)	162	42.0
John Dickson	43	11.1
Total formal votes	386	100.0
Informal votes	0	0.0
Turnout	193	41.87

Polling was conducted on 17 April 1856. Rusden had represented Pastoral Districts of New England and Macleay in the old Legislative Council.

=== 1858 ===
1858 New South Wales colonial election: New England and Macleay 11 February
Candidate	Votes	%
Abram Moriarty (elected 1)	179	42.4
William Taylor (elected 2)	136	32.2
Thomas Rusden (defeated)	107	25.4
Total formal votes	422	100.0
Informal votes	0	0.0
Turnout	422	35.52

The former member Thomas Rusden unsuccessfully petitioned against the election of Moriaty.

=== 1858 by-election ===
1858 New England and Macleay by-election Friday 26 November
Candidate	Votes	%
James Hart (elected)	show of hands	
Thomas Rusden		
John Williams		

The by-election was caused by the resignation of Abram Moriarty. Neither candidate called for a poll.
