= Robert George Massie =

Australian politician

Robert Massie
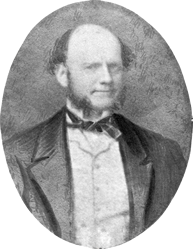

Member of the Queensland Legislative Council
- In office 1 May 1860 – 14 May 1862

Personal details
- Born: Robert George Massie; 1815 Eccleston, Cheshire, England
- Died: 13 September 1883 (aged 67–68) Hunters Hill, New South Wales, Australia
- Spouse: Annette Brown (m.1854)
- Relations: Hugh Massie (son)
- Occupation: Station owner

Robert George Massie (1815 – 13 September 1883) was a Member of the Queensland Legislative Council.

== Career ==
Massie was a Commissioner of Crown Lands for the MacLeay River District in New South Wales from 4 July 1842 to 1 March 1848. Massie was appointed as Commissioner of Crown Lands for New England on 22 April 1848 and then he additionally acquired responsibility for MacLeay River on 25 January 1854. Massie ceased in the role on 7 December 1854.

He then moved to the Darling Downs in Queensland where he operated a pastoral station called Toolburra.

From 1 May 1855 to 31 July 1855, he served as an elected member of the New South Wales Legislative Council for the Pastoral districts of New England and MacLeay. However, his election was declared void.

Massie was appointed to the Queensland Legislative Council on 1 May 1860 and served until his resignation on 14 May 1862.

He died on 13 September 1883 at Hunters Hill, New South Wales.

== Legacy ==
The Massie railway station and locality of Massie both near Toolburra in the Southern Downs Region of Queensland are named after him.

New South Wales Legislative Council
Preceded by Matthew Marsh	Member for New England and Macleay; May 1855 – Jul 1855	Succeeded by Thomas Rusden
