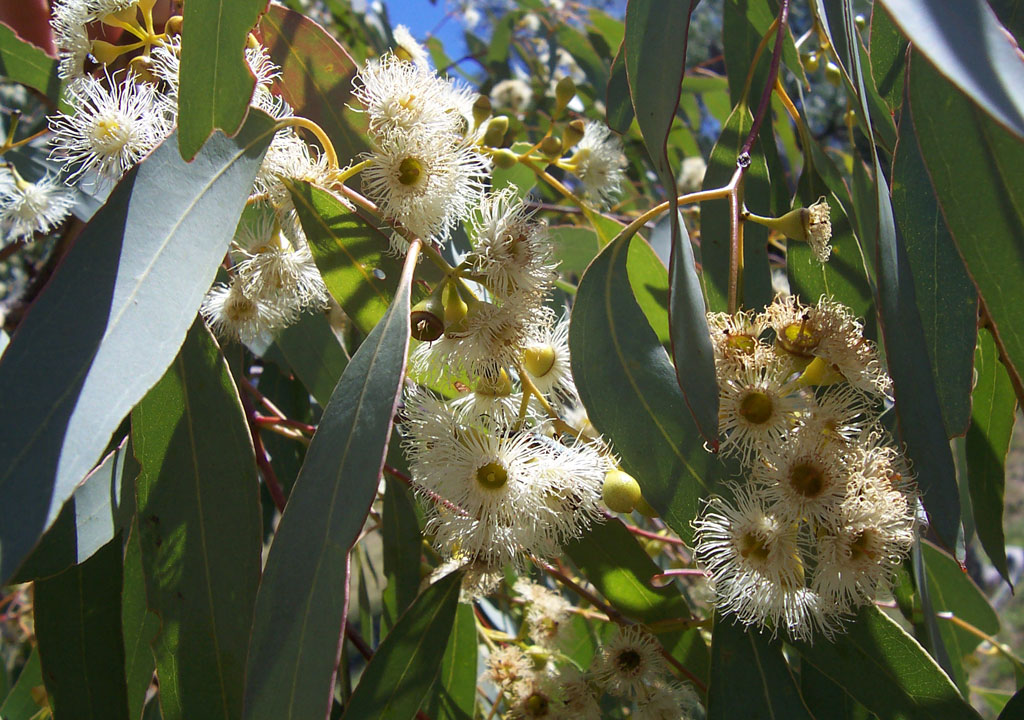
- Eucalyptus melliodora, flowers & leaves

Conservation status
- Vulnerable (IUCN 3.1)

Scientific classification
- Kingdom: Plantae
- Clade: Tracheophytes
- Clade: Angiosperms
- Clade: Eudicots
- Clade: Rosids
- Order: Myrtales
- Family: Myrtaceae
- Genus: Eucalyptus
- Species: E. melliodora

Binomial name
- Eucalyptus melliodora A.Cunn. ex Schauer
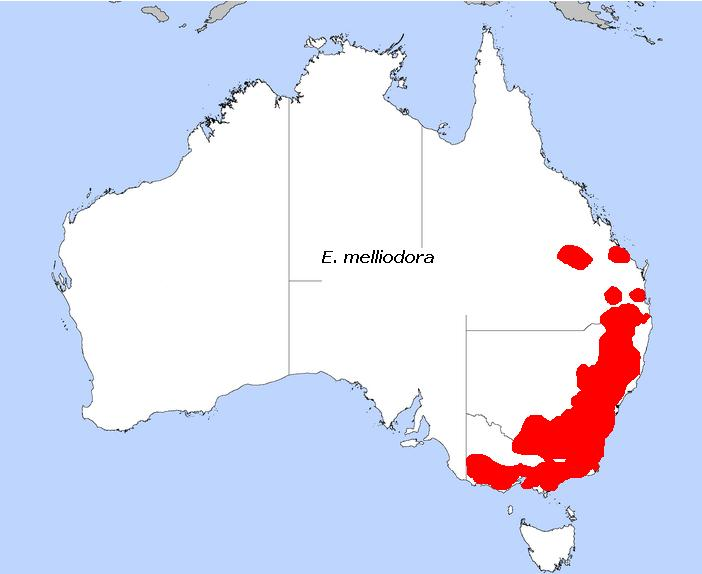
- E. melliodora, field distribution

= Eucalyptus melliodora =

Yellow box

Species of eucalyptus

Eucalyptus melliodora, commonly known as yellow box, honey box or yellow ironbox, is a species of medium-sized to occasionally tall tree that is endemic to south-eastern, continental Australia. It has rough, flaky or fibrous bark on part or all of the trunk, smooth greyish to yellowish bark above. The adult leaves are lance-shaped to egg-shaped, the flower buds are arranged in groups of seven and the fruit is more or less hemispherical.

== Description ==
Eucalyptus melliodora is a tree that typically grows to a height of 30 m (98 ft) and forms a lignotuber. The bark is variable ranging from smooth with an irregular, short stocking, to covering most of the trunk, fibrous, dense or loosely held, grey, yellow or red-brown, occasionally very coarse, thick, dark brown to black. The smooth bark above is shed from the upper limbs to leave a smooth, white or yellowish surface. Young plants and coppice regrowth have lance-shaped to elliptic leaves that are 25–65 mm (0.98–2.56 in) long and 9–35 mm (0.35–1.38 in) wide and petiolate. Adult leaves are the same dull light green or slate grey on both surfaces, lance-shaped to egg-shaped, 60–140 mm (2.4–5.5 in) long and 8–30 mm (0.31–1.18 in) wide on a petiole 8–20 mm (0.31–0.79 in) long. The vein on the leaf margin of both adult and juvenile leaves is markedly distant from the leaf margin.

The flower buds are arranged in groups of seven on an unbranched peduncle 3–10 mm (0.12–0.39 in) long, the individual buds on pedicels 2–10 mm (0.079–0.394 in) long. Mature buds are club-shaped, oval or diamond-shaped, 4–8 mm (0.16–0.31 in) long and 3–5 mm (0.12–0.20 in) wide with a conical to rounded operculum. Flowering has been recorded in most months and the flowers are white. The fruit is a woody, hemispherical to shortened spherical capsule 3–8 mm (0.12–0.31 in) long and 3–7 mm (0.12–0.28 in) wide with the fruit near or below rim level.

== Taxonomy and naming ==
Eucalyptus melliodora was first formally described in 1843 by Johannes Conrad Schauer from an unpublished description by Allan Cunningham and the description was published in Walpers' book Repertorium Botanices Systematicae. The specific epithet (melliodora) is derived from the Latin words melleus meaning "honey" and odorus "scented". There a number of common names applied to E. melliodora including: Yellow Box, Yellow Ironbox, Yellow Jacket, Yellow Ironbark, Dargan, Honey Box and Honey-scented Gum as detailed in the Australian National Species List.

== Distribution and habitat ==
Yellow box is widely distributed on the eastern plains and tablelands from western Victoria, New South Wales and up from the capital territory to south-central Queensland.

== Ecology ==
It is associated with inland grey box, fuzzy box (E. conica), white box (E. albens), pilliga grey box (E. pilligaensis), red ironbark (E. sideroxylon), narrow-leaved ironbark (E. crebra), Blakely's red gum (E. blakelyi), apple species (Angophora), black cypress (Callitris endlicheri), white cypress (Callitris glaucophylla), kurrajong (Brachychiton populneus) and wattles (Acacia) species.

== Uses ==
Eucalyptus melliodora provides good firewood and durable timber. The honey produced from it is renowned for its quality.

== Notable specimens ==
One of the few trees to survive the blast from the 6 August 1945 atomic bombing of Hiroshima Japan, was an E. melliodora. The tree was located 740 m (2,430 ft) from the hypocenter, and as of April 2019 was still standing.

== Gallery ==
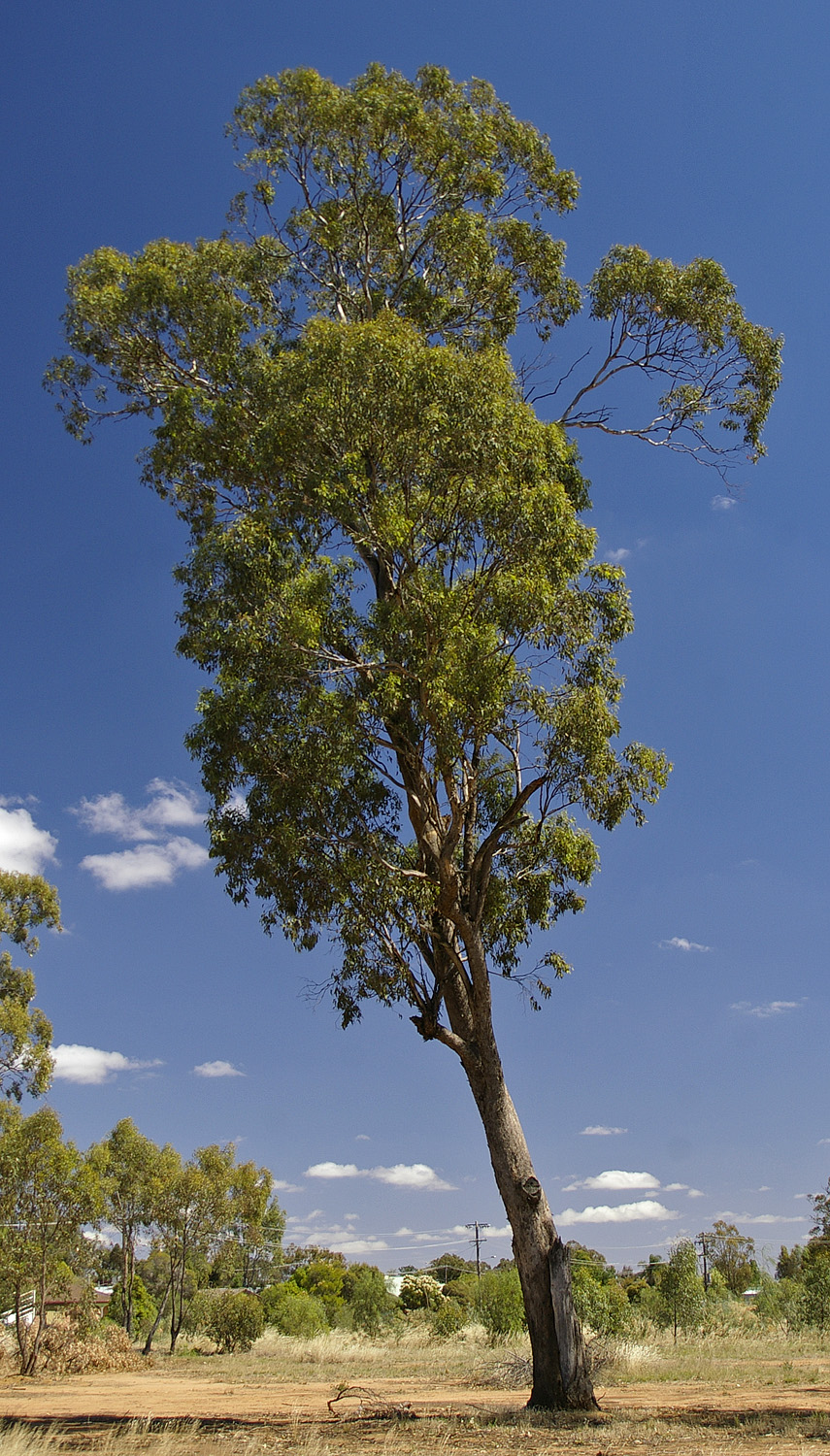
E. melliodora in Wagga Wagga

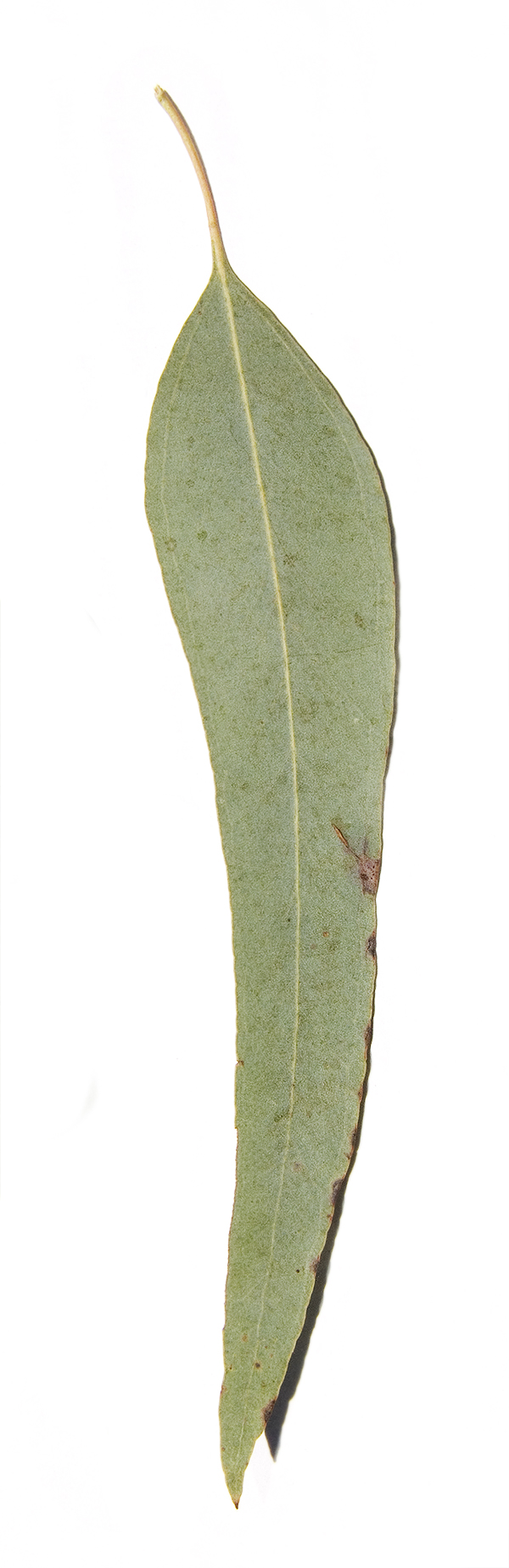
Leaf

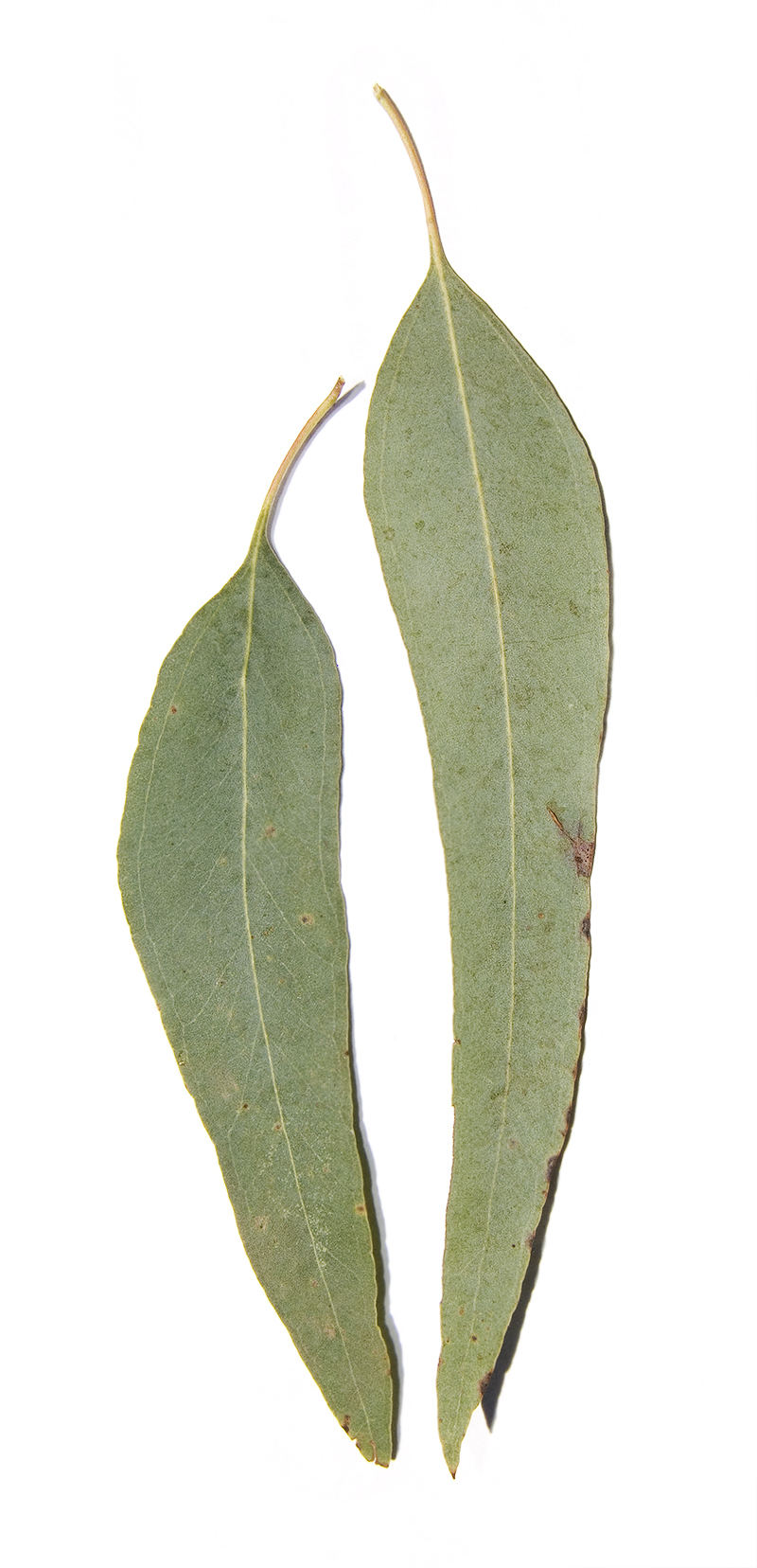
Leaves

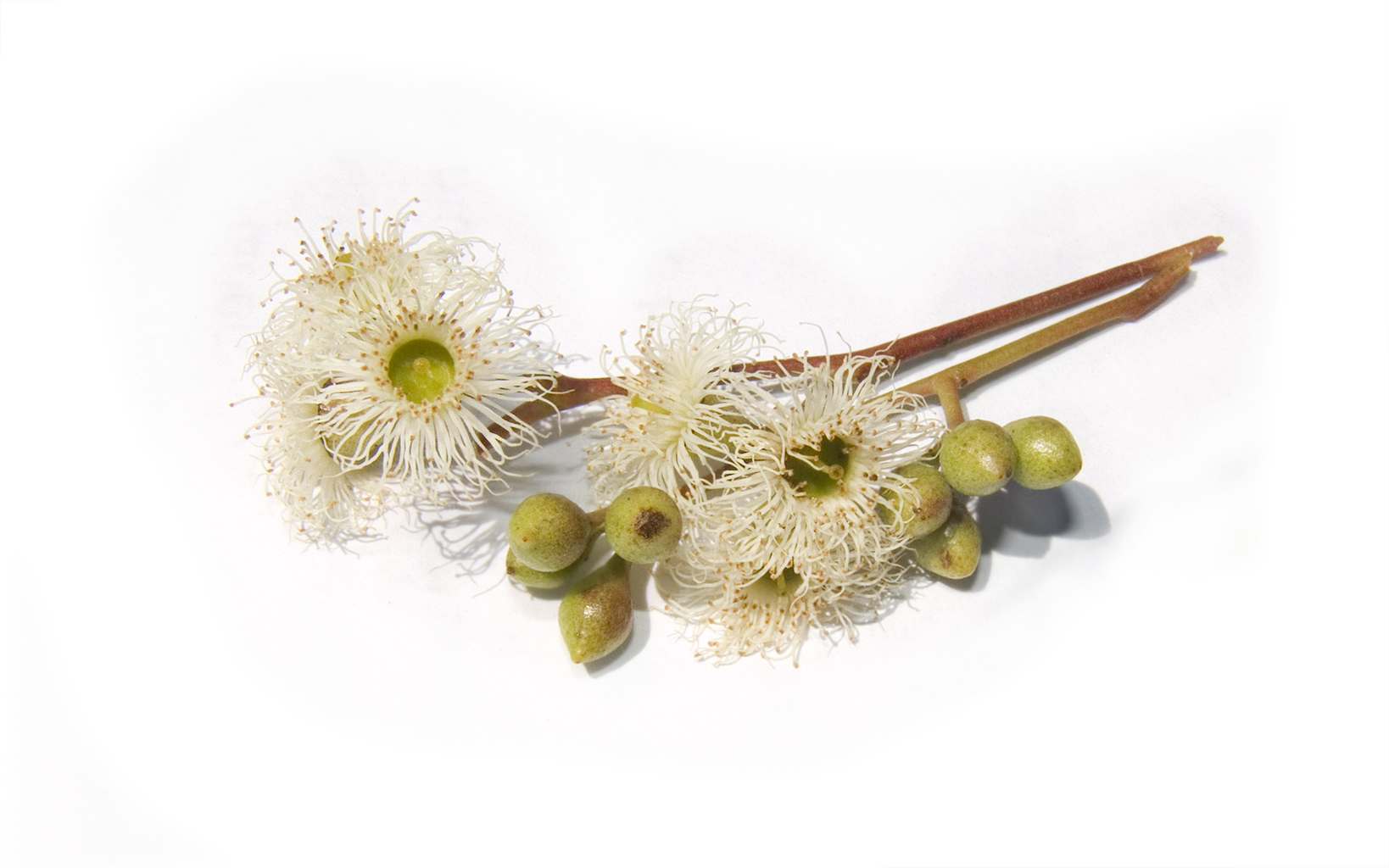
Flowers and flower buds

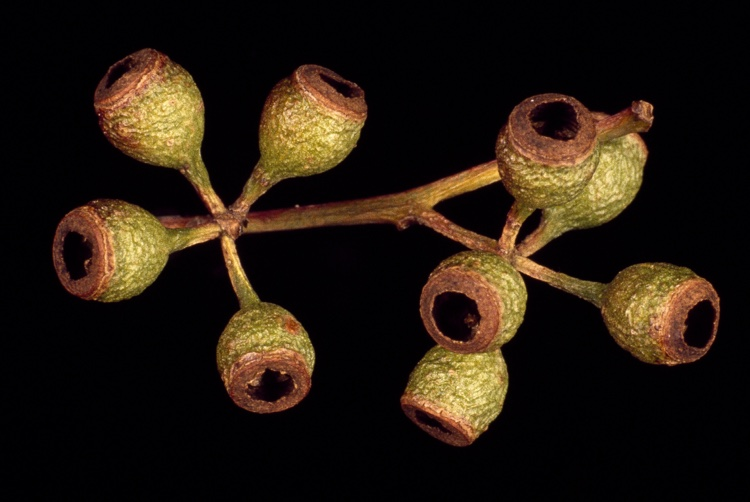
Fruit

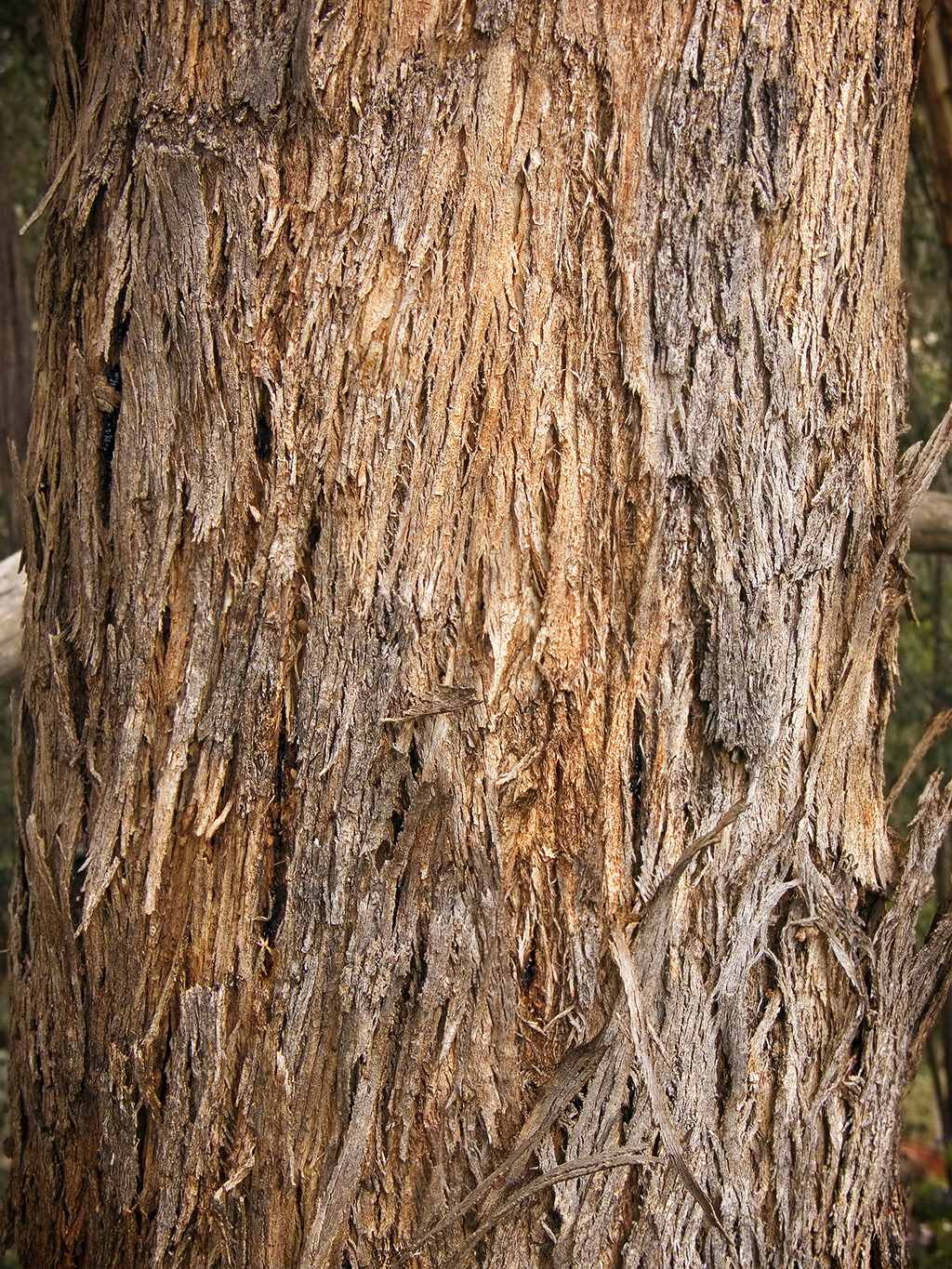
Trunk detail

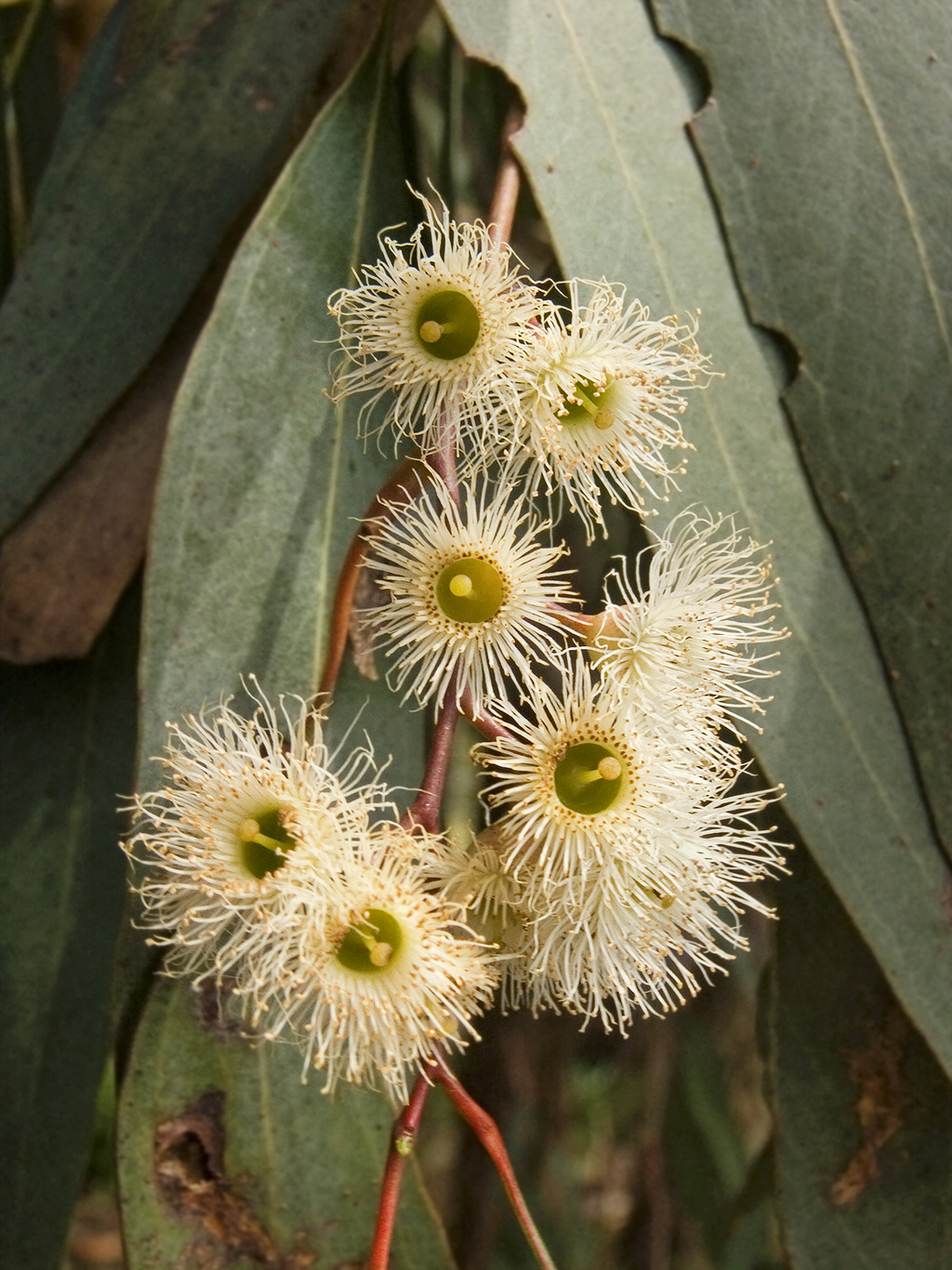
Flowers
