= Thomas Rusden =

Australian politician

Personal details
- Born: 1817 Dorking, Surrey, England
- Died: 30 June 1882 (aged 64–65) Glen Innes, New South Wales

Thomas George Rusden (1817 – 30 June 1882) was a squatter and politician in colonial New South Wales. He was a member of the Legislative Council between 1855 and 1856 and a member of the Legislative Assembly for one term between 1856 and 1857.

== Early life ==
Rusden was born in Dorking, probably around 1817. (Note: Rusden's parliamentary biography gives his birth year as 1817, while his obituary reported him as aged 76, which would mean he was born in 1805 or 1806. His brother Francis Rusden, described as the eldest child, was born in 1811.) He was the son of an Anglican clergyman who migrated to New South Wales and was appointed to a chaplaincy in Maitland in 1835. After a liberal education under his father's tutorship, Rusden squatted in the New England district and by 1844 he had acquired substantial property including 60,000 acres of pastoral land in the Shannon Vale area near Glen Innes. His nine siblings included Francis Rusden, who was also a pastoralist and member of the Legislative Assembly, the historian George Rusden and the polemicist and noted public servant Henry Rusden.

== Colonial Parliament ==
In 1855, prior to the establishment of responsible self-government, Rusden was elected to the Legislative Council for the Pastoral Districts of New England and Macleay. He represented the electorate until the granting of responsible self-government in 1856. Subsequently, at the first election under the new constitution he was elected as one of the two members for the same district in the Legislative Assembly. Rusden was defeated at the next election in 1858. He did not hold a ministerial or parliamentary position.

He lodged multiple petitions against the election, however these did not comply with the requirements of the Electoral Act. The first, properly addressed to the Governor, had not been accompanied by the £100 deposit. The second and third petition were addressed to the Speaker and were outside the 4 week time limit, although each was accompanied by the required deposit. The Legislative Assembly gave Rusden the opportunity to address it, before rejecting his petitions. Abram Moriarty resigned as the member for New England and Macleay on 13 October 1858.

On 15 October he attempted to take a seat in the assembly, but was ejected by the sergeant-at-arms. Rusden stated he was unable to nominate himself for the seat at the by-election, asserting he was already the member. Rusden was nominated at the by-election, however the show of hands was in favour of James Hart and Rusden's supporters did not call for a poll.

The district of New England and Macleay was abolished in 1859, partly replaced by New England and Rusden was a candidate at the 1859 election, defeated by Hart by a mere two votes. Four people were charged with impersonating electors and a petition was lodged against the election. The Elections and Qualifications Committee conducted a re-count. This was not a secret ballot and the 4 votes by the impersonators were identified as being for Hart and were rejected. The committee also rejected 3 votes for Rusden, but allowed 2 votes for Hart that had previously been considered invalid, with the result that it upheld the election of Hart, with a margin of 3 votes.

Rusden was unsuccessful in three further attempts to regain a seat.

== Later life and death ==
Rusden's obituary noted that he was "reported to be a wealthy man, and in addition to Shannon Vale he owned nearly half of Glen Innes; but of late his affairs became complicated, and a short time since all his property went into other hands, and he ended his days in utter penury". He died at Glenn Innes on 30 June 1882 (aged 64–65).

== Notes ==
New South Wales Legislative Council
Preceded by Robert Massie	Member for New England and Macleay; 1855 – 1856	Council replaced
New South Wales Legislative Assembly
New parliament	Member for New England and Macleay; 1856 – 1858; Served alongside: Hargrave	Succeeded by Abram Moriarty; William Taylor
