= Matthew Henry Marsh =

Australian politician (1810–1881)

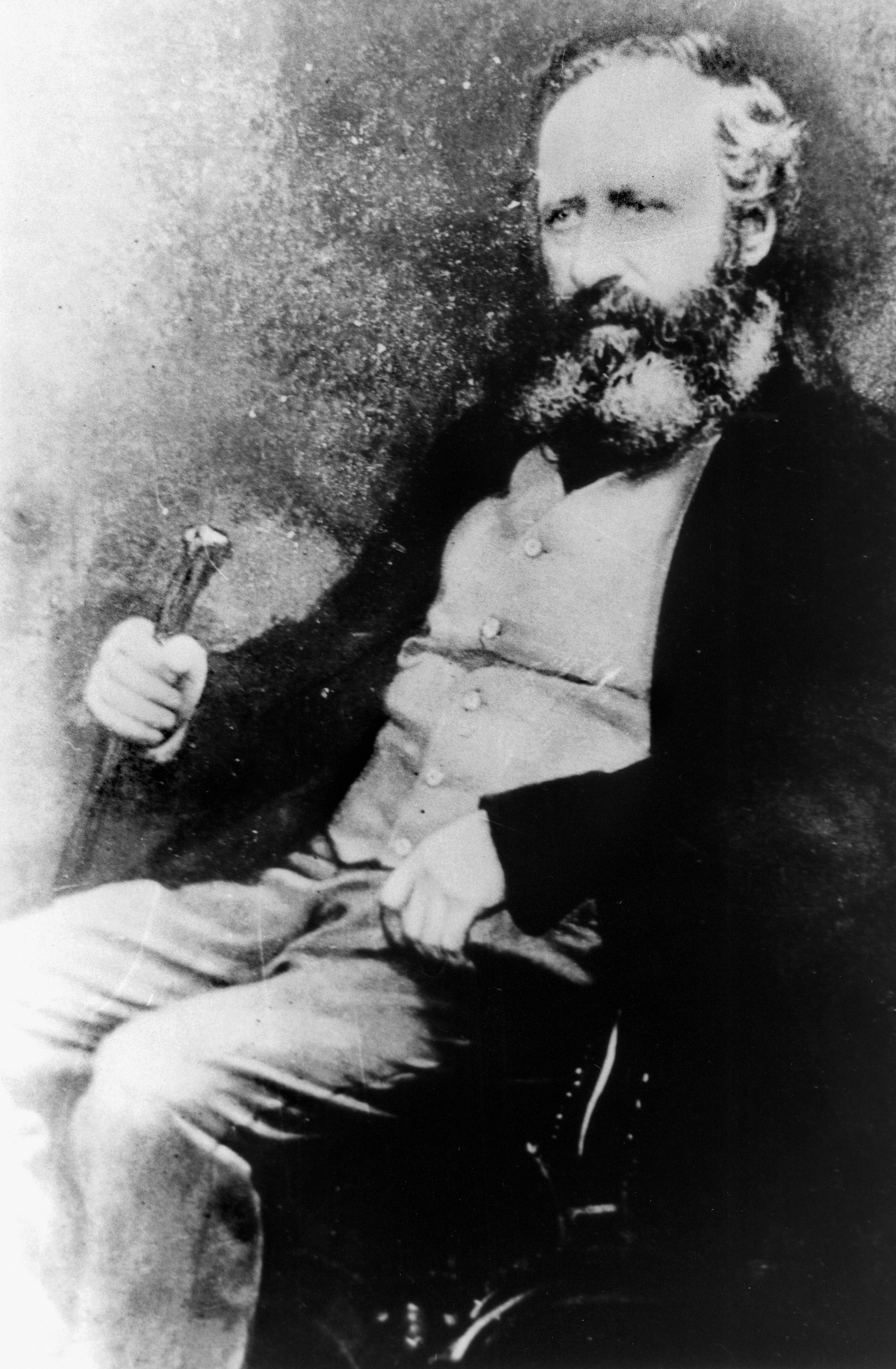
Matthew Henry Marsh

Matthew Henry Marsh (1810—1881) was a politician in Great Britain and New South Wales and a Queensland pioneer pastoralist.

== Early life ==
Matthew Henry Marsh was born on 10 September 1810 in Salisbury, England, the son of the Rev Matthew Marsh, the Canon of Salisbury Cathedral and his wife Margaret (née Brodie). He attended Westminster School. He obtained a Bachelor of Arts in 1833 and a Master of Arts in 1835 from Christ Church College of Oxford University. He was called to the bar of the Inner Temple in 1836, after which he was a barrister on the Western Circuit and at the Wiltshire Assizes.

However, he did not have a very successful practice as a barrister and so on the advice of his uncle he emigrated to New South Wales. On 24 June 1840, he sailed to Sydney on the Broxbournebury arriving on 24 September. There he purchased a 340,000 acre pastoral run in New England which he called Salisbury Plains, a 175,000 acre run called Boorolong, and a 200,000 acre run called Maryland on the Darling Downs (then part of New South Wales, but subsequently part of Queensland).

Leaving his pastoral properties under the management of his brother Charles, Marsh returned to England, where he married Eliza Mary Ann Merewether on 25 July 1844 in Calne, Wiltshire, England. On returning to New South Wales with his bride, in 1845 they built a large homestead called Salisbury Court at Salisbury Plains (now at 3031 Thunderbolts Way, Salisbury Plains, listed on the Uralla Shire local heritage register).

== Politics ==
Marsh was elected to the New South Wales Legislative Council 1 September 1851 to 31 March 1855 for the Pastoral Districts of New England and Macleay, where he was a strong advocate of establishing a separate colony in Northern Australia (which would include the New England and Darling Downs districts where his pastoral assets were located).

In 1855, he returned to England, where he was elected in 1857 to the House of Commons as the representative for Salisbury, where he continued to advocate for the new colony. He was successful in that the separation of Queensland occurred in 1859. However, he was personally disappointed that Queensland's southern boundary was further north than he wished, leaving New England part of New South Wales while the Darling Downs became part of Queensland.

In 1865, he returned to Australia between June and December. In Brisbane, his role in achieving separation was celebrated with a banquet in his honour on 11 September. He published an account of his journey in 1867.

He retired from the British Parliament in 1868. A year later, the 1869 Salisbury by-election gave Marsh a chance to return to the House of Commons. This time he stood as a member of the Adullamites. However, Marsh only got 84 of the 1,212 votes, ending his political career for good.

== Later life ==
Marsh became a magistrate in Hampshire and a deputy-lieutenant in Wiltshire. He became a Fellow of the Royal Geographical Society.

He made another visit to his Australian properties in 1873.

Marsh died on 26 January 1881 in Bournemouth, England.

== Published works ==
- Matthew Henry Marsh (1859), A letter to the colonists of Queensland
- Matthew Henry Marsh (1867), Overland from Southampton to Queensland, London E. Stanford — available at the Open Library

New South Wales Legislative Council
New district	Member for New England and Macleay; 1851 – 1855	Succeeded by Robert Massie
