= Richard Hargrave =

Australian politician

Member of the New South Wales Legislative Assembly for New England and Macleay
- In office 17 April 1856 – 19 December 1857

Personal details
- Born: 1 February 1817 Greenwich, England
- Died: 19 January 1905 (aged 87) Armidale, New South Wales

Richard Hargrave (1 February 1817 – 19 January 1905) was an Australian politician and a pastoralist.

Hargrave was born to Joshua Hargrave and Sarah Hargrave (née Lee) on 1 February 1817 at Greenwich, England. His father was a hardware merchant.

He arrived in Sydney in 1838 on board the Argyle and went to work on Combelong Station at Monaro for Messrs Hughes and Hosking. The following year he became a partner of the Callendoon Station and the Goondiwini Stations on the Macintyre River. He founded Beeboo and Whylm on the Severn River. In 1843, he lost everything along with his partners following the financial collapse of the New South Wales economy in that year. His merchant father refinanced Hargrave and he was able to purchase 21,000 acres (85 km^{2}) at Armidale which he named "Hillgrove Station". He also acquired leases for Bostobrick and Tyringham and Hernani in New England. He was said to be involved in much conflict with the local Aboriginal population. He married Mary William on 16 February 1847 at Sydney. They had six sons and one daughter.

Was a member for New England and Macleay from 17 April 1856 to 19 December 1857 in the first New South Wales Legislative Assembly. During his time as a member he was a member of the following committees:

- Elections and Qualifications Committee
- Impounding Laws Committee
- Australian Trust Company's Bill Committee
- Petition of Mr David Cross Committee
- Elections and Qualifications Committee
- Reclaiming Land, Woolloomooloo Bay Committee
- Secondary Punishment Committee
- Scab and Catarrh in Sheep Committee
- Australian Gas Company's Light Bill Committee

After politics, he and his wife retired to Armidale and moved into a cottage near the railway station. The street where they lived is now named Hargrave Street after them. He died at Armidale on 19 January 1905, the final surviving member of the first Legislative Assembly.

His brother John Hargrave also served in the New South Wales Parliament after arriving in New South Wales in 1857. His brother went on to become Solicitor-General, Attorney General and a judge of the Supreme Court of New South Wales. His nephew Lawrence Hargrave was the inventor of the box or cellular kite. Hargrave's great, grandson Rick Colless was a member of the Legislative Council.

New South Wales Legislative Assembly
New assembly	Member for New England and Macleay; 1856 – 1857; With: Thomas Rusden	Succeeded by Abram Moriarty; William Taylor
