= Abram Moriarty =

Australian politician (1830–1918)

Abram Orpen Moriarty
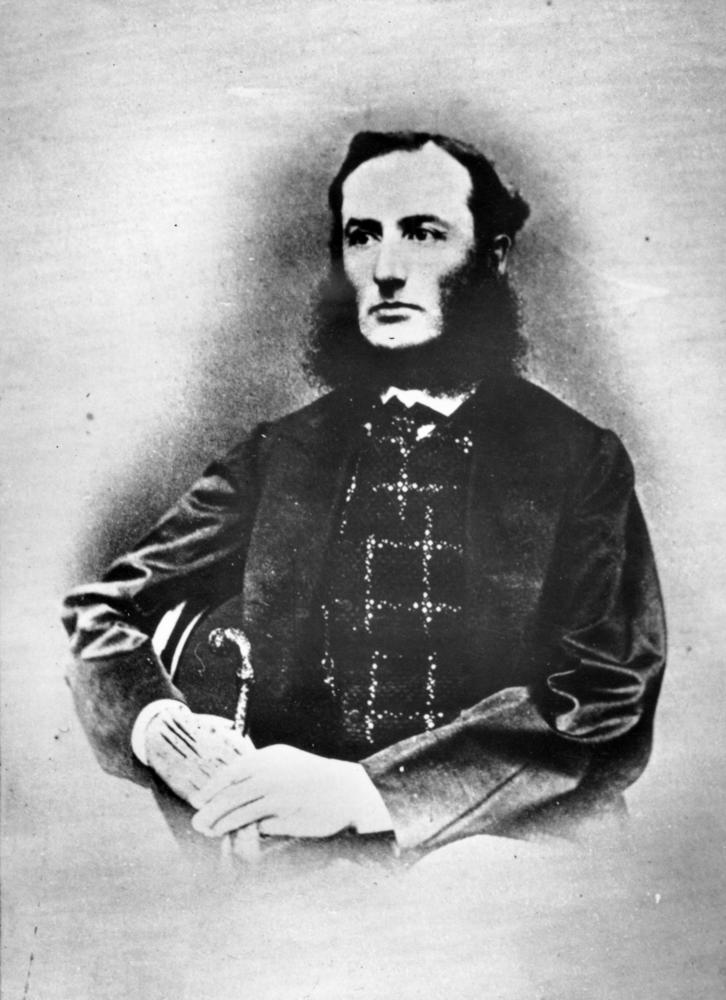
- Born: 1830; County Cork, Ireland
- Died: 22 May 1918 (aged 88); Goulburn, New South Wales
- Education: Trinity College Dublin
- Spouse: Harriett Christiana Powell (1856-1893)
- Parent(s): Merion Marshall Moriarty; Annie Orpen
- Engineering career
- Discipline: politician

Abram Orpen Moriarty (1830 – 22 May 1918) was an Irish-born Australian politician.

== Early life ==
Moriarty was born in County Cork to Merion Marshall Moriarty and Anne née Orpen. The family migrated to Sydney in 1843 and he became a clerk in the Department of Lands and then a police magistrate at Armidale. On 24 April 1856 he married Harriett Christiana Powell, with whom he had thirteen children. He had been employed in the civil service since he was 16, rising to chief clerk in the Department of Lands in 1853, appointed commissioner of crown lands and a police magistrate in Armidale in 1857.

== Political career ==
In February 1858 he was elected to the New South Wales Legislative Assembly for New England and Macleay, defeating the sitting member Thomas Rusden. Rusden lodged multiple petitions against the election, making various allegations including electoral fraud, corruption and that Moriarty was ineligible to be elected as he was a police magistrate at the time of his election. Each of these petitions were rejected by the house as not complying with the requirements of the Electoral Act.

Moriarty resigned on 13 October 1858, denying the petitions played any part in his reasons, instead citing the financial difficulty of serving a far distant electorate.

He attempted to return to the Legislative Assembly at the 1872 election for the district of Monara, but was comfortably defeated.

== Civil service ==
A month after resigning from parliament, he was appointed acting clerk of the Executive Council of New South Wales. He did not serve long in this role, almost immediately becoming private secretary to Sir George Bowen, the 1st Governor of Queensland and accompanying him to Brisbane, becoming the clerk to the Executive Council of Queensland.

Moriarty returned to Sydney in September 1860 and was appointed chief commissioner for crown lands. He was an ensign in the volunteer rifles, promoted to lieutenant in 1868. He was promoted to under-secretary for lands in January 1870, although the promotion did not carry any extra remuneration. He was also promoted in the volunteer rifles to the rank of captain in May 1870. The following month however an inspector of public accounts reported that as chief commissioner for crown lands he had not been maintaining proper accounts nor a separate bank account. The money was instead paid into Moriarty's bank account and he was subsequently suspected of applying £771 to his private use in the months between receipt and payment into treasury. Moriarty's remuneration at the time was £800 per year. The matter was investigated in July and Moriarty was suspended on 1 August 1870. The government was not satisfied with Moriarty's response and he was dismissed on 6 September.

In May 1872 Sir Alfred Stephen appointed Moriarty to be his private secretary, and Aide-de-Camp. Sir Alfred encouraged Henry Parkes to reinstate Moriarty to the civil service and Moriarty was appointed chief clerk in the Department of Lands, the position he had last held in 1857. He was later chairman of the Goulburn Land Board from 1885. In 1888 Parkes declined Moriarty's pleas to be re-appointed to the vacant office of Under Secretary for Lands.

Moriarty retired in 1896 and died at Goulburn on 22 May 1918 (aged 88).

New South Wales Legislative Assembly
Preceded by Richard Hargrave; Thomas Rusden	Member for New England and Macleay; 1858; Served alongside: William Taylor	Succeeded by James Hart
