= John Williams (New South Wales colonial politician) =

Australian politician

John Williams (18 February 1821 – 20 October 1891) was a Crown Solicitor, politician and mayor in colonial New South Wales.

== Early life ==
Williams was born on 18 February 1821 in Liverpool, England, the son of John W Williams. Williams arrived in Sydney with his family at an early age and was educated in the colony. In 1848 at St James Church of England in Sydney, he married Mary Elizabeth Green. They had at least three sons and two daughters.

== Initial career ==
Williams was articled to George Nichols and was admitted to practice as a solicitor in the Supreme Court on 16 May 1842. In February 1844 he was in practice in Macquarie Street and was gazetted to practice in the Court of Requests. He was for a time in partnership with Richard Driver, who was another of Nichols's proteges. One of Williams's articled clerks was James Martin, who went on to become Chief Justice and Premier of New South Wales.

== Politics ==
He was a member of Sydney City Council from 1849 to 1853 and from 1857 to 1861, and served as mayor in 1858. He unsuccessfully stood as a candidate at the 1858 by-election for New England and Macleay. In May 1861 he was one of Charles Cowper's 21 appointments to the Legislative Council on the day before the five year terms ended, but the adjournment of the council meant that he never took his seat.

== Crown solicitor ==
He was Crown Solicitor from 1 June 1859, until 8 October 1891. He was a founding councillor of the Law Institute of 1862 and first president of the Incorporated Law Institute, holding office from 1884 to 1891. On 1 January 1885 he was appointed to the five-member Civil Service Board and was appointed chairman in 1889.

From 1863, Williams had offices in William Street East, while his residence was Kurraghein, at 66 Bayswater Road, Darlinghurst.

== Death ==
Williams died in Sydney on 20 October 1891 (aged 70) and was buried in the family vault in the old Church of England section of Rookwood Cemetery.

Civic offices
Preceded by George Thornton	Mayor of Sydney; 1858	Succeeded by George Smith
Legal offices
Preceded by John Dillon; William Billyard	Crown Solicitor for New South Wales; 1859 – 1891	Succeeded by Ernest Smith
