= Northern Tablelands =

- Region
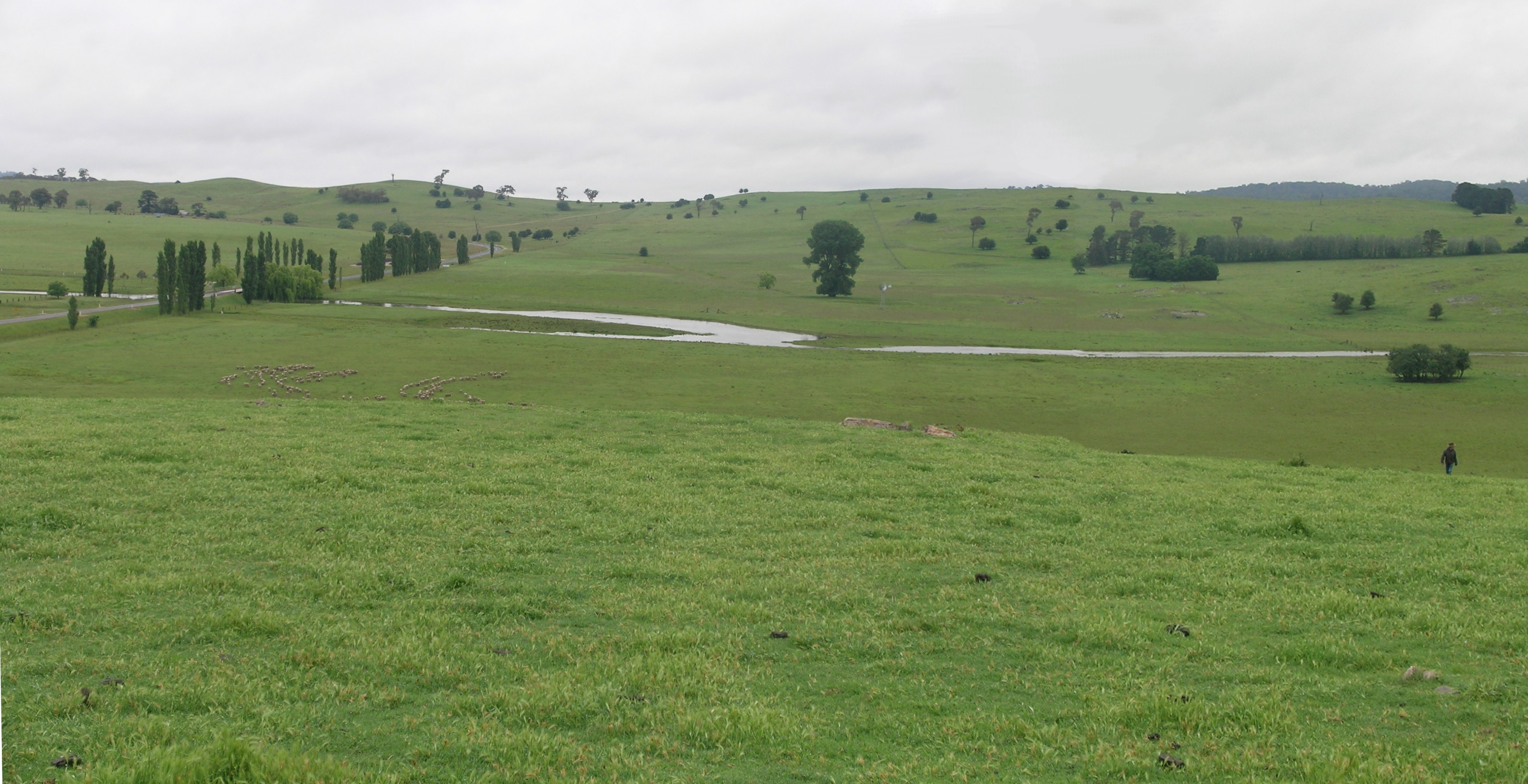
- Livestock grazing country, Irish Town, Walcha.
- Country: Australia
- State: New South Wales
- LGAs: Armidale; Inverell; Uralla; Walcha

Government
  - State electorates: Northern Tablelands; Lismore; Tamworth
  - Federal division: New England
Regions around Northern Tablelands
South Downs	South Downs	Northern Rivers
New England	Northern Tablelands	Northern Rivers
Central Tablelands	Upper Hunter Valley	Mid North Coast

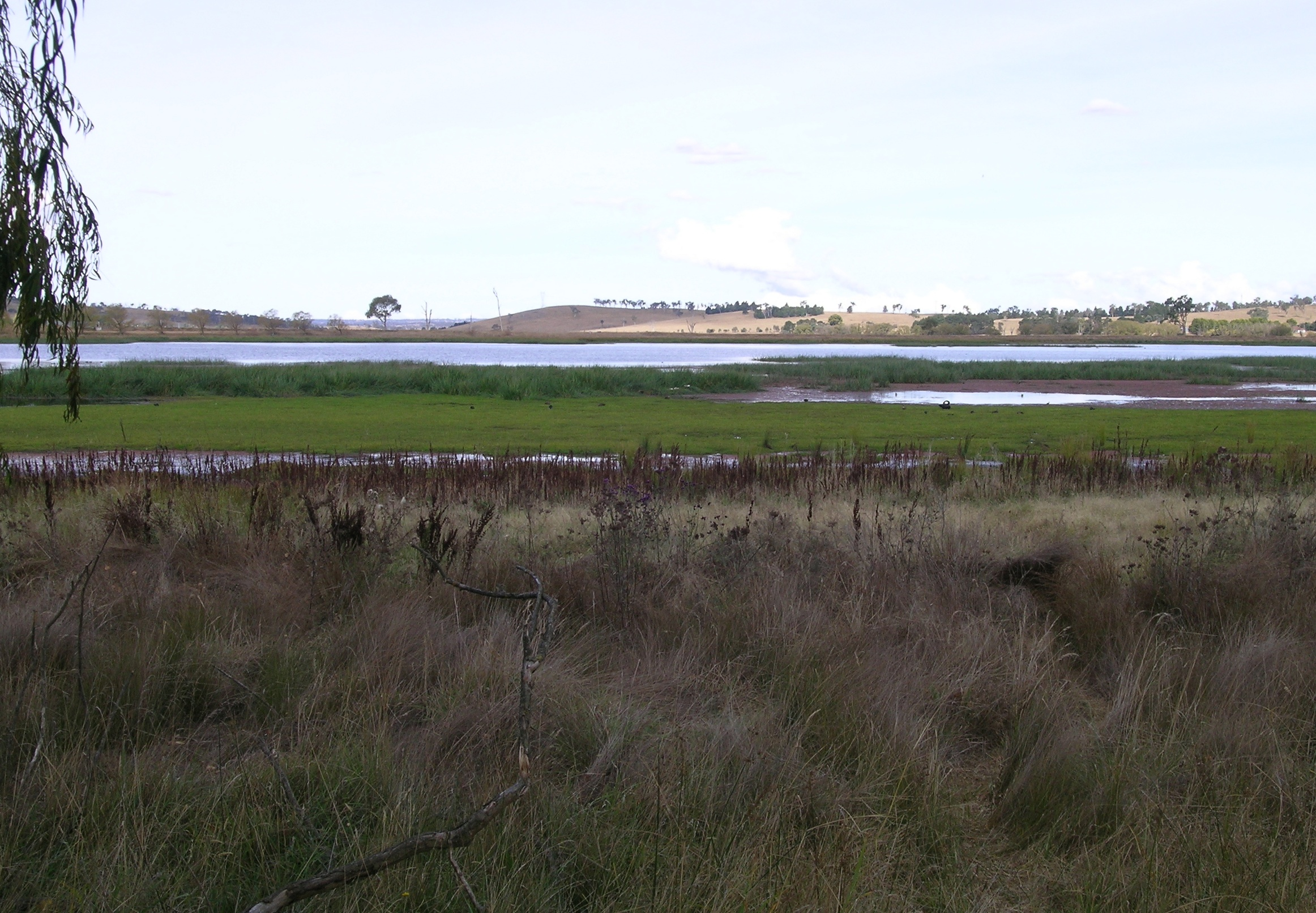
Dangars Lagoon, Uralla

The Northern Tablelands, also known as the New England Tableland, is a plateau and a region of the Great Dividing Range in northern New South Wales, Australia. It includes the New England Range, the narrow highlands area of the New England region, stretching from the Moonbi Range in the south to the Queensland border in the north. The region corresponds generally to the Bureau of Meteorology forecast area for the Northern Tablelands which in this case includes Inverell although it is significantly lower in elevation.

== Geography and climate ==
These tablelands are the largest highland area in Australia, covering approximately 18,197 square kilometres. There are widespread high points over 1,000 metres including The Brothers (1,508m), Ben Lomond (1,505m), Mount Rumbee (1,503m), Point Lookout (1,564m), Campoompeta (1,510m), Mount Spirabo (1,492m), Mount Mitchell (1,475m), Chandler's Peak (1,471m), Mount Grundy (1,462m), Mount Bajimba (1,448 m) and the highest point at Round Mountain is 1,584 metres above sea level. The now closed railway station at Ben Lomond, was the highest railway station in Australia. It is the most extensive highland region in Australia with an average elevation of over 1,000 metres.

The formation of the Great Dividing Range has resulted in a wide variety of soil types being located on the Northern Tablelands. Here soils are mostly derived from basaltic rocks, granite rocks, trap rock or alluvials along creeks and rivers. The New England Peppermint Grassy Woodland is the main vegetation community in the region.

The eastern escarpment of the Tableland has spectacular gorges, rainforests and waterfalls, protected in more than 25 National Parks, with three of them listed as World Heritage Areas by UNESCO and forming part of the Central Eastern Rainforest Reserves (CERRA). Werrikimbe National Park and Oxley Wild Rivers National Park, one of the largest national parks in NSW are accessible from the Oxley Highway east of Walcha. The Oxley Wild Rivers National Park is also accessible via Waterfall Way east of Armidale and south of Hillgrove. Access to the World Heritage listed New England National Park is also from Waterfall Way.

The coastal flowing Clarence, Macleay and Manning rivers have their headwaters on the eastern escarpment of the Tableland. The inland flowing rivers have their confluence with the Gwydir, Namoi and Macintyre river systems of the Murray-Darling River Basin. The only major water storage dam on the Northern Tablelands is Copeton Dam on the Gwydir River near Inverell.

The high elevation of the tablelands means cool summers (rarely over 32 °C) but winters are cold with occasional snowfalls and many frosty mornings. Winter minimums can go as low as -10 °C around Armidale, Guyra, Woolbrook and Walcha regions during frosty mornings, but this usually results in clear sunny days. The Northern Tablelands is a high rainfall region with averages ranging from 650 mm on the western slopes to over 1,200 mm on the east of the range. About 60% of this rainfall occurs during the summer months.

== History ==
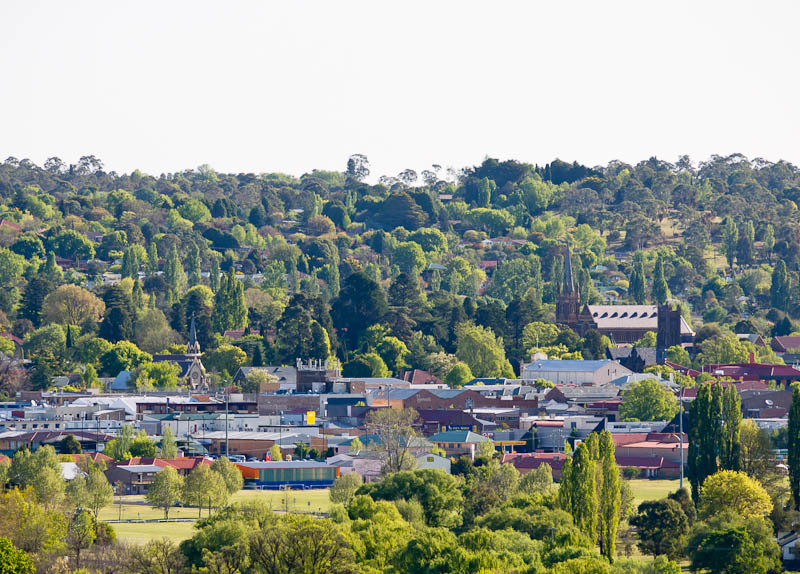
Armidale

Australian Aboriginals have lived on the tablelands for tens of thousands of years. Prior to colonisation there were several language groups in the region, included the Anaiwan language. The indigenous population of the tablelands has been estimated to be 1,100 to 1,200 at the time of colonisation, but was reduced to perhaps 400 by the 1890s.

Walcha was explored in 1818 by John Oxley who ascended the range near Limbri. In 1832 Hamilton Collins Semphill, a settler from Belltrees on the Hunter River, formed a station in the upper Apsley River valley and named it Wolka (Walcha) from the local Aboriginal language. Edward Gostwych Cory, who was displaced from his runs by the Australian Agricultural Company, came over the Moonbi Range and settled at Gostwyck, near Uralla. Soon others followed, seeking new lands away from the influence of the Australian Agricultural Company, which dominated resources in the Hunter valley, and settled around the present Armidale district. In 1844 there were 454,193 sheep and 43,377 cattle grazing the tablelands region. Armidale was then gazetted as a town in 1849. Squatters soon settled the tablelands with their large sheep runs before Glen Innes and Tenterfield were surveyed in 1851. Armidale is the only city on the Tablelands and is the administrative centre for the Northern Tablelands region.

Colonisation was often violently opposed by the indigenous peoples of New England. There were more than forty documented conflicts in the southern half of the Tablelands between the 1830s and 1860s.

In 1852 gold was discovered at Rocky River and by 1856 there were 5,000 miners operating there. Gold was discovered at Bakers Creek, Hillgrove in 1857 but it was not until the late 1880s that the recorded population rose to 2,274 and later to almost 3,000 in about 1898. The difficulties and expense of the deep underground mine workings eventually reduced the gold mining here after 1900.

Captain Thunderbolt the famous bushranger (Frederick Wordsworth Ward, 1836–1870) who escaped from Cockatoo Island came to the Northern Tablelands, where he robbed properties, mail coaches and hotels in the region. In 1866 the Colonial Secretary's Office posted a reward of £100 for his capture, which was raised to £200 by mid-1867 and £400 in December 1869. Many stories have been told his bushranging deeds in the area from Newcastle to the Queensland border. Thunderbolt was shot dead by Constable Walker in May 1870 in Kentucky Creek after a long chase on horseback. His grave is in the town of Uralla, NSW.

The Northern Tablelands includes the towns and Local Government Areas of Armidale, Glen Innes, Guyra, Tenterfield, Walcha, the south-eastern portion of the Inverell Shire and a small part of Tamworth Regional Council area.

The University of New England at Armidale was founded in 1938, becoming the first Australian university established outside a capital city. This public university, with approximately 18,000 higher education students, is one of Australia's major providers of awards to off-campus students.

== Economy ==
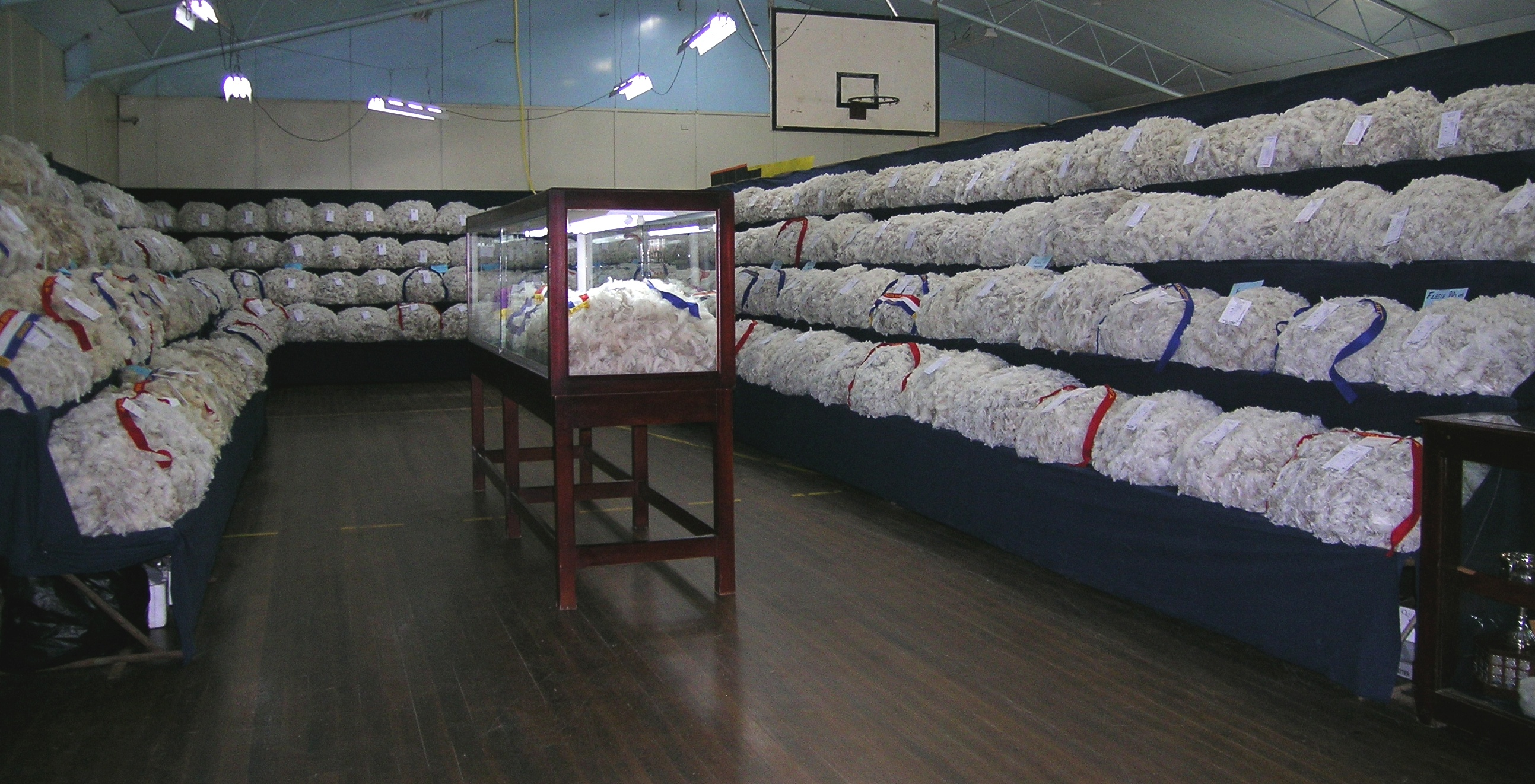
Wool display, Walcha show.

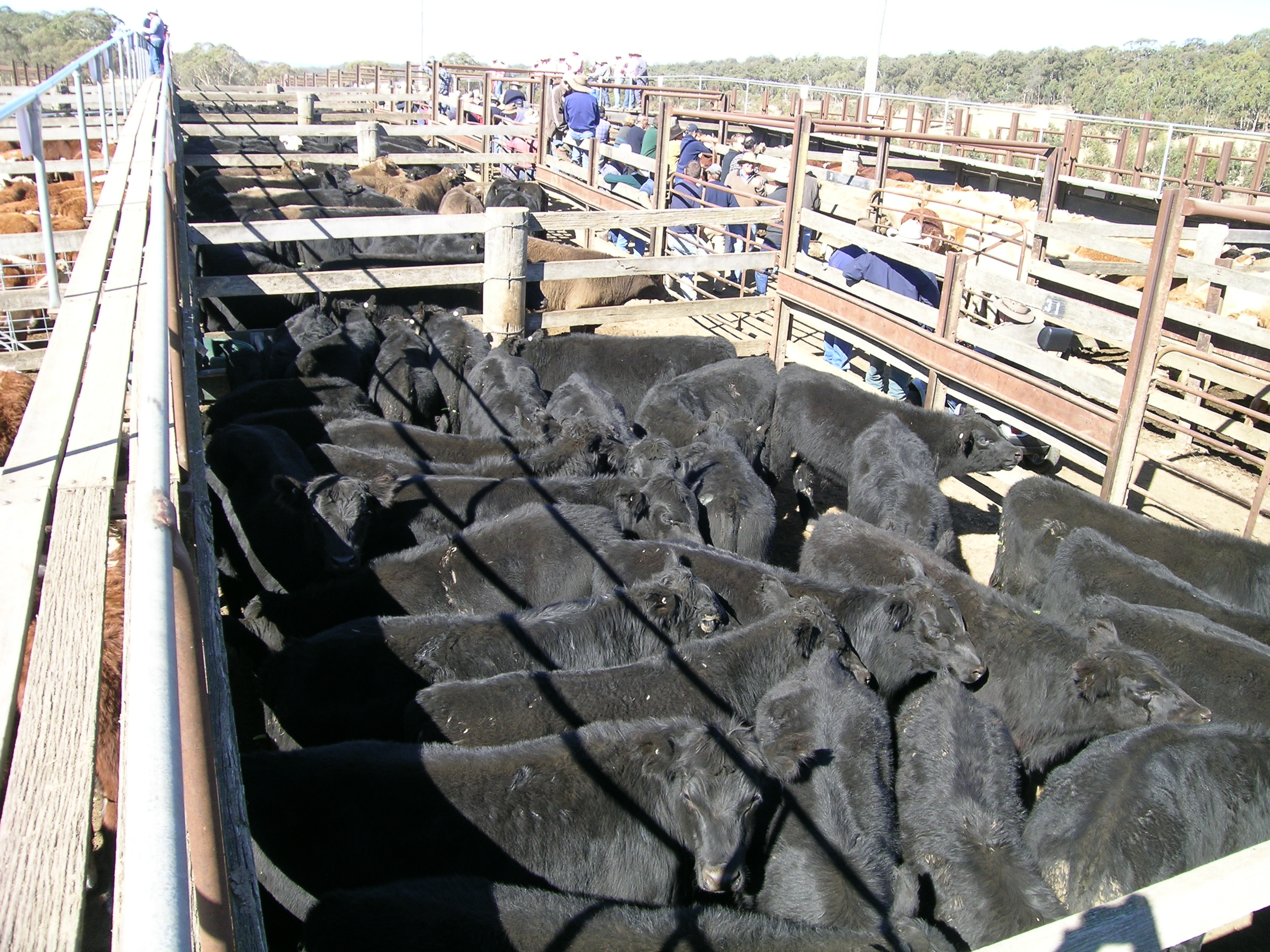
A Northern Tableland weaner sale

The Northern Tablelands cover an area of approximately 3.12 million hectares including 2.11 million hectares occupied by some 2,300 agricultural establishments producing agricultural commodities valued at more than $320 million. Livestock production contributes approximately 90% of this annual income which comes from beef cattle, sheep and wool.

Many beef cattle studs and commercial cattle breeders are located across the Northern Tablelands which has a total of about 792,000 beef cattle. The region has approximately 3.1 million sheep. Areas around Armidale, Uralla and Walcha are noted for their superfine wool production. The Northern Tablelands has been declared an Ovine Johne's disease (OJD) Exclusion Area (EA), under the Stock Diseases Act 1923. Walcha is the site of a large modern dairy farm. Guyra produces prime lambs, potatoes, tulips and glasshouse tomatoes. Apples, pears and other stone fruit are grown at Kentucky and Arding. Pigs, bees, and more recently vineyards also contribute to agricultural production on the tablelands.

During 2008 nine local government areas in the Northern Tablelands recorded a 12 to 35 per cent growth in property values over the last 12 months and a 13 to 22 per cent rise over the last five years according to a report from Australian Property Monitors.

Gold and antimony are mined at Hillgrove. Lockheed Martin operates a satellite tracking dish near Uralla.

== Flora and fauna ==
The Northern Tablelands has a great diversity of plants and fauna, with many thousands of animals, birds and plants in the region.

Black sallee (Eucalyptus stellulata), Blakely's red gum (Eucalyptus blakelyi), broadleaved New England stringybark (Eucalyptus caliginosa), wattles (Acacias), native apples (Angophora floribunda), manna gum (Eucalyptus viminalis), New England blackbutt (Eucalyptus andrewsii), New England peppermint (Eucalyptus nova-anglica), ribbon gum (Eucalyptus nobilis), silvertop stringybark (Eucalyptus laevopinea), snow gum (Eucalyptus pauciflora), river oak (Casuarina cunninghamiana, stringybark (Eucalyptus caliginosa) and yellow box (Eucalyptus melliodora) trees are common across the Northern Tablelands.

Bolivia Hill and the adjacent nature reserve are the only recorded locations of the endangered Bolivia Hill boronia (Boronia boliviensis) and the shrub Pimelea venosa. Some rare Hillgrove gum trees (Eucalyptus michaeliana) may be seen growing along the Long Point Road and the Big Lease, Oxley Wild Rivers National Park. These trees have a distinctive, mottled, greenish trunk with peeling yellow-brown bark.

Weeds are an increasing problem across much of the region. Foxes and rabbits are the most significant vertebrae pests of the tablelands.

Eighteen endangered fauna species, found on the Northern Tableland, have been listed in the schedules of the Threatened Species Conservation Act. The endangered Hastings River mouse (Pseudomys oralis) is restricted in distribution to the upland open forests and woodlands around Werrikimbe National Park and south-east Queensland. Other endangered species that may be seen on the Northern Tablelands include the brush-tailed rock-wallaby (Petrogale penicillata) which lives in isolated sections of the Oxley Wild Rivers National Park. The Bundarra-Barraba Important Bird Area is one of only three breeding areas in New South Wales for the endangered regent honeyeater.

== See also ==
- Electoral district of Northern Tablelands
- Regions of New South Wales
