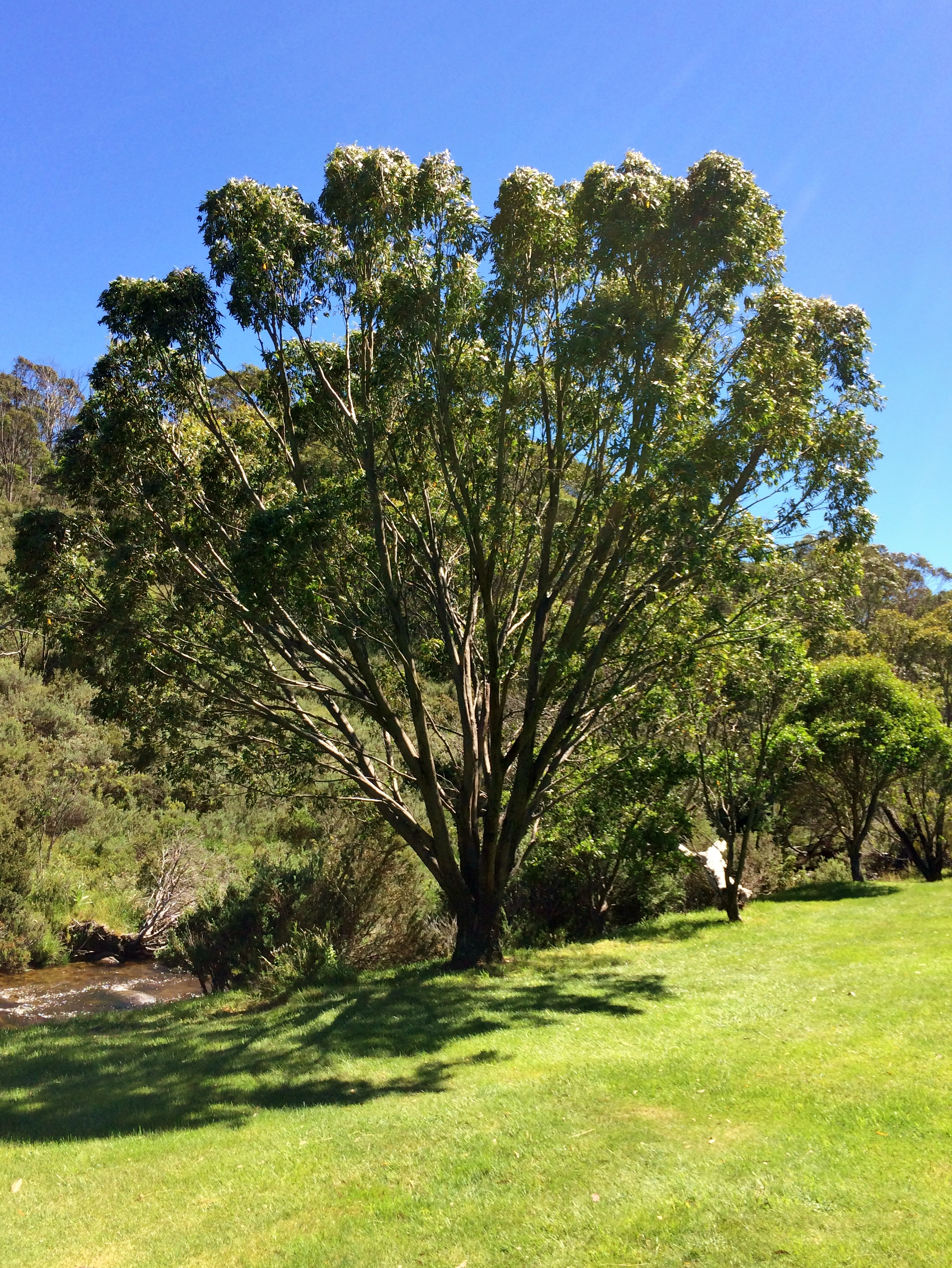
- Eucalyptus stellulata near Thredbo

Conservation status
- Near Threatened (IUCN 3.1)

Scientific classification
- Kingdom: Plantae
- Clade: Tracheophytes
- Clade: Angiosperms
- Clade: Eudicots
- Clade: Rosids
- Order: Myrtales
- Family: Myrtaceae
- Genus: Eucalyptus
- Species: E. stellulata

Binomial name
- Eucalyptus stellulata Sieber ex DC.

Synonyms
- Eucalyptus forresterae Molyneux & Rule

= Eucalyptus stellulata =

Black sallee

Species of eucalyptus

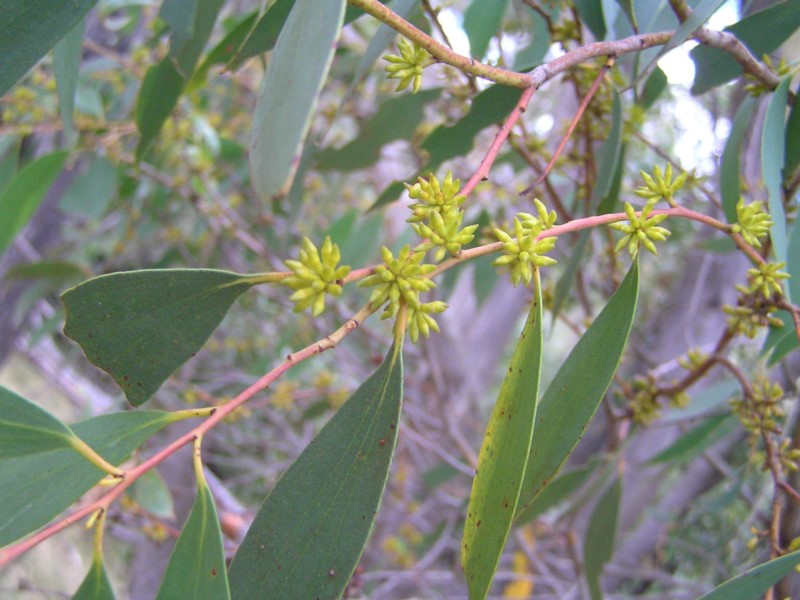
Flower buds

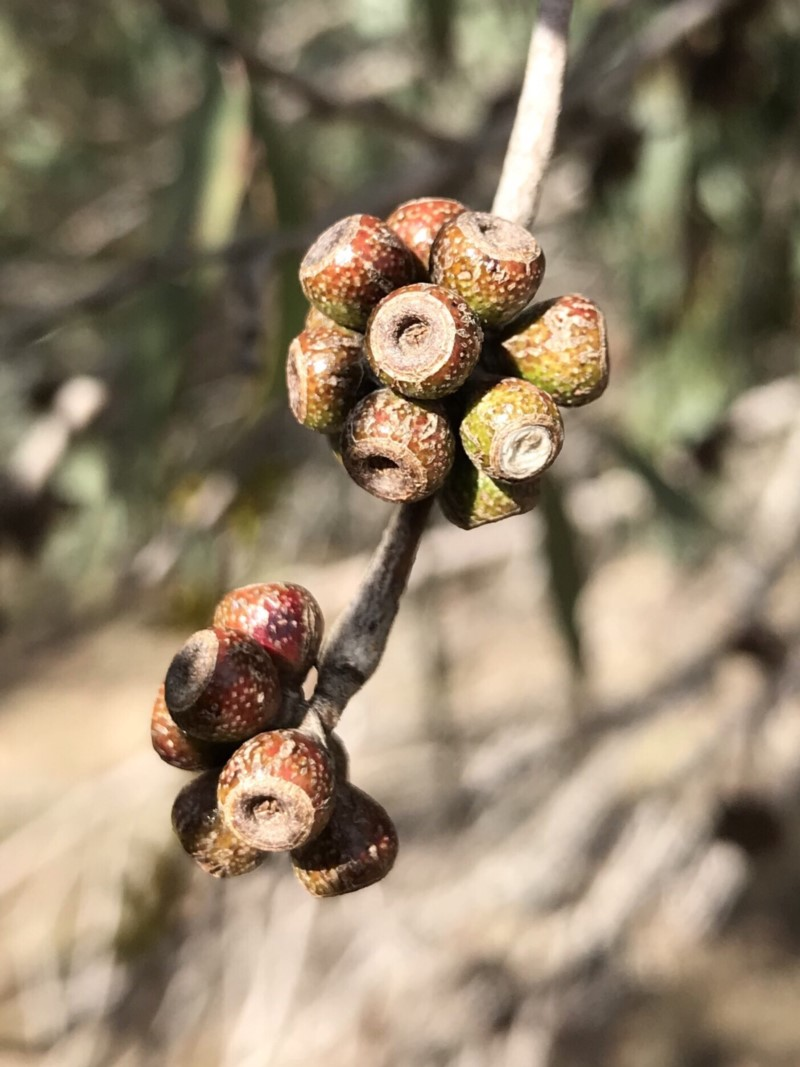
Fruit

Eucalyptus stellulata, commonly known as black sallee or black sally, is a species of small tree or a mallee that is endemic to higher altitude regions of south-eastern Australia. It has rough bark on the lower part of the trunk smooth greenish bark above, lance-shaped to elliptical leaves, flower buds in group of between nine and fifteen, white flowers and cup-shaped or shortened spherical fruit.

== Description ==
Eucalyptus stellulata is a tree or mallee that typically grows to a height of 15 m (49 ft) and forms a lignotuber. It has rough, shortly fibrous greyish bark on the lower trunk, smooth olive green bark that is somewhat oily above. Young plants and coppice regrowth have sessile, elliptical leaves arranged in opposite pairs, 40–100 mm (1.6–3.9 in) long and 30–50 mm (1.2–2.0 in) wide. Adult leaves are arranged alternately, the same glossy green on both sides, lance-shaped to elliptical, 47–110 mm (1.9–4.3 in) long and 9–32 mm (0.35–1.26 in) wide tapering to a petiole 4–13 mm (0.16–0.51 in) long. The leaf veins are almost parallel. The flower buds are arranged in leaf axils in a star-like cluster of between nine and fifteen on an unbranched peduncle 1–6 mm (0.039–0.236 in) long, the individual buds sessile. Mature buds are spindle-shaped, 4–6 mm (0.16–0.24 in) long and about 2 mm (0.079 in) wide with a pointed, conical operculum. Flowering occurs between February and May and the flowers are white. The fruit is a sessile, cup-shaped or shortened spherical capsule 3–5 mm (0.12–0.20 in) long and wide with the valves near rim level.

== Taxonomy and naming ==
Eucalyptus stellulata was first formally described in 1828 by the Swiss botanist Augustin Pyramus de Candolle in his book Prodromus Systematis Naturalis Regni Vegetabilis. The specific epithet (stellulata) is derived from a Latin word meaning "little star" and refers to the appearance of the clustered flower buds.

The Australian Oxford Dictionary gives the origin of "sally" and "sallee" as British dialect variants of "sallow", meaning "a willow tree, especially one of a low-growing or shrubby kind".

The Wiradjuri people of New South Wales use the name guulany for the species.

== Distribution and habitat ==
Black sallee occurs from near Tenterfield in New South Wales and southwards along the Great Dividing Range to the eastern highlands of Victoria. It is a common plant in grassy eucalyptus woodland, often near swamps and by streams. The soils are usually of a relatively good fertility.

== Gallery ==
Features of the black sallee (Eucalyptus stellulata)

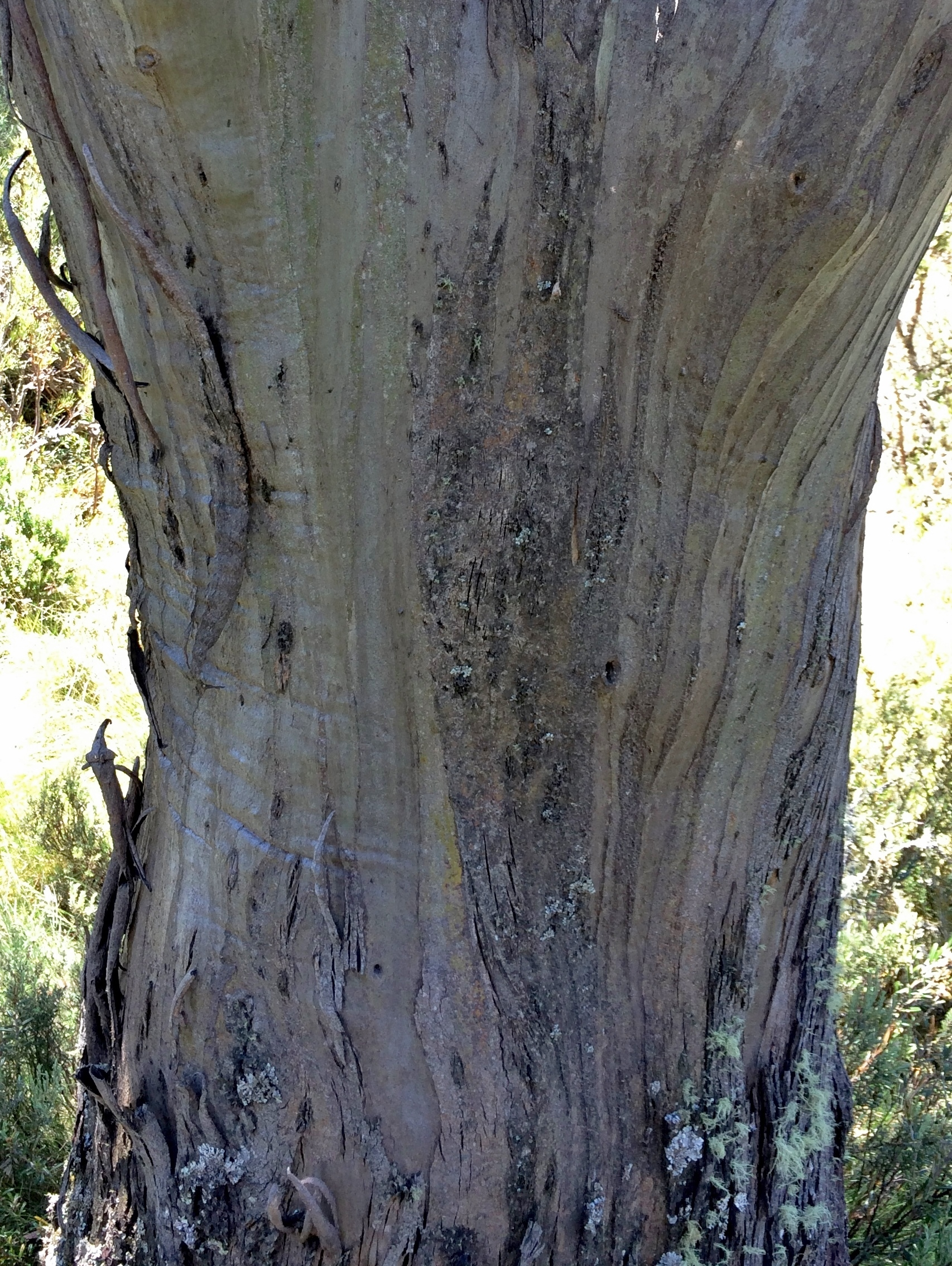
Trunk bark

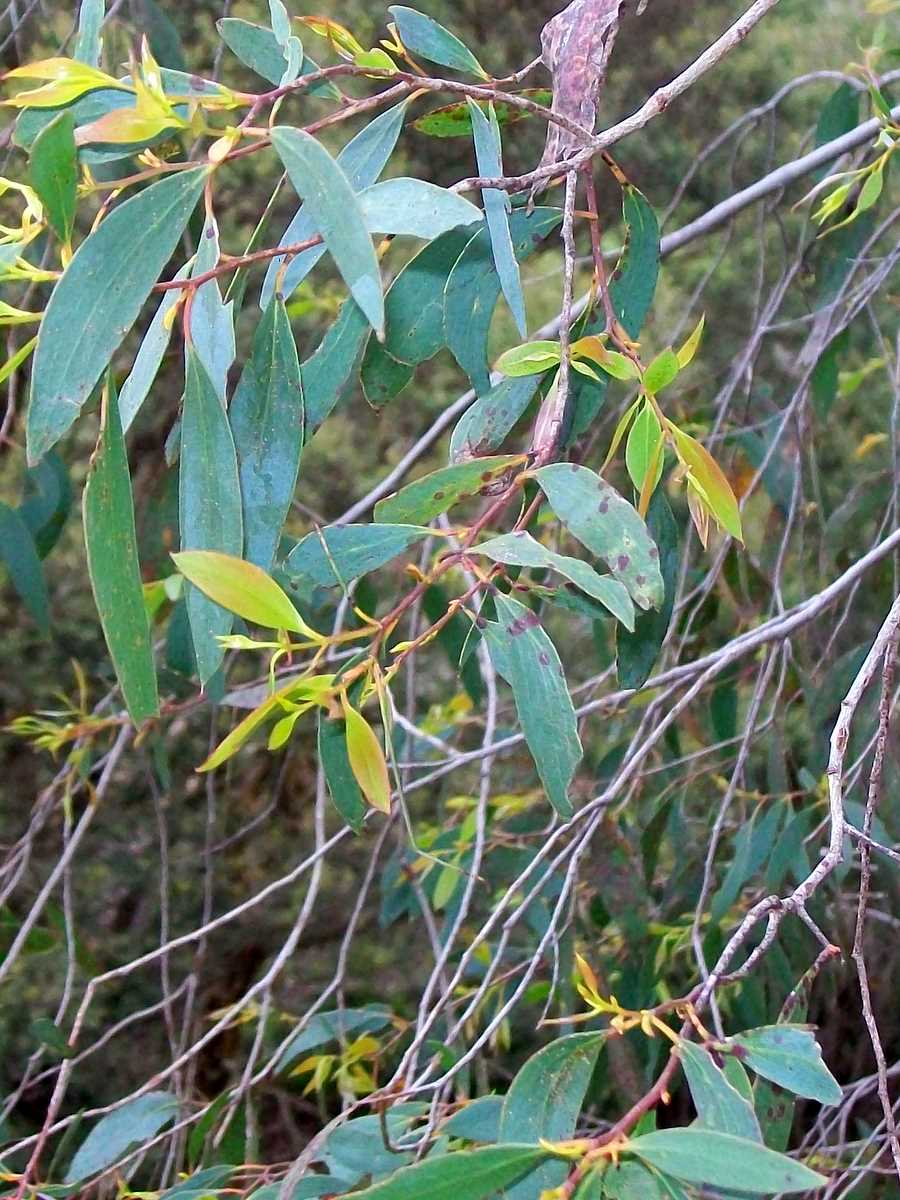
Leaves, showing sub-parallel leaf venation
