= Macleay Valley Bridge =

Bridge over the Macleay River, New South Wales

Macleay Valley Bridge Yapang gurraarrbang gayanddugayigu
- Coordinates: 31°02′26″S 152°53′17″E
- Carries: Pacific Highway: Motor vehicles only
- Crosses: Macleay River
- Locale: Frederickton, New South Wales, Australia
- Other name(s): Macleay River Bridge; Macleay River and Floodplain Bridge
- Owner: Transport for NSW

Characteristics
- Design: Girder bridge
- Material: Concrete
- Total length: 3,200 metres (10,500 ft)
- Width: 21.6 metres (71 ft)
- Longest span: 34 metres (112 ft)
- No. of spans: 94
- No. of lanes: 4; divided highway

History
- Contracted lead designer: Arup Group
- Constructed by: Abigroup
- Construction start: July 2010
- Construction end: February 2012
- Construction cost: A$185 million
- Inaugurated: 27 March 2013 by Anthony Albanese MP, Minister for Infrastructure and Regional Development

The Macleay Valley Bridge is a road bridge over the Macleay River and its floodplain near the settlement of Frederickton, New South Wales, Australia. The bridge is part of the Pacific Highway (A1) new alignment which bypasses Kempsey and Frederickton. At the time of its official opening in 2013, the bridge was the longest road bridge in Australia.

== Description ==
The bridge is constructed of 941 concrete beams supported by 93 piers. Installation of all support beams was completed in October 2012. On 24 February 2013 the bridge was opened to visitors for a preview walk, and then to traffic on 27 March 2013 following an official opening by Anthony Albanese MP, the Minister for Infrastructure and Regional Development.

The 3.2-kilometre-long (2.0 mi) bridge carries four lanes of traffic, part of a 14.5-kilometre (9 mi) stretch of divided highway; two lanes in each direction, each lane 3.5 metres (11 ft) wide.

The bridge was constructed by Abigroup as part of the A$618 million Kempsey Bypass project funded by the Australian Government from the Building Australia Fund; within this budget, the bridge itself cost $185 million.

== Bridge name ==
Following completion of the bridge, Roads & Maritime Services invited the local community to suggest a name for the new bridge. The names Macleay River Bridge or the Macleay River and Floodplain Bridge were to be selected if there was no clear preference. Approximately 70 names were suggested which recognised the history of the area, local people, and the community.

In February 2013 the indigenous Dangghati people requested to name the bridge in the local Dhanggati language Yapang gurraarrbang gayandugayigu, translated to English to mean a very long track to the other side. The group's submission received the support of the Macleay Coast Tourism Association and the Slim Dusty Centre.

The bridge was officially named the Macleay Valley Bridge on 1 December 2015; it has also been given the secondary name of Yapang gurraarrbang gayanddugayigu (or long track to the other side) underneath the main name.

== See also ==
- List of longest bridges
- List of bridges in Australia
