= Himberrong =

Himberrong Clan
- Nationality/Ethnicity: Anaiwan (Aboriginal)
- Language: Nganyaywana
- Dialect: Himberrong
- Location/Region: New England Tableland, NSW

Himberrong is a clan of the Anēwan (also 'Nganyaywana') Aboriginal tribe of what is now known as the New England Tablelands region in northeast New South Wales. Part of their traditional land, once an Aboriginal reserve called Inglebah, is now a heritage Aboriginal Place.

== Territory ==
The territory of the Himberrong clan stretches from the Moonbi Range in the west (adjoining Gamilaraay), past Yarrowitch and Kunderang in the east (adjoining Dunghutti), and from Nowendoc in the south (adjoining Biripi) to north of Walcha (adjoining Inuwon). Border disputes over the Moonbi Range were common between the Himberrong and a clan of the Gamilaraay.

The main camp of the Himberrong was on the bank of the Muluerindie/Macdonald River about two miles upriver from where the 140-acre (57 ha) area of Inglebah now stands. Inglebah was declared an Aboriginal reserve by the NSW Aborigines Protection Board in 1893, and is now preserved as a heritage Aboriginal Place. Inglebah is the Anaiwan word for whirlpools of crayfish; the swamps and gullies throughout the Inglebah district are perforated with thousands of crayfish holes. Inglebah was home to 50 or families until the 1940s, when most of them moved away. The land was handed over to the Aboriginal Land Trust in 1975, and later to the Amaroo Local Aboriginal Land Council. Aboriginal community gatherings are often held at Inglebah.

"Traditionally Aboriginal people camped around Inglebah for fishing and ceremonial activities. Inglebah was favored because it was a sheltered, secure camping spot nestled between hills and the banks of the MacDonald River. It has a permanent water supply from the springs in the area, and various animals could be hunted there."CITEREFNSWOEH2013

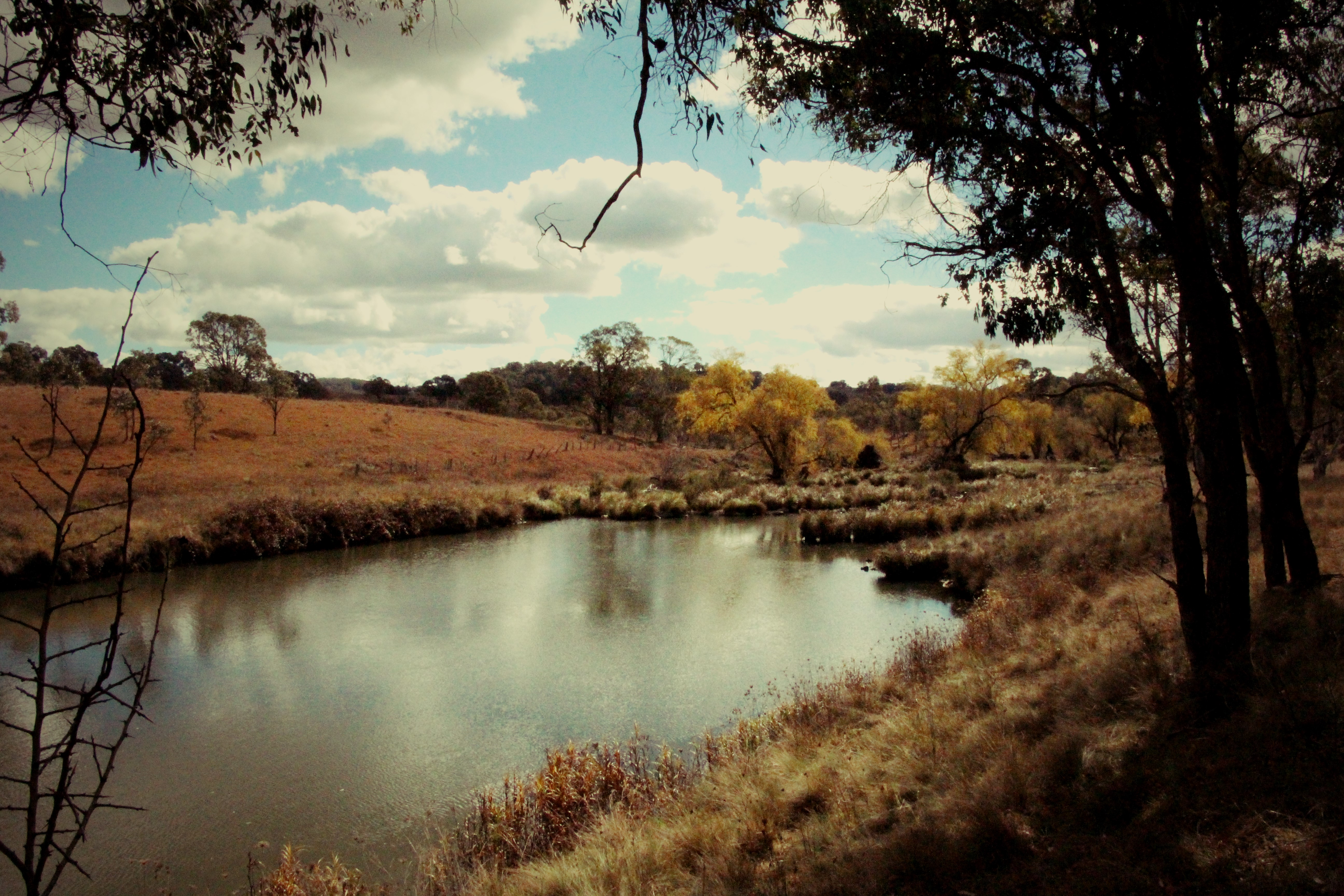
Inglebah Aboriginal Reserve holds special cultural and historical significance for the Himberrong Clan.

== Language ==
The Himberrong clan spoke a dialect of the Anaiwan language. An elicitation of Anaiwan words was recorded on tape by Harry Wright in 1963 "as they were spoken by tribesmen coming into Armidale from Inglebah".

== History ==
At the time of first contact, the Himberrong clan numbered around 600. Each year when winter was approaching, the clan would leave their camp at Inglebah, always heading east in the direction of the Macleay River (Dunghutti territory), but they would not push too far over the Great Dividing Range. On returning from their winter trips, the clan would have a great corroboree.

=== Inglebah Massacre ===
In the late 1800s, colonists used explosives to massacre the Himberrong clan at their main camp. The death toll is unknown.

"There were pieces of burning wood of all sizes hurled hundreds of feet into the air...the shrieks of natives could be heard as they fled in all directions...what became of them for the next six months was never known...they disappeared completely from their usual hunting grounds..."

== Sources ==
- Brazel, Claire (1991). Moore, Alison (ed.). Three of a kind: a history of Niangala, Weabonga and Ingleba. Parramatta: Macarthur Press. ISBN 978-0-646-04577-1.
- Capell, Arthur (1963). Moore, Alison (ed.). CAPELL_A01-000303A Vocabulary elicitation in various NSW north coast languages with Mr Harry Wright (PDF). Australian Institute of Aboriginal and Torres Strait Islander Studies.
- Cohen, Patsy; Somerville, Margaret (1990). Ingelba and the Five Black Matriarchs. Allen & Unwin. ISBN 978-0-044-42147-4.
- "Inglebah". Office of Environment and Heritage. 13 May 2015.
- "Inglebah Aboriginal Place". New South Wales Office of Environment and Heritage. 2013. Archived from the original on 2 April 2015.
- Jamieson, D. (1987). Tales at old Inglebah. Tamworth: Peel Valley Printery.
- Jamieson, Donald (1959). Tales of old Inglebah. Tamworth: Peel Valley Printery.
- "Macdonald River". Geographical Names Board of New South Wales.
- Tindale, Norman Barnett (1974). "Dainggati (NSW". Aboriginal Tribes of Australia: Their Terrain, Environmental Controls, Distribution, Limits, and Proper Names. Australian National University Press. ISBN 978-0-708-10741-6. Archived from the original on 6 March 2017.
