= Ngaku =

Aboriginal Australian tribe located around the Macleay River of New South Wales

The Ngaku were an Aboriginal Australian tribe located around the Macleay River of New South Wales. They were a predominantly coastal people. Although their language was not recorded, it was described as a dialect or accent of Dhanggati.

== Country ==
Ngaku territory encompassed some 1,800 square miles (4,700 km^{2}). On the coast it coast extended north from Point Plomer to Trial Bay. It covered the area from the Macleay River south to Rollands Plains. It ran northwards to Macksville and stretched inland near the Kemp Pinnacle Mountain. To their south were the Ngamba. (Note: A. R. Radcliffe-Brown placed them south of the Ngamba in 1929, and Tindale corrects this. (Tindale 1974))

== People and history ==
Little is known of the Ngaku. Writing in 1929, A. R. Radcliffe-Brown stated that by that time the Ngaku were virtually extinct, descendants surviving only as a remnant together with people from the Ngamba tribe. Norman Tindale classified the Yarraharpny mentioned in one early account as a horde of the Ngaku.

One account by Henderson, writing in 1851 of the way clashes with the intrusive cedar-cutting gangs who began to work Ngaku territory, runs as follows:

On one occasion, during the illness of our former worthy commissioner, Mr. Oakes, Mr. Sullivan, who was Commissioner of Crown Lands (Australia) Commissioner of Crown Lands, within the boundaries, went on an expedition against the Yarraharpny blacks, a tribe notorious for their savage dispositions, and inhabiting the country between the mouths of the MacLeay and the Nambuccoo. They had, at that time made an attack upon the sawyers occupied on the latter river, which had ended in the murder of one of these adventurous men, and this was not the first time that their aggressions had so ended. The commissioner, taking the police with him, came upon their camp, and dispersed them with some slaughter.

One crying baby was discovered hidden in a hole as the dispersed area of gunyahs was scoured. Its fate was not known. This was one of several massacres of the macLeay River tribes, at Wabra Station, Towel Creek, Henderson's Creek and Sheep Station Bluff, registered during the early colonial period recorded not only by Henderson but a local pioneer Mary McMaugh.

== Alternative name ==
- Niungacko (This refers to the language of the group that once lived in and around Trial Bay.)

== Sources ==
- Harrison, Rodney (2004). Shared Landscapes: Archaeologies of Attachment and the Pastoral Industry in New South Wales. University of New South Wales Press. ISBN 978-0-868-40559-9.
- Henderson, John (1851). Excursions and adventures in New South Wales. W. Shoberl.
- Hodgkinson, Clement (1845). Australia from Port Macquarie to Moreton Bay: with descriptions of the natives, their manners and customs; the geology, natural productions, fertility, and resources of that region. London: T. and W. Boone.
- Prineas, Peter (1997). Wild Places: Wilderness in Eastern New South Wales. Katsehamos & the Great Idea. ISBN 978-0-858-81158-4.
- Radcliffe-Brown, A. R. (July–December 1929). "Notes on Totemism in Eastern Australia". The Journal of the Royal Anthropological Institute of Great Britain and Ireland. 59: 399–415. doi:10.2307/2843892. JSTOR 2843892.
- Tindale, Norman Barnett (1974). "Ngaku (NSW)". Aboriginal Tribes of Australia: Their Terrain, Environmental Controls, Distribution, Limits, and Proper Names. Australian National University Press. ISBN 978-0-708-10741-6.
