= Aniwan language =

Aniwan language may refer to:

- Nganyaywana language (Australia)
- Futuna-Aniwan language (Vanuatu)
