= Nils Holmer =

Swedish linguist (1904–1994)

Nils Magnus Holmer
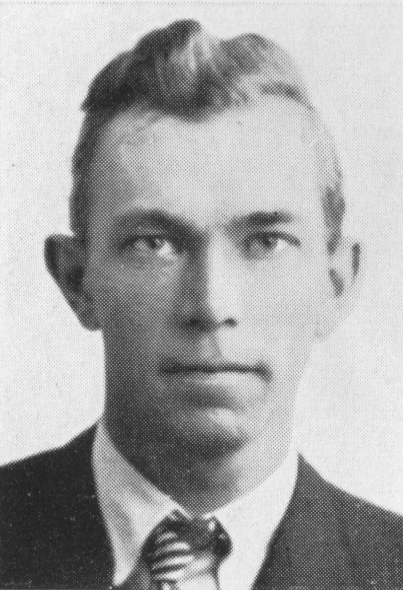
- Born: 1905
- Died: 1994 (aged 88–89)
- Known for: work in Scottish Gaelic linguistics
- Scientific career
- Fields: linguistics, Celtic studies

Nils Magnus Holmer (1905–1994) was a Swedish linguist.

== Education and research ==
Holmer initially studied Russian at Lund University, where he focused on Indo-European linguistics.

In the 1920s, Holmer was a guest student at a university in Prague, where he switched to studying Celtic languages.

Holmer spent four months in the Scottish Highlands in the mid-1930s. From June to July 1935, he was in Argyllshire on the Isle of Gigha, off Kintyre where he met and conversed with almost the whole population of about 100 people. From March to June 1936 he stayed in the Rinns (mostly at Port Charlotte where he lived with a family who spoke idiomatic Gaelic. He visited other parts of the Gaelic- and English-speaking Highlands, especially the Isle of Skye from July to August 1935, where he became acquainted with the common speech of the "Strath" between Broadford and Torrin. During this time, he amassed a significant collection of vocabulary, knowledge and tradition from the last regularly Scottish Gaelic-speaking generation in particular the southern dialects of Kintyre, Arran and Argyll whose speakers had mostly died by the 1950s. He published several books and articles on the topic and this material is the largest body of evidence for how this dialect was used and spoken in everyday life. Experts in the Gaelic Society of Inverness considered Holmer to be a gifted scholar in the area.

Holmer carried out fieldwork across a wide range of languages across several continents, including Irish, Siouan languages, the Central American language Guna and the South American language of Choco and Wayuu.

He was "deeply immersed" in the Basque language.

His contact with the Algonquian languages, Iroquoian languages was believed by Proinsias Ó Drisceoil to have influenced what Drisceoil concluded was Holmer's "most important work" in grammatical typology.

During the 1960s and 1970s he conducted extensive fieldwork into several Australian Aboriginal languages including recording the Maric languages in the Warrego and Maranoa rivers region from several speakers in the 1960s. Holmer salvaged as much as he could from Wakka Wakka language, analysing and publishing the results. He recorded and analysed the Dhanggati or Djangadi language in 1969. His work was helpful in the efforts of the Ngabu Bingayi Aboriginal Corporation to promote study of the language at Kempsey TAFE. He also compiled a grammar and dictionary for the Mununjali language in 1978.

== Career ==
Holmer was professor of linguistics at Lund University between 1949 and 1969.

After his retirement, he moved to Argyll, Scotland, where he lived for a few years near Oban. Whilst there, he conducted research into the surviving speakers of Loch Etive-side Gaelic.

Holmer is notable as the only Swede to have three articles published in the journal Language.

== Personal life ==
Holmer was born in Gothenburg, Sweden, in 1905.

He married Vanja E.

He died in Sweden in 1994.

== Bibliography ==
- Holmer, Nils M.Studies on Argyllshire Gaelic. Uppsala et Leipzig, (Skrifter utgivna av K. Humanistika Vetenskaps Samfundet i Uppsala, 1938
- Holmer, N M. On Some Relics of the Irish Dialect spoken in the Glens of Antrim: with an Attempt toward the Reconstruction of Northeastern Irish; Being a Report of a Visit to the Glens of Antrim in 1937 Uppsala Almqvist & Wiksells boktryckeri a.b. 1940.
- Holmer N M, The Irish Language in Rathlin Island, Co. Antrim, Todd Lecture Series; iom-leabhar 18, Royal Irish Academy agus Hodges, Figgis, Baile Átha Cliath, 1942.
- Holmer, Nils Magnus. Critical and comparative grammar of the Cuna language, Göteborg : [Etnografiska Museet], 1947
- Holmer, Nils M. Indian Place Names in North America. Upsala: The American Institute in the University of Upsala, 1948.
- Holmer, Nils Magnus Ethno-linguistic Cuna dictionary, Göteborg : Etnografiska Museet, 1952.
- Holmer, Nils M. The Seneca language; a study in Iroquoian, Upsala, Lundequist 1954
- Holmer, Nils M. The Gaelic of Arran. Dublin, The Institute for Advanced Studies, 1957
- Holmer, N M. The Dialects of Co. Clare (Part 1), Todd Lecture Series, iom-leabhar 19–20. Royal Irish Academy agus Hodges, Figgis, Baile Átha Cliath, 1962
- Holmer, Nils M. On the history and structure of the Australian languages, Upsala : Lundequistka bokhandeln, 1963.
- Holmer, Nils Magnus El idioma vasco hablado : un estudio de dialectología euskérica, San Sebastian, 1964.
- Holmer, Nils Magnus The Indian place names in Mexico and Central America Uppsala : Lundequistska bokhandeln, 1964.
- Holmer, N M The Dialects of Co. Clare (part 2), Todd Lecture Series, iom- leabhar 19–20, Royal Irish Academy agus Hodges, Figgis, Baile Átha Cliath, 1965.
- Holmer, Nils M. An Attempt towards a Comparative Grammar of Two Australian Languages. Canberra Australian Institute of Aboriginal Studies, 1966.
- Holmer, Nils Magnus, Oceanic semantics : a study in the framing of concepts in the native languages of Australia and Oceania, Uppsala : Ludequistska bokhandeln, 1966.
- Holmer, Nils Magnus and Holmer, Vanja E. Stories from two native tribes of Eastern Australia, Upsala : A.-b. Lundequistska bokhandeln, 1969.
- Holmer, Nils Magnus A comparative typological analysis of a New Guinea language, Stockholm : Almqvist & Wiksell Periodicals Co, 1971.
- Holmer, Nils M Notes on the Bandjalang Dialect. Spoken at Coraki and Bungawalbin Creek, N.S.W. Canberra. Australian Institute of Aboriginal Studies., 197
- Holmer, Nils Magnus. Linguistic survey of South-Eastern Queensland., Canberra : Department of Linguistics, Research School of Pacific Studies, Australian National University, 1983. ISBN 085883295X
- Holmer, Nils M. Notes on some Queensland languages, Canberra, A.C.T., Australia : Dept. of Linguistics, Research School of Pacific Studies, Australian National University, 1988. ISBN 0858833727
