= Dyke River =

River in New South Wales, Australia

Location
- Country: Australia
- State: New South Wales
- IBRA: New England Tablelands
- District: Northern Tablelands
- LGA: Armidale

Physical characteristics
- Source: Cunnawarra Range, Dorrigo Plateau
  - location: east of Uralla and west of Nambucca Heads
  - coordinates: 30.58183°S 152.32987°E
  - elevation: 1,170 m (3,840 ft)
- Mouth: Macleay River
  - location: Lower Creek, northwest of Bellbrook
  - coordinates: 30.72467°S 152.26487°E
  - elevation: 118 m (387 ft)
- Length: 62 km (39 mi)

Basin features
- Progression: Macleay → Tasman Sea

Dyke River is a perennial stream of the Macleay River catchment, located in the Northern Tablelands district of New South Wales, Australia.

== Course and features ==
Dyke River rises on the southern slopes of the Cunnawarra Range on the Dorrigo Plateau in high country east of Uralla and west of Nambucca Heads, and flows generally south by west before reaching its confluence with the Macleay River at Lower Creek, northwest of Bellbrook. The river descends 1,050 metres (3,440 ft) over its 28 kilometres (17 mi) course.

== See also ==
- List of rivers of Australia
