= Djangadi =

Aboriginal Australian people from Macleay Valley, New South Wales

Dunghutti people
- aka: Dhangadi, Boorkutti, Burgadi, Burugardi, Dainggati, Dainiguid, Dang-getti, Dangadi, Dangati, Danggadi, Danggetti, Danghetti, Dhangatty, Djaingadi, Nulla Nulla, Tang-gette, Tangetti, and Thangatti
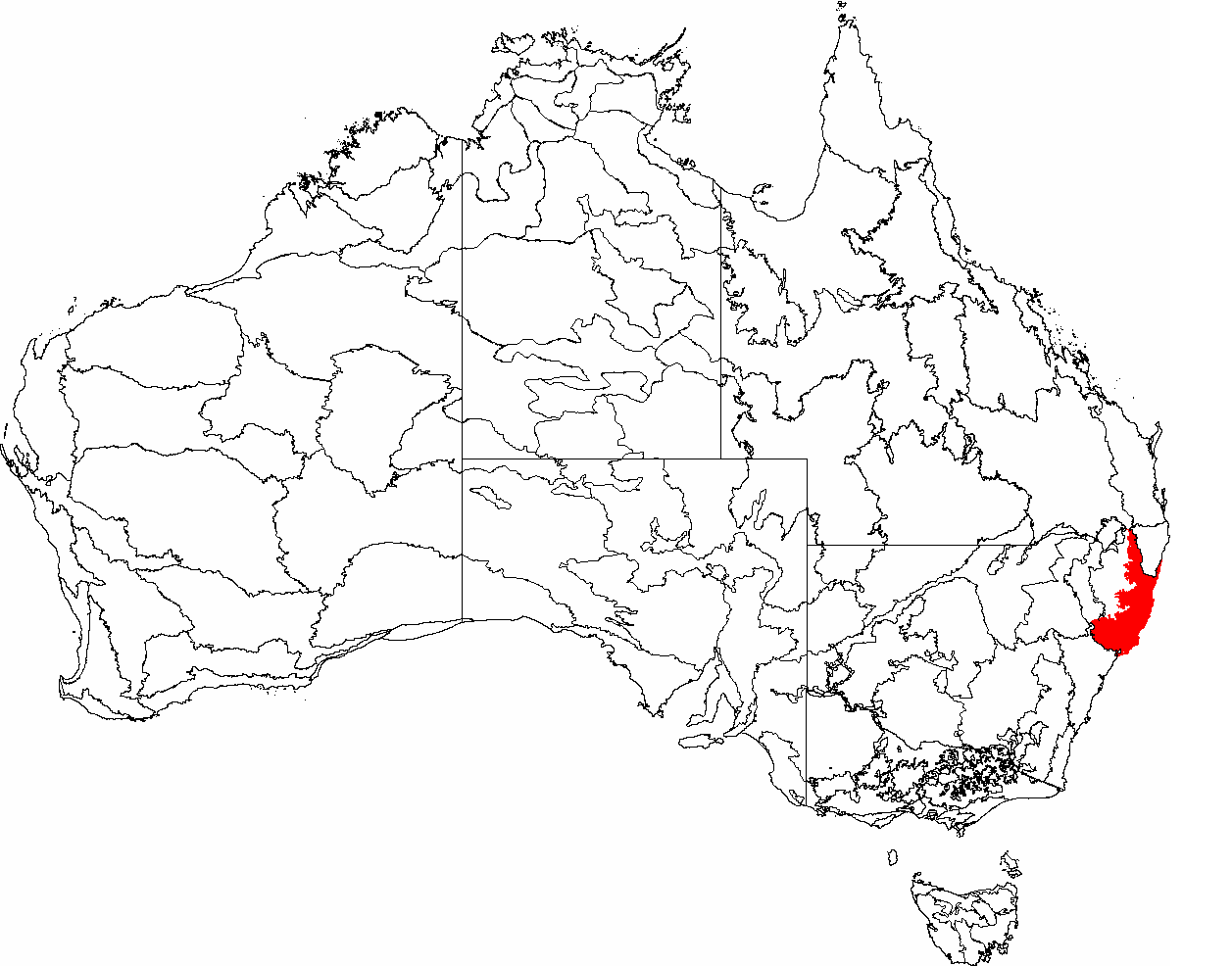
- NSW North Coast bioregion

Hierarchy
- Language family: Pama–Nyungan
- Language branch: Yuin–Kuric
- Language group: Yora
- Group dialects: Dunghutti

Area
- Location: Mid North Coast, New South Wales
- Rivers: Macleay River; Apsley River
- Urban areas: Kempsey; South West Rocks; Crescent Head; Walcha

The Djangadi people, also spelt Dhungatti, Dainggati, Tunggutti or Dunghutti are an Aboriginal Australian people resident in the Macleay Valley of northern New South Wales.

== Language ==
Dhanggati / Dunghutti belongs to the Yuin–Kuric language family and is usually grouped with the Anēwan language. The Ngabu Bingayi Aboriginal Corporation promotes the revival study of their language learning as an ongoing activity in the Macleay Valley. Linguist Amanda Lissarrague has been active in assisting their efforts. The language is currently being taught at Kempsey TAFE. Part of the language was recorded and analysed by Nils Holmer and his wife.

== Country ==
Ethnologist Norman Tindale estimated Djangadi traditional lands to have encompassed some 3,500 square miles (9,100 km^{2}). They took in the area from Point Lookout southwards as far as the headwaters of the Macleay River and the vicinity of the Mount Royal Range. To the east, their territory ran as far as the crests of the coastal ranges, while their inland extension to the west ran up to the Great Dividing Range and Walcha. The people to their north were the Gumbaynggirr. On their western flank were the Anēwan. The southern linguistic border is with Biripi.

== People ==
They are people of the nation.

- Nulla Nulla
- Conderang.

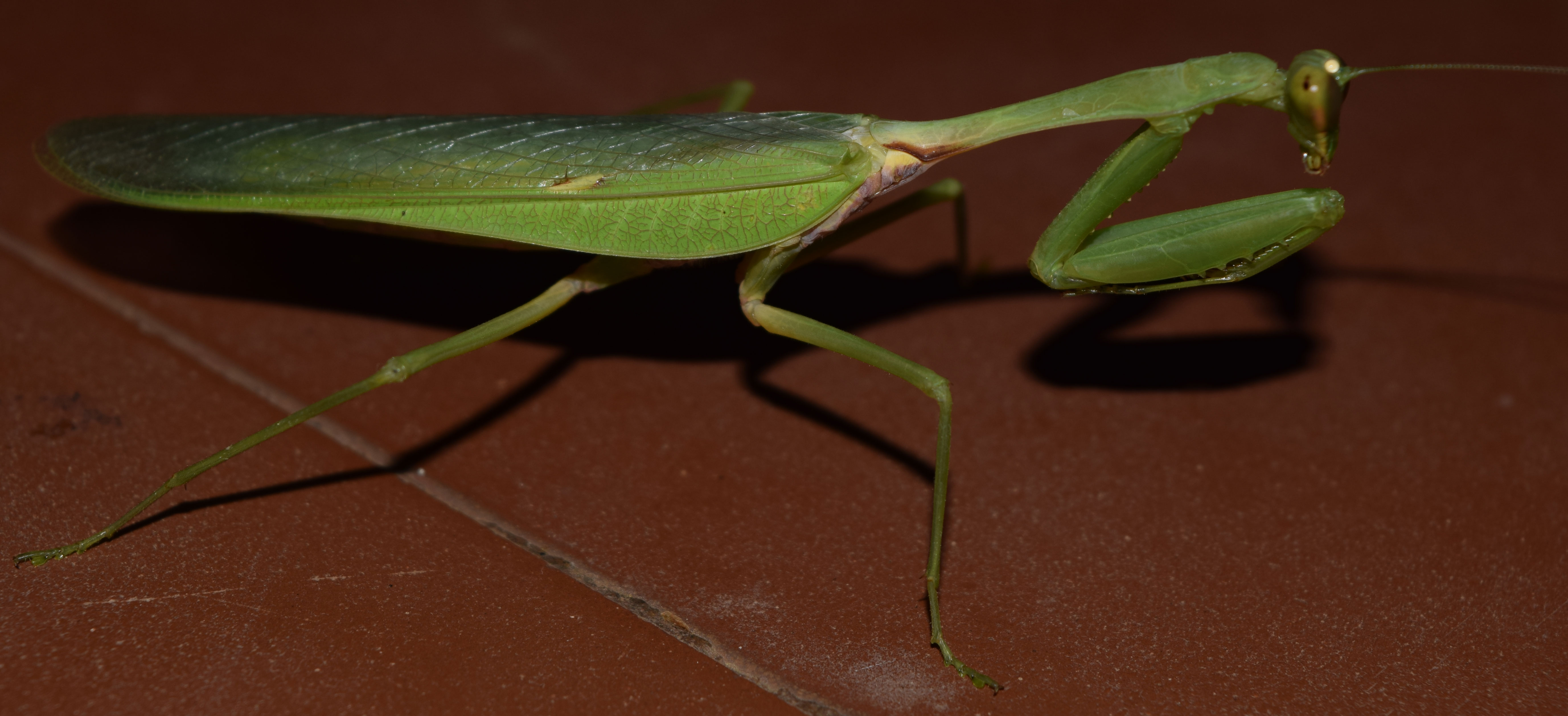
Praying Mantis

Totems, according to some elderly informants, could be social or personal. The praying mantis (gurginj gurginj) is listed among the former as a river totem and described as covering the river stretch from Bellbrook downwards as far as the area around Georges Creek. Animals such as the echidna were personal totems, with which particular persons were identified. The term for the localized patrilineal horde was dawun.

== Sacred sites ==
The Djangadi creation myth contains a legend about the Rainbow Serpent, who was believed to have created the gorge at Apsley Falls in the Dreamtime. Once underground, it was said to have re-emerged at the mill hole near Walcha on the Apsley River.

=== Burrel Bulai ===
Burrel Bulai (Mount Anderson) is considered to be one of the most powerful sacred sites in Thunghutti/Dunghutti Country and was registered was recorded as a place of significance by Ray Kelly, an Aboriginal Research Officer with the NSW Sites of Significance Survey team.

=== Long Gully ===
Two high ridges overlook the site, which was used, as late as 1932, for the final stages of initiation.

=== Carrai waterholes ===
Young Djangadi men went through initiation rites at Carrai Waterholes.

== History ==
An Aboriginal presence in the Djangadi lands has been attested archaeologically to go back at least 4,000 years, according to the analysis of the materials excavated at the Clybucca midden, a site which the modern-day descendants of the Djangadi and Gumbaynggirr claim territory. In the Clybucca area are ancient camp sites with shell beds in the form of mounds which are up to 2 metres (6 ft 7 in) high. Middens are attested in the Macleay Valley, together with remnants of a fish trap in the Limeburners Creek Nature Reserve and, just slightly north of Crescent Head, at Richardsons Crossing, there is a bora ring.

White intrusion on the Djangadi lands first took off as mostly ex-convict cedar cutters, based at a camp at Euroka Creek established by Captain A. C. Innes in 1827, began exploring the rich resources of the area in the late 1820s. The first European settler in the Kempsey district was named Enoch William Rudder, in 1835, who had purchased a land grant of 802 acres (325 ha) from its first owner, Samuel Onions. Within a decade the timber cutters had virtually harvested every stand of this highly prized red gold timber in clearances that made the land increasingly attractive to pastoralists, who by 1847, after the Crown Lands Occupation Act of 1836 permitted squatting, had established 31 stations along the Macleay river from Kempsey inland to Kunderang Brook. This coincided with one of the most violent and sustained examples of warfare in the Macleay gorges, during which it is estimated that around 15 massacres took place in the region targeting Aboriginal people of the area.

The Djangadi and other tribes affected adopted guerilla tactics to fight the usurpation of their land, by attacking shepherds, hit-and-run raids on homesteads and duffing sheep and cattle livestock before retreating into the gorges where pursuit was difficult. Some 2 to 3 dozen people were killed for rustling sheep at a massacre which took place at Kunderang Brook in 1840. The war ended with the establishment of a force of native police at Nulla Nulla in 1851. However, by that time, attrition had devastated tribal numbers. Of the 4,000 Aboriginal people in the area before the settlements, one third are thought to have been killed in a little over two decades.

A description of the Djangadi and other Aboriginal groups in the Macleay area was given by Captain John Macdonald Henderson in 1851.

Some Djangadi settled the Shark, Pelican Island and the two Fattorini Islands in the Macleay River, gazette as Aboriginal reserves in 1885, and grew corn there. In 1924 the Fattorini island residents were relocated to Pelican Island, and its status as a reservation was cancelled. Eventually the Djangadi moved to Kinchela Creek Station though an unofficial camp remained at Green Hills, resisting attempts to have them relocated, until they were placed under the administration of a white manager at Burnt Bridge Reserve. Discrimination barriers were finally broken in part when the first Aboriginal children were permitted in 1947 to attend Green Hill Public School, though the white community reacted by shifting their children to West Kempsey.

== Native title ==
The first successful mainland claim for native title was made by the Djangadi, whose rights were recognised by the New South Wales Government in the Crescent Head Agreement. They were awarded in the same year A$738,000 in compensation, with an attached agreement to be paid another sum a decade later. A sum of A$6.1m was paid as a compensation payout which the state government has made 14 years later, based on recognition that 12.4 ha (31 acres) at Crescent Head, which had been given residential development approval, lay under their native title rights.

== Djangadi culture ==
The Wigay Aboriginal Cultural Park near Kempsey contains over 150 different native Indigenous plants to the Macleay Valley. The site is diversified by plantations of species according to rainforest, dry forest, tropical forest, heathland and wetland niches.

== Alternative names and spellings ==
Source: Tindale 1974, p. 192 unless otherwise indicated.

- Amberu
- Boorkutti
- Burgadi
- Burugardi (inland horde)
- Dang-getti
- Dangadi
- Dangati
- Danggadi
- Danghetti
- Dhangatty
- Dhungatti
- Djaingadi
- Himberrong
- Jang (coastal exonym for the tableland Djangadi, 'bad folk')
- Nulla Nulla
- Tang-gette
- Tangetti
- Thangatti
- Thangatty
- Yung
- Yunggai
- Yuungai

== Notable Djangadi people ==
=== Boxers ===
- Bradley Hore
- Renold Quinlan - Middleweight champion
- Dave Sands
- Hector Thompson

=== Rugby league players ===
- Beau Champion
- Greg Inglis
- Albert Kelly
- Amos Roberts
- Tyrone Roberts-Davis
- Jonathan Wright
- Triston Reilly

=== Other notable Djangadi people ===
- Torita Blake, Paralympian athlete
- Blak Douglas, winner of the 2022 Archibald Prize
- Samantha Harris, fashion model
- Loretta Kelly, law academic
- Amos Morris, guitarist

== Sources ==
- "Language information: Dunghutti". Australian Indigenous Languages Database. AIATSIS. 26 June 2012.
- Bushnell, Tom (19 April 2018). "Ngabu Bingayi Aboriginal Corporation launch Dhanggati language series". The Macleay Argus.
- "Carrai National park and Carrai State Conservation Area: Plan of Management" (PDF). NSW National Parks and Wildlife Service. July 2008.
- "Clybucca Historic Site: Plan of Management" (PDF). NSW National Parks and Wildlife Service. September 2007.
- Connaughton, Todd (30 December 2014). "Learn the local language". The Macleay Argus.
- Grimes, Barbara (2003). "Dyangadi languages". In Frawley, William (ed.). International Encyclopedia of Linguistics: AAVE-Esperanto. Vol. 1. Oxford University Press. ISBN 978-0-195-13977-8.
- Hampshire, Wendy Joy (2011). Dhangude Bunghutti Burrai: Welcomed to Dunghutti Land (PhD thesis). Southern Cross University.
- Harrison, Rodney (2004). Shared Landscapes: Archaeologies of Attachment and the Pastoral Industry in New South Wales (PDF). University of New South Wales Press. ISBN 978-0-868-40559-9.
- Henderson, John Macdonald (1851). Excursions and adventures in New South Wales. Vol. 2. London: W. Shoberl.
- "History of the Macleay Valley". Kempsey Shire Council.
- Holmer, Nils Magnus; Holmer, Vanja E. (1969). Stories from two tribes of Eastern Australia. Australian Essays and Studies. Vol. 6. Uppsala: A.-B. Lundequistska bokhandeln.
- Honan, Kim (12 July 2012). "Big bush tucker garden handed back". ABC Rural.
- Horrigan, Bryan (1997). "Native Title Overview: Commercial Dimensions and Ongoing Developments". In Horrigan, Bryan; Young, Simon (eds.). Commercial Implications of Native Title. Federation Press. pp. 2–27. ISBN 978-1-862-87218-9.
- Jopson, Debra (20 February 2010). "$6.1m payout made on native title claim". The Sydney Morning Herald.
- Kijas, Jo; Kelly, Ray (2013). Revival, Renewal and Return (PDF). NSW National Parks and Wildlife Service.
- Klein, Thom (23 November 2012). "Dhangatti elders reveal bridge name proposal in song". The Macleay Argus.
- "Living by the Macleay River". NSW National Parks and Wildlife Service. 26 February 2011.
- "Long Gully". NSW National Parks and Wildlife Service.
- Morris, Barry (1988). "Dhan-gadi resistance to assimilation". In Keen, Ian (ed.). Being Black: Aboriginal Cultures in "settled" Australia. Aboriginal Studies Press. pp. 33–63. ISBN 978-0-855-75185-2.
- Morris, Barry (1989). Domesticating Resistance: The Dhan-Gadi Aborigines and the Australian State. Bloomsbury Academic. ISBN 978-0-854-96271-6.
- Tindale, Norman Barnett (1974). Aboriginal Tribes of Australia: Their Terrain, Environmental Controls, Distribution, Limits, and Proper Names. Australian National University Press. ISBN 978-0-708-10741-6.
