= Endangered Language Alliance =

US-based nonprofit organization

- Founded: 2010
- Founder: Juliette Blevins; Bob Holman; Daniel Kaufman
- Region served: New York metropolitan area
- Director: Daniel Kaufman; Ross Perlin
- Website: www.elalliance.org

The Endangered Language Alliance (ELA) is a nonprofit organization founded in 2010 to document the least-known languages in the New York metropolitan area. As reported by Language Magazine, "The ELA's methodology relies on longstanding collaborations between linguists and communities as well as ongoing conversations between academics and speakers of endangered languages". It is the only organization in the world focused on linguistic diversity of urban areas.

== Mission and programs ==
The ELA's mission is to forge a future for languages. The organization's network is an extended family of linguists, language activists, community leaders, students, volunteers, and lovers of language in NYC and the world over. The organization works to support linguistic diversity through documentation, research, education and community engagement.

=== Documentation ===
A key aim of the alliance is to document endangered languages through various methods, including audio recordings, video recordings, and transcriptions. This documentation is used to create archives of endangered languages and to develop teaching and learning materials.

One such project is the "Voices of the Himalayas" project, which recorded speakers of Mustangi and Kyirong, among other Tibetan languages. ELA has also worked to document Garifuna and Mamuju. Another volunteer project aimed to collect P'urhépecha literature, digitize it, and translate it into English and Spanish.

=== Research ===
Additionally, work is undertaken to support research on endangered languages through grants and fellowships. This research helps to better understand the structure and function of endangered languages and to develop strategies for language revitalization.

ELA has undertaken a language census to determine the number of languages spoken in New York City, estimating them at around 800, with Queens as the most linguistically diverse burough. They have published data on the city's languages and released a map showing where each language is spoken.

=== Education ===
The ELA also offers a variety of educational programs on endangered languages, including workshops, seminars, and conferences. These programs are designed to raise awareness of endangered languages and to provide training in language documentation and revitalization.

ELA was involved with David Grubin's documentary Language Matters with Bob Holman, which was released in January 2015 through PBS.

=== Community engagement ===
The organization works with communities of speakers of endangered languages to support their efforts to revitalize their languages. This support includes providing funding for language programs, developing teaching and learning materials, and promoting the use of endangered languages in public spaces. Some such projects have included Lenape classes (in 2017 and 2018), a Nahuatl podcast and children's books in five Pamiri languages.

During the COVID-19 pandemic, the ELA helped to produce educational materials on tests, treatments, and vaccines in indigenous languages for residents of East Harlem. The work was financed by a grant from the New York City Department of Health and Mental Hygiene. The ELA also organized the "Diaries from the Epicenter" project, in which speakers of Himalayan (Amdolese, Loke, Tibetan, Dolpo, Dzongkha, Yolmo, Nepali) and indigenous American (including Me’phaa, Mixtec, and K’iche’) endangered languages shared their thoughts on quarantine and gave advice.

ELA also is able to broadcast radio, allowing for the airing of such programs as the volunteer-hosted ALCAL (Latin and Central American Linguists) radio and Voces sin Frontera, a program in Spanish, K’iche’, Totonac, and Kichwa.

== In media ==
The Endangered Language Alliance was featured in the book Language City by Ross Perlin, the organization's co-director. The book discusses the rich linguistic history of New York, from the Lenape word Manaháhtaan to present-day minority languages. In the book, Perlin visits a six-story apartment building in Flatbush that has been the home of about 100 speakers of Seke, a Tibetan-Burman language which is spoken by just 700 people in the world.

== See also ==
- Jewish Language Project
