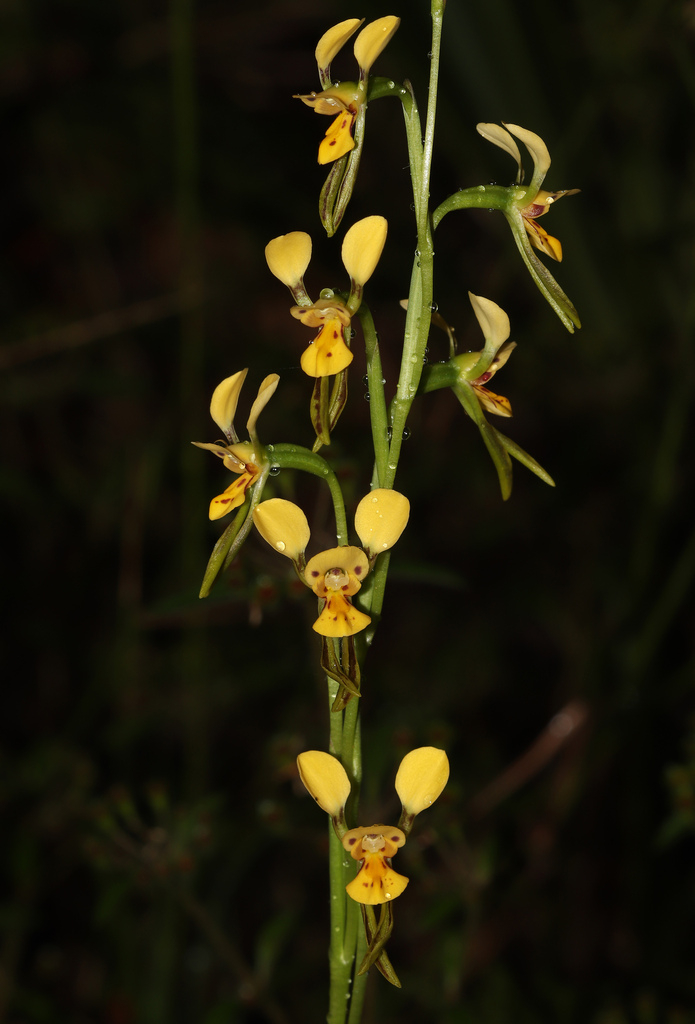

Scientific classification
- Kingdom: Plantae
- Clade: Tracheophytes
- Clade: Angiosperms
- Clade: Monocots
- Order: Asparagales
- Family: Orchidaceae
- Subfamily: Orchidoideae
- Tribe: Diurideae
- Genus: Diuris
- Species: D. disposita

Binomial name
- Diuris disposita D.L.Jones

= Diuris disposita =

Macleay River doubletail

Species of orchid

Diuris disposita, commonly called the Macleay River doubletail or Willawarrin doubletail, is a species of orchid which is endemic to a small area in New South Wales. It has one or two linear leaves at its base and up to seven yellow flowers with brown markings. Only about fifty plants survive in grassy forest near Kempsey.

== Description ==
Diuris disposita is a tuberous, perennial herb with usually only one linear leaf 150–300 mm (6–10 in) long and 4–5 mm (0.2–0.2 in) wide. Between two and seven yellow flowers with brown markings, 20 mm (0.8 in) wide are borne on a flowering stem 200–350 mm (8–10 in) tall. The dorsal sepal projects forward and is egg-shaped, 7–11 mm (0.3–0.4 in) long and 4–7 mm (0.2–0.3 in) wide. The lateral sepals are linear to sword-shaped, green and brownish, 10–24 mm (0.4–0.9 in) long, about 2 mm (0.08 in) wide, turned downwards and parallel to, or crossed over each other. The petals are more or less erect, spread apart from each other with an elliptic to egg-shaped blade 6–9 mm (0.2–0.4 in) long and 4.5–6.5 mm (0.2–0.3 in) wide on a green stalk 4–7 mm (0.2–0.3 in) long. The labellum is 7–9 mm (0.3–0.4 in) long and has three lobes. The centre lobe is egg-shaped, 4–7 mm (0.2–0.3 in) wide and the side lobes are linear to oblong, 2–3 mm (0.08–0.1 in) long and about 1 mm (0.04 in) wide. There are two ridge-like calli about 4.5 mm (0.18 in) long near the base of the mid-line of the base of the labellum. Flowering occurs in September and October.

== Taxonomy and naming ==
Diuris disposita was first formally described in 1991 by David Jones from a specimen collected about 18 km (11 mi) north-west of Kempsey and the description was published in Australian Orchid Research. The specific epithet (disposita) is a Latin word meaning "distributed" or "arranged", referring to the widely spaced flowers on the flowering stem.

== Distribution and habitat ==
The Macleay River doubletail grows in grassy open forest near the Macleay River north-west of Kempsey.

== Conservation ==
Diuris disposita is classified as "endangered" under the New South Wales Biodiversity Conservation Act 2016. The main threats to the species are illegal collecting, habitat destruction and inappropriate fire regimes. Fewer than fifty plants are known, none in a conservation reserve.
