= Loretta Kelly =

Law Academic

- Education: Southern Cross University
- Scientific career
- Workplaces: Southern Cross University
- Thesis: Stumbling Block to Stepping Stone: Learning from our experience of native title mediation in the development of a process of Aboriginal dispute resolution. (2007)

Loretta Kelly is an Australian Aboriginal law academic, specialising in Aboriginal dispute resolution.

She is of Gumbaynggirr and Dungutti descent and has traditional land at Corindi.

She is currently a senior lecturer at Southern Cross University.

== Selected works ==
- Indigenous Human Rights
- Resolving Indigenous Disputes - Land conflict and beyond
