= Georges Creek (Armidale Dumaresq) =

River in Australia

Coordinates: 30°40′S 152°13′E

Georges Creek Georges River, Upper Georges Creek

Location
- Country: Australia
- State: New South Wales
- Region: New England Tablelands (IBRA), Northern Tablelands, Mid North Coast
- Local government area: Armidale

Physical characteristics
- Source: Snowy Range, Great Dividing Range
  - location: near Ebor
  - elevation: 1,330 m (4,360 ft)
- Mouth: confluence with the Macleay River
  - location: at the locality of Georges Creek
  - elevation: 134 m (440 ft)
- Length: 53 km (33 mi)

Basin features
- River system: Macleay River catchment
- National parks: New England NP, Cunnawarra NP

The Georges Creek (formerly known as Georges River), a perennial stream that is part of the Macleay River catchment, is located in the Northern Tablelands and Mid North Coast regions of New South Wales, Australia.

== Course and features ==
Georges Creek rises below Point Lookout, on the western slopes of the Snowy Range, part of the Great Dividing Range, about 12 kilometres (7.5 mi) south by east of Ebor, within the New England National Park. The river flows generally to the south southwest before reaching its confluence with the Macleay River at the rural locality of Georges Creek, 7 kilometres (4.3 mi) west southwest of Lower Creek, situated on the Armidale Kempsey Road. The river descends 1,200 metres (3,900 ft) over its 53 kilometres (33 mi) course.

== See also ==
- Rivers of New South Wales
- List of rivers of New South Wales (A-K)
- List of rivers of Australia
