= Ross Perlin =

American linguist

- Born: 1982 or 1983; New York City
- Education: Stanford University (BA) University of Cambridge (Phil) University of London (MA) University of Bern (PhD)
- Occupation: Linguist
- Known for: Language City: The Fight to Preserve Endangered Mother Tongues in New York

Ross Perlin (born 1982 or 1983) is an American linguist and co-director of the Endangered Language Alliance. He has made significant contributions to the Languages of New York City map.

== Early life and education ==
Perlin is a descendent of Yiddish-speaking Jewish immigrants and a fourth-generation New Yorker. He grew up in Manhattan, moving away from the city at age 15.

Perlin has a BA from Stanford University, an M.Phil. from the University of Cambridge, an MA from the University of London (SOAS), and a PhD in Linguistics from the University of Bern. During his studies, he lived in Beijing for six months, where he focused on learning Chinese. For his PhD, he worked in southwest China with a Trung-speaking community, producing "a trilingual dictionary, a corpus of recordings, and a descriptive grammar".

== Career ==
As part of his linguistics PhD, Perlin studied and published a dictionary for Trung, a language spoken in the eastern Himalayas. Perlin researched the languages of the Pamir region of Tajikistan for National Geographic.

By 2012, Perlin was working with as an assistant director for the Endangered Language Alliance and as the leader of the organization's Jewish languages project.

He is a lecturer in the Department of Slavic Languages at Columbia University.

=== Writing ===
During his PhD, Perlin published Intern Nation, an expose about the inequality of unpaid internships, in 2011.

Perlin contributed to the English translation of Bullets and Opium: Real-Life Stories of China After the Tiananmen Square Massacre (2020) by Liao Yiwu and Chen Guangcheng's The Barefoot Lawyer (2015).

In 2024, Perlin published Language City, an exploration of the least-known languages in New York City. In this, he places a focus on trauma as the source for linguistic diversity in New York, especially that of immigrants fleeing persecution, violence, and famine. An excerpt from the book was published in The Atlantic, highlighting the likelihood that many endangered languages will die out in the near future. He wrote, "Threats to immigration and immigrant lives, language loss in the homelands, and the gentrification of cities appear to be accelerating the cycle.

Some journalists have speculated that a New York Times article highlighting Perlin's work may have inspired an anti-immigrant comment by President Donald Trump.

== Personal life ==
Perlin moved back to New York City in 2011, and lives in Ridgewood, Queens as of 2024. He married his wife, Cecil, in 2024. He is Jewish.

== Publications ==
=== Books ===
- Intern Nation: How to Earn Nothing and Learn Little in the Brave New Economy (Verso Books, 2012)
- Language City: The Fight to Preserve Endangered Mother Tongues in New York (Atlantic Monthly Press, 2024)

=== Chapters ===
- Kaufman, Daniel; Perlin, Ross (2018-07-18). "Language Documentation in Diaspora Communities". In Rehg, Kenneth L.; Campbell, Lyle (eds.). The Oxford Handbook of Endangered Languages. Oxford University Press. ISBN 978-0-19-087704-0.

=== Articles ===
- Perlin, Ross (April 2009). "Linguistics of the Tibeto-Burman Area". Linguistics of the Tibeto-Burman Area. 32 (1). John Benjamins Publishing Company: 91–113.
- Perlin, Ross (March 2013). "Chinese Workers Foxconned". Dissent. 60 (2): 46–52. doi:10.1353/dss.2013.0024. ISSN 1946-0910.
- Perlin, Ross (June 2014). "Radical Linguistics in an Age of Extinction". Dissent. 61 (3): 70–75. doi:10.1353/dss.2014.0064. ISSN 1946-0910.
- Perlin, Ross (June 2015). "Two Occupys: The New Global Language of Protest". Dissent. 62 (3): 92–100. doi:10.1353/dss.2015.0054. ISSN 1946-0910.

== Honors and awards ==
- Forward 50 (2012), The Forward
- New York Jewish Week's 36 to Watch (2024)
- 2024 British Academy Book Prize, for Language City
