= Homewood, Bellbrook =

House and farm in New South Wales, Australia

Homewood - Childhood Home of 'Slim Dusty'
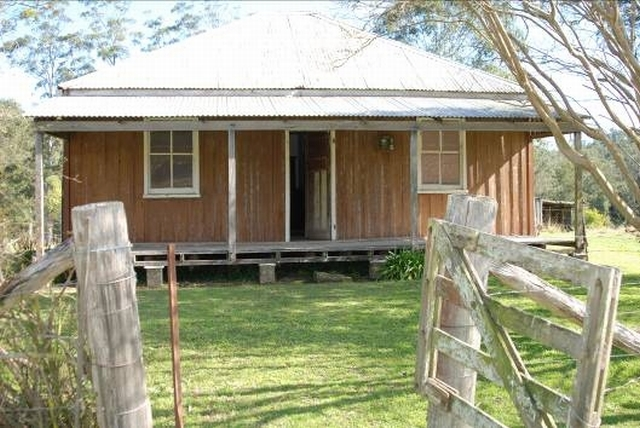

- Location within New South Wales Location within Australia
- 30.7285°S 152.4975°E
- Location: 1279 Nulla Nulla Creek Road, Bellbrook, Kempsey Shire, New South Wales, Australia

History
- Built: 1915–1916

Site notes
- Architect: David Kirkpatrick
- Owner: Joy McKean Kirkpatrick

New South Wales Heritage Register
- Official name: Homewood - Childhood Home of 'Slim Dusty'; Melody Farm
- Type: state heritage (complex / group)
- Designated: 27 January 2012
- Reference no.: 1870
- Type: Dairy
- Category: Farming and Grazing
- Builders: David Kirkpatrick and Thomas Ryan

Homewood is a heritage-listed house and farm at 1279 Nulla Nulla Creek Road, Bellbrook, in the Mid North Coast region of New South Wales, Australia. It was the childhood home of country music singer Slim Dusty. It was designed by his father, David Kirkpatrick, and built from 1915 to 1916 by Kirkpatrick and Thomas Ryan. It is also known as Melody Farm. The property is now owned by Slim Dusty's widow, Joy McKean Kirkpatrick. It was added to the New South Wales State Heritage Register on 27 January 2012.

== History ==
Homewood was built in 1915-16 by David Kirkpatrick, with the help of a neighbour, Thomas Ryan. From 1927, it was home to David Gordon Kirkpatrick, the youngest child and only surviving son of David Kirkpatrick and Mary Partridge.

The Nulla Nulla Valley, with its close-knit community, had strong musical traditions among the hardworking families dotted along the meandering banks of the creek. A large number of its residents, both men and women, could play an instrument or sing. Dances and house parties were held "about every week", with the news of these events spreading up and down the valley via the "bush telegraph." Young Gordon Kirkpatrick was exposed to all of this music and composed his early songs on the property. By the mid-1950s, as "Slim Dusty", he left "the Nulla" to pursue a phenomenally successful showbusiness career.

In 1954, the property was sold to Eric Midgeley. A succession of Midgeley relatives and, subsequently, tenants occupied the place until 2003. In 2001 the Kirkpatrick family bought it back to serve as a lasting memorial to Slim Dusty's formative years. Since 2003, Homewood has been vacant.

== Description ==
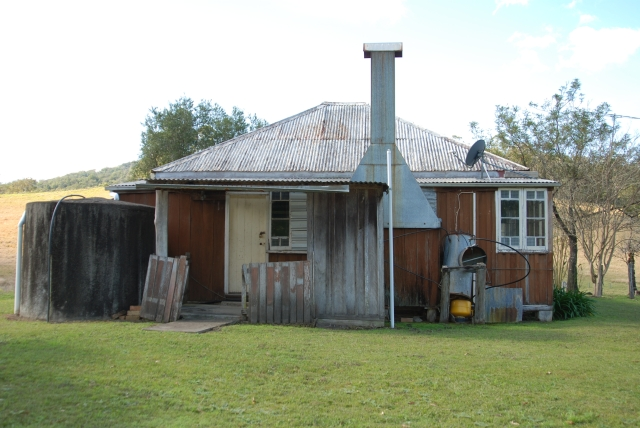
Rear of house

Homewood has a verandah to the front (facing east). The house is made of timber with an iron roof. The verandah (together with the roof) had some renovations done during 1980-82. There are two front windows facing out to the verandah. From the entrance hallway, there are two bedrooms, one on each side. The dining room (on the left) and third bedroom (on the right) are further down the hallway. A doorway from the dining room leads to the kitchen with adjoining bathroom. The open fire and stove are on the back wall of the kitchen with shelving to the left. There was no bathroom at first. The current bathroom was added in 1945 and located in a space occupied by the pantry.

Despite its simple structure and basic foundation material there has been little significant alteration to Homewood in its 90-odd years of existence. Homewood remains intact and is rich in its associations with the boyhood and growing up of Slim Dusty.

Homewood retains its original materials and features with little modification.

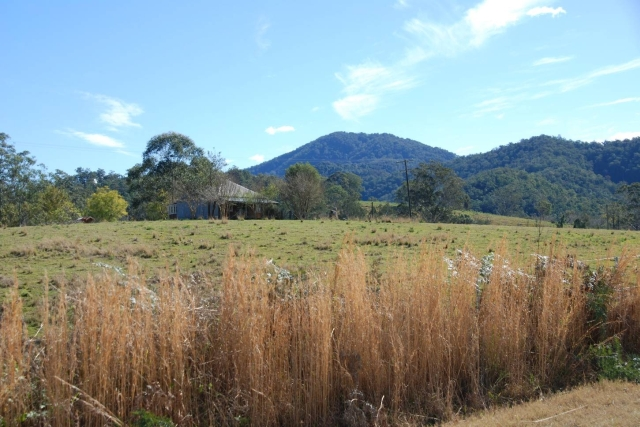
House within the context of the farm

=== Modifications and dates ===
Fences

The current fence was erected around the house 1980–82.

Tankstands and Iron Tank

The three tankstands pictured in the photographs dated 1978 were removed by the Rossiters when they purchased the property. The tankstands and iron tanks were replaced by a concrete tank in 1990.

Septic System

A septic system was installed in 1990.

Garden

The original garden has disappeared and replaced by new plantings. There are some surviving trees, bushes and fruit trees.

Cowbails

All that remains of the original cowbails is a cement slab where the eighteen-year-old Slim Dusty sat and wrote the song "The Rain Tumbles Down in July," in 1945. The replacement cowbails are still intact.

== Heritage listing ==
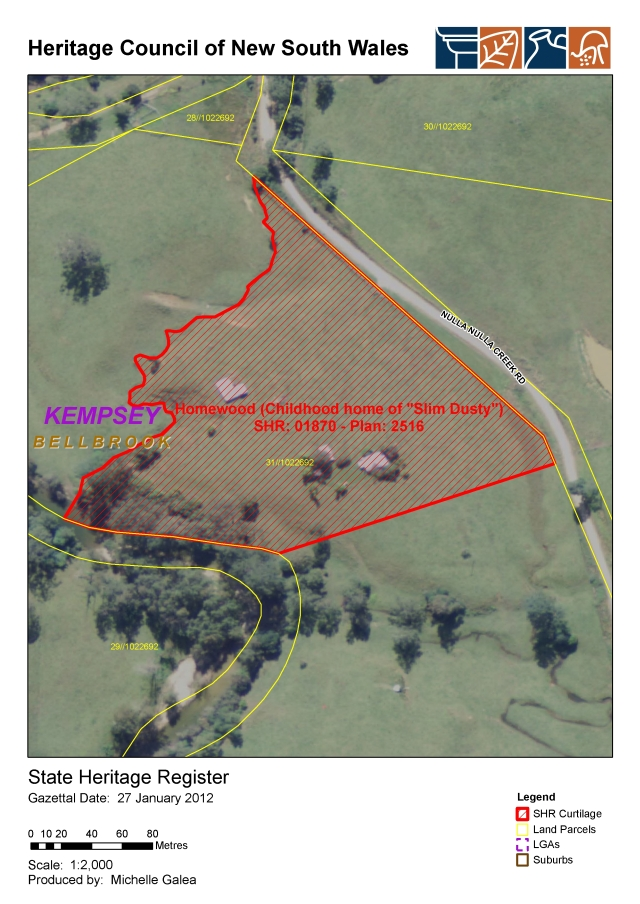
Heritage boundaries

Homewood is of State heritage significance for its associations with the formative years of country and western singer Slim Dusty (born David Gordon Kirkpatrick, 1927–2003). It demonstrates the frugal and simple nature of his boyhood and evokes the cultural and musical influences of the Nulla Nulla community and its bush environment that were the inspiration for his songs. Homewood reflects for a broad audience, both Australian and international, Slim Dusty's character and role as a significant musical and cultural creative figure.

Homewood was listed on the New South Wales State Heritage Register on 27 January 2012 having satisfied the following criteria.

The place is important in demonstrating the course, or pattern, of cultural or natural history in New South Wales.

Homewood and its setting are significant in the course of the cultural history of NSW for their ability to demonstrate the frugal and simple nature of Slim Dusty's childhood and formative years—a lifestyle and a landscape reflected in his character, compositions and performances throughout a long and successful career of iconic national significance.

The place has a strong or special association with a person, or group of persons, of importance of cultural or natural history of New South Wales's history.

Homewood is of state significance for its association with the life and work of Gordon Kirkpatrick ('Slim Dusty') a musician, composer and performer of national stature.

The place is important in demonstrating aesthetic characteristics and/or a high degree of creative or technical achievement in New South Wales.

Homewood is locally significant as an example of a small wood and iron house which was the main residence of small dairy farmers and of which Homewood is the only original remaining significant example along and by the Nulla Nula Creek.

The place has strong or special association with a particular community or cultural group in New South Wales for social, cultural or spiritual reasons.

Homewood is socially significant at a state level in its ability to evoke for a broad audience both Australian and international, Slim Dusty's character and role as a significant musical and cultural creative figure. The place is held in high esteem by Australians who revere Slim Dusty and his music.

The place is important in demonstrating the principal characteristics of a class of cultural or natural places/environments in New South Wales.

Homewood is locally significant as a representative example of working class housing built by small dairy farmers on the Upper Macleay from the 1890s through to 1950. It used local timber plus mass-produced materials such as corrugated iron. It is a modest timber dwelling with its original tankstand and clothesline out the back still intact. Homewood is similar to the early buildings on outlying stations which were often replaced by more substantial houses once families became more prosperous. The nearby village of Bellbrook (a National Trust Heritage Village) has surviving houses and buildings of similar construction.

== See also ==
Bellbrook, NSW

Slim Dusty

A Pub with No Beer
