= Gumbaynggirr =

Australian Aboriginal group of the area contiguous with Coffs Harbour, NSW

The Gumbaynggirr people, also rendered Kumbainggar, Gumbangeri and other variant spellings, are an Aboriginal Australian people of the Mid North Coast of New South Wales. Gumbathagang was a probable clan or sub-group. The traditional lands of the Gumbaynggirr nation stretch from Tabbimoble Yamba-Clarence River to Ngambaa-Stuarts Point, SWR- Macleay to Guyra and to Oban.

== History ==
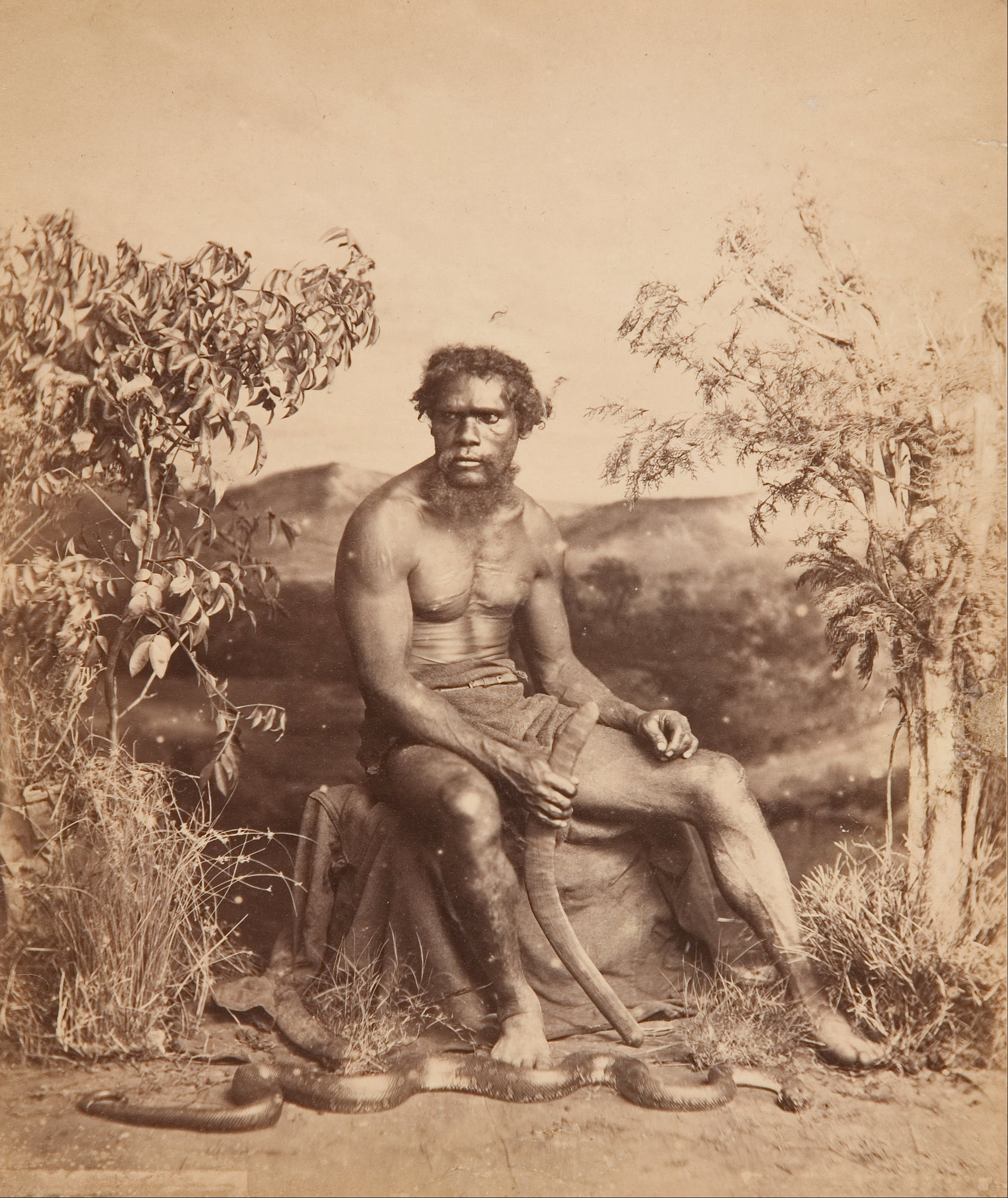
Portrait of an Aboriginal man (c. 1873-1874), by J W. Lindt

Clement Hodgkinson was the first European to make contact with the local Aboriginal community when he explored the upper reaches of the Nambucca and Bellinger Rivers in March 1841. Three decades later, loggers began to work their way up through the Orara River cedar stands in the 1870s. Over c.1873-1874, J.W. Lindt produced photographs of local indigenous people both in their environment and conducting actual traditional ceremonies in the Clarence River district, and made portraits in his studio. Contemporary commentary records them as "the first successful attempt at representing the native blacks truthfully as well as artistically." The Sydney Morning Herald, of 24 November 1874 expanded on what made the photographs attractive to Europeans:

There is no settled portion of our colony which affords a better field for the study of aboriginal bush life than that presented by our northern rivers, for there – although decreasing yearly in numbers as their territories become more settled upon by white population – the local original inhabitants preserve their customs and traditions, adhering more closely to true aboriginal life than tribes in other districts of New South Wales, and Mr Lindt can be complimented upon the artistic use he has made of the rugged subjects he has had at his disposal.

The report clearly sets out a cynical nostalgia for the traditional ways of these people made sentimental by noting their 'decreasing numbers', expressing a common attitude amongst the colonists that the Indigenous populations were doomed. However, the individuals in Lindt's group portraits and their clans and languages (Gumbaynggirr and Bandjalung), are not named, the 'scenery' is generic, and the accessories not those of the people depicted.

In clearing the land, the loggers opened up the prospect of selectors to squat on the tribal territories in the early 1880s. Soon after, in that same decade, a shepherd was murdered in the area and a hunting party was dispatched to exact revenge, resulting in the Red Rock Massacre. The slaughter started at Blackadder Creek where the Gumbaynggirr were camping. Mounted troopers entered the camp and began shooting. Those who fled were tracked down to the Corindi Creek where more were shot. Those who survived were driven to the headland and herded off the rocks into the sea. The hunters kept shooting at the swimmers, but some hid in a cave and made their way to Corindi Lake further south. One of the survivors was the present day elder Tony Perkins' grandmother, who crouched down in a thicket of bulrushes with a child in her arms.

After a court battle lasting two decades, the Gumbaynggirr claim to much of the reserve around the site in 2014 was confirmed by the New South Wales Land and Environment Court.

Many Aboriginal reserves and missions were established in NSW by the Aboriginal Protection Board. This resulted in relocation of Aboriginal people from their ancestral homes, only to be returned later after years of trauma (the Stolen Generations)

The Gumbaynggirr have the largest midden-shell deposit in the Southern Hemisphere.

== Country ==
The Gumbaynggirr lands extend over an estimated 2,300 square miles (6,000 km^{2}), covering an area of the Mid North Coast from the Nambucca River to as far north as the Clarence River (Grafton), and eastward to the Pacific coast. Norman Tindale specified its limits as bounded by the lower course of Nymboida River, stating that the territory ran toward Urunga, Coffs Harbour, and Bellingen. It included South Grafton and Glenreagh. It took in the coastal strip south from near One Tree Point, Woolgoolga and Nambucca Heads. The thin coastal zone from Coffs Harbour to Evans Head was Yaygir territory.

To their north were the twenty groups speaking various dialects of the Bandjalang. The Jukambal were to their west and the Nganyaywana/Anēwan in the environs of (Armidale). Their southern boundaries met with those of the Djangadi and Ngamba.

== Language ==
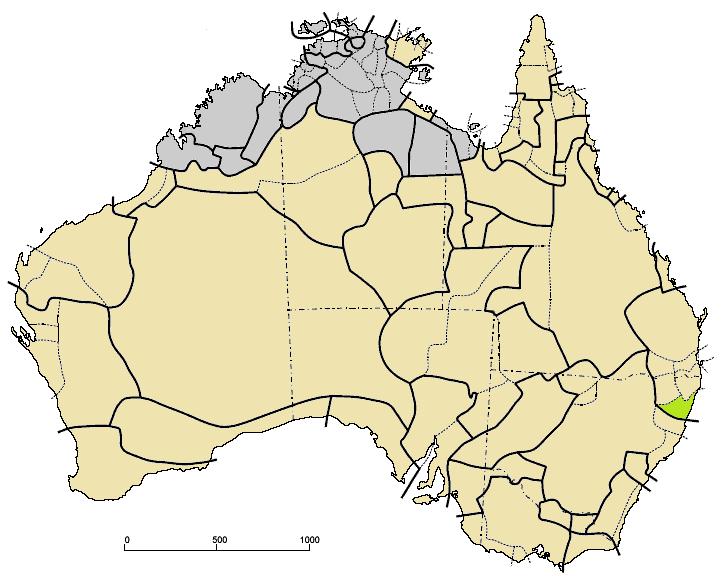
Gumbaynggiric languages in green

Gumbaynggir is classified as one of the two Gumbaynggiric languages of the Pama–Nyungan family. In 1986, the Muurrbay Aboriginal Language and Culture Co-operative was established by Gumbaynggirr elders to revive their language and hand it on. Language classes began in 1997, and by 2010, some several hundred people had some partial grasp of the language.

== Culture ==
Muurrbay in Gumbaynggir means the white fig tree and plays an important part in the Gumbaynggir Yuludarla (Gumbaynggir Dreamings).

The Gumbaynggirr made sweets (bush lollies, called jaaning) (Note: the word is said by Gumbaynggir restaurateur Clayton Donovan to be pronounced jasrnee) by rolling tender shoots from the Acacia irrorata in the sap oozing from the tree.

== Alternative names ==
- Coombagoree, Gumbanggar
- Coombangree, Coombyngura, Coombyngara, Coombargaree, Kombinegherry
- Gumbainggar, Gunbainggar, Gumbaingar, Guinbainggiri
- Gumbangeri
- Kombaingheri, Kombinegherry, Kumbangerai, Koombanggary, Koombanggherry, Koombainga

=== Possible clans or sub-tribes ===
- Gumbathagang, under "King Robert" in the late 19th century (aka "King Bobby" "King Malawangi", or Bobby/Billy King)
- Nimboy (a horde)
- Orara (name of a river)
- Woolgoolga (a horde)

== Notable people ==
- Frank Archibald, after whom the Frank Archibald Memorial Lecture Series was named
- Aretha Brown, youth activist
- Troy Cassar-Daley, country music singer-songwriter from Halfway Creek/Grafton NSW
- Emma Donovan, singer and songwriter (Gumbaynggirr heritage from mother's side)
- Gary Foley, activist, academic, writer and actor
- Albert Kelly, rugby league player
- Tasman Keith, hip hop artist
- Loretta Kelly, law academic
- Aden Ridgeway, former Australian Senator

== Sources ==
- "13/01/10: Call to an Aboriginal Summit in Australia". WGAR: Working Group for Aboriginal Rights (Australia). 13 January 2010. Archived from the original on 11 April 2010.
- Annear, Judy; Donohue, Robyn; Tunnicliffe, Wayne; Velez, Silvia (1997). Portraits of Oceania. The Art Gallery of New South Wales. ISBN 978-0-7313-1003-6.
- Baymarrwan̦a, Laurie; James, Bentley; Lydon, Jane (2014). Calling the shots: aboriginal photographies. Aboriginal Studies Press. ISBN 978-1-922059-59-8.
- "The Clarence Valley Photographs by John William Lindt: Grafton Regional Gallery". Grafton Regional Gallery. Archived from the original on 15 May 2022.
- Eades, Diana (1979). "Gumbaynggir". In Dixon, Robert M. W.; Blake, Barry J. (eds.). Handbook of Australian Languages. Vol. 1. John Benjamins Publishing. pp. 243–360. ISBN 978-9-027-20512-4.
- Ennis, Helen (2007). Photography and Australia. Reaktion Books. ISBN 978-1-86189-323-9.
- "First Nations' culture recognised in playground naming poll". Mirage News. 19 February 2020.
- "Frank Archibald". University of New England. n.d.
- Grewal, Jessica (1 February 2014). "Aboriginal Land Council wins claim on Red Rock reserve". The Daily Examiner.
- Hobson, John Robert (2010). Re-awakening Languages: Theory and Practice in the Revitalisation of Australia's Indigenous Languages. Sydney University Press. ISBN 978-1-920-89955-4.
- Hughes-d'Aeth, Tony (2001). Paper nation: the story of the Picturesque atlas of Australasia 1886 - 1888. Melbourne University Press. ISBN 978-0-522-84949-3.
- "Indigenous History". Armidale Regional Council. 11 June 2020.
- Kijas, Johanna (June 2009). There were always people here: a history of Yuraygir National Park (PDF). Department of Environment and Climate Change, New South Wales. ISBN 978-1-741-22866-3.
- ""King Sized" Aboriginal Chief saw coming of the white man" (PDF). Dawn. December 1962 – via AIATSIS.
- Konishi, Shino (2015). Konishi, Shino; Nugent, Maria; Shellam, Tiffany Sophie Bryden (eds.). Indigenous intermediaries: new perspectives on exploration archives. ANU Press. ISBN 978-1-925022-76-6.
- Lunney, Daniel; Wells, Antares; Miller, Indrie (2016). "An ecological history of the Koala Phascolarctos cinereus in Coffs Harbour and its environs, on the mid-north coast of New South Wales, c.1861-2000". Proceedings of the Linnean Society of New South Wales: 1–48.
- "Muurrbay". Muurrbay Aboriginal Language and Culture Co-operative. 2016.
- Newton, John (2016). The Oldest Foods on Earth: A History of Australian Native Foods with Recipes. NewSouth. ISBN 978-1-742-24226-2.
- Prentis, Malcolm David (2011). Concise Companion to Aboriginal History. Rosenberg. ISBN 978-1-921-71961-5.
- Somerville, Margaret; Hartley, Laura (2013). "A Space In-between: Red Rock". Journal of the Association for the Study of Australian Literature: 142–148.
- Somerville, Margaret; Perkins, Tony (2010). Singing the Coast. Aboriginal Studies Press. ISBN 978-0-855-75711-3.
- Stone, Derrick (2012). Walks, Tracks and Trails of New South Wales. Csiro Publishing. ISBN 978-0-643-10692-5.
- Tindale, Norman Barnett (1974). "Kumbainggiri (NSW)". Aboriginal Tribes of Australia: Their Terrain, Environmental Controls, Distribution, Limits, and Proper Names. Australian National University Press. ISBN 978-0-708-10741-6.
- Wright, Kate (30 November 2019). "Place Remembered: Unearthing Hidden Histories in Armidale Aboriginal Community Garden". Australian Humanities Review.
