= British Academy Book Prize for Global Cultural Understanding =

The British Academy Book Prize for Global Cultural Understanding is a prize granted by the British Academy for "outstanding scholarly contributions to global cultural understanding". The prize is £25,000.

It was created in 2013 as the Nayef Al-Rodhan Prize for Transcultural Understanding and then the Nayef Al-Rodhan Prize for Global Cultural Understanding, before becoming the British Academy Book Prize for Global Cultural Understanding in 2021.

== List of recipients ==
=== Nayef Al-Rodhan Prize for Transcultural Understanding ===
- 2013 Karen Armstrong, "in recognition of her body of work that has made a significant contribution to understanding the elements of overlap and commonality in different cultures and religions"
- 2014 Jonathan Jansen, University of the Free State, South Africa, for his book Knowledge in the Blood: Confronting Race and the Apartheid Past (2009)
- 2015 Neil MacGregor, British Museum, for his books A History of the World in 100 Objects (2010) and Germany: Memories Of A Nation (2014)
- 2016 Carole Hillenbrand, University of Edinburgh, for her book Islam: A New Historical Introduction (2015)

=== Nayef Al-Rodhan Prize for Global Cultural Understanding ===
- 2017 Timothy Garton Ash, University of Oxford, for his book Free Speech: Ten Principles for a Connected World (2016)
- 2018 Kapka Kassabova for her book Border: A Journey to the Edge of Europe
- 2019 Toby Green for his book A Fistful of Shells: West Africa from the Rise of the Slave Trade to the Age of Revolution
- 2020 Hazel V. Carby for her book Imperial Intimacies: A Tale of Two Islands

=== British Academy Book Prize ===
- 2021 Sujit Sivasundaram for Waves Across the South: A New History of Revolution and Empire
- 2022 Alia Trabucco Zerán for When Women Kill: Four Crimes Retold
- 2023 Nandini Das for Courting India: England, Mughal India and Origins of Empire
- 2024 Ross Perlin for Language City: The Fight To Preserve Endangered Mother Tongues
- 2025 Sunil Amrith for The Burning Earth: An Environmental History of the Last 500 Years
