= Blue Mountain Creek =

Location
- Country: Australia
- State: New South Wales
- Region: New England Tablelands (IBRA), Northern Tablelands
- Local government area: Armidale

Physical characteristics
- Source: Blue Mountains
  - location: near Walcha and Uralla
  - coordinates: 30.83594°S 151.70131°E
  - elevation: 1,090 m (3,580 ft)
- Mouth: confluence with the Macleay River
  - coordinates
  - elevation: 254 m (833 ft)
- Length: 41 km (25 mi)

Basin features
- River system: Macleay River catchment
- Tributaries
  - right: Winterbourne Creek, Hole Creek
- National park: Oxley Wild Rivers NP

The Blue Mountain Creek, an intermittent stream that is part of the Macleay River catchment, is located in the Northern Tablelands region of New South Wales, Australia.

== Course and features ==
Blue Mountain Creek rises on the eastern slopes of Blue Mountain, north northeast of Walcha and south southeast of Uralla, within the Great Dividing Range. The river flows generally east, joined by two minor tributaries before reaching its confluence with the Macleay River in the remote country within the Oxley Wild Rivers National Park, upstream of the confluence of the Macleay and Chandler rivers. The river descends 838 metres (2,749 ft) over its 41 kilometres (25 mi) course.

== See also ==
- Rivers of New South Wales
- List of rivers of New South Wales (A-K)
- List of rivers of Australia
