= Frederickton, New South Wales =

Frederickton
- Town
- Coordinates: 31°02′S 152°52′E
- Country: Australia
- State: New South Wales
- LGA: Kempsey Shire
- Location: 436 km (271 mi) from Sydney
- Established: 1911

Population
  - Total: 1,195 (2021 census)
- Postcode: 2440
- County: Dudley
- Parish: Yarrabandini

Frederickton is a town on the Macleay River, New South Wales. Located about 6 km NE by N of Kempsey and about 7 km W by S of Smithtown. It is roughly 436 kilometres north of Sydney. The Macleay Valley Bridge, the longest bridge on the Pacific Highway commences just to the East of town.

== History ==
Frederickton was named after Frederick William Chapman. In a manuscript he wrote about his life on the Macleay River called Early Days on the Macleay 1836-1908 "I decided to subdivide a small portion of my property into township lots and call it Frederickton…they sold very well and a nice little village had soon formed."

He had surveyed the 170 acres for sub division. The locality had been the site of a ship building, this town was based around ship building, timber getting and pastoral pursuits.

Historical population
Year	Pop.	±%
1966	526	—
1971	552	+4.9%
1976	611	+10.7%
1981	616	+0.8%
1986	726	+17.9%
1991	826	+13.8%
1996	881	+6.7%
2001	899	+2.0%
2006	986	+9.7%
2011	1,074	+8.9%
2016	1,136	+5.8%
2021	1,195	+5.2%
Source: Australian Bureau of Statistics data.
