= Dyangadi languages =

Pama–Nyungan language family of Australia

Dyangadi
- Macleay–New England
- Geographic distribution: New South Wales
- Linguistic classification: Pama–Nyungan: Dyangadi
- Subdivisions: Dyangadi; ?Nganyaywana

Language codes
- Glottolog: macl1239

Dyangadi is a possible small family of extinct or nearly extinct Australian Aboriginal languages of New South Wales:

- Dyangadi
  - Nganyaywana a.k.a. Anaiwan
  - Dyangadi a.k.a. Burgadi

They were once included among the Kuric languages.

However, Bowern (2011) retains Dyangadi in Kuric, removing only Nganyaywana as a separate Anewan branch.
