= Ngambaa =

Australian Aboriginal people

The Ngamba are an Australian Aboriginal people of New South Wales.

== Language ==
The Ngamba language is poorly described because little has been transmitted of its nature. It is generally believed to have been similar to Gumbaynggirr.

== Country ==
Ngamba territory comprised some 900 square miles (2,300 km^{2}) from Port Macquarie and the vicinity of Rollands Plains south to the Manning River. The inland extension has not been ascertained.

== People ==
A few remnants of the original tribe were attested as still living in 1929, when A.R. Radcliffe-Brown described them as lingering on with descendants of the Ngaku and Daingatti. According to the reminiscences of Harry Buchanan, they had been systematically and savagely exterminated by the Australian native police.

== Customs ==
The Ngamba exploited the mangrove species Avicennia marina for its bark in order to fashion their military shields.

== Alternative names ==
- Ngambar
- Ngeunbah

== Sources ==
- Duke, Norman C. (2006). Australia's Mangroves: The Authoritative Guide to Australia's Mangrove Parts. MER. ISBN 978-0-646-46196-0.
- Eades, Diana (1979). "Gumbayngirr". In Dixon, Robert M. W.; Blake, Barry J. (eds.). Handbook of Australian Languages. Vol. 1. Cambridge University Press. pp. 243–360. ISBN 978-0-708-10741-6.
- Radcliffe-Brown, A. R. (July–December 1929). "Notes on Totemism in Eastern Australia". The Journal of the Royal Anthropological Institute of Great Britain and Ireland. 59: 399–415. doi:10.2307/2843892. JSTOR 2843892.
- Tindale, Norman Barnett (1974). "Ngamba (NSW)". Aboriginal Tribes of Australia: Their Terrain, Environmental Controls, Distribution, Limits, and Proper Names. Australian National University Press. ISBN 978-0-708-10741-6.
