= May Yarrowick =

Australian mid-wife and nurse (1876–1949)

- Born: February 1876; Stoney Creek Station, New South Wales
- Died: 17 April 1949 (aged 73); Tingha, New South Wales
- Burial place: Bundarra Cemetery
- Occupations: Registered mid-wife and nurse
- Years active: c.1907-1947

May Yarrowick or May Yarrowyck (February 1876 - 17 April 1949) was an Australian midwife and registered nurse from the New England area of New South Wales. She is the earliest known Aboriginal woman to be a registered nurse.

== Early life ==
Yarrowick was an Anēwan woman born on her mother's country at the Stoney Creek Station near Bundarra. Her mother was Peg, whose Yarrowyck mother had given birth to her when her people had been staying near Stoney Creek. A local white woman, Catherine Kelly, had assisted with the birth. When Peg was 16 she gave birth to May, whose father was a member of the Kelly family. Peg died shortly after the birth. The child was adopted and raised by a relative, Honoria Kelly. She was given the last name Yarrowick after her mother's people, and raised with her cousins from the Kelly family.

== Career ==
Yarrowick was privately tutored with her cousins, and did very well at school. She was accepted to study obstetrics at the Crown Street Hospital, however she was segregated from the other nurses because she was Aboriginal, with the Matron writing to the board of the hospital:

"Matron re Pupil Nurse Yarrowick, it was decided that the fact of her being half caste was not a valid ground in refusing to train her as a nurse, a separate room would however be provided for her."

Yarrowick was a received her nursing certificate at the Women's hospital in May of 1907. She was registered with the Australasian Trained Nurses’ Association. She practiced as a midwife across the state of New South Wales, travelling by horseback to provide midwife services to women in isolated areas. Yarrowick was not technically under the authority of the Aborigines Protection Act 1909 (NSW), however, she still would have needed protection from the Kelly family to allow her the freedom to travel and to receive her education.

== Death and legacy ==
Yarrowick died on 17 April 1949 at Tingha Cottage Hospital where she had been being treated for 16 months.

The Inverell NAIDOC Week ceremony present the Aunt May Yarrowyck award, for outstanding achievements in all aspects of commitment and dedication to the community. The inaugural award was presented to Pauline Batholomew in 2014. It was awarded to Aunt Sue Blacklock in 2015.

There was a campaign in 2015 to name a new bridge constructed in Bundarra after Yarrowick.
