= Bellbrook, New South Wales =

Bellbrook
- Town
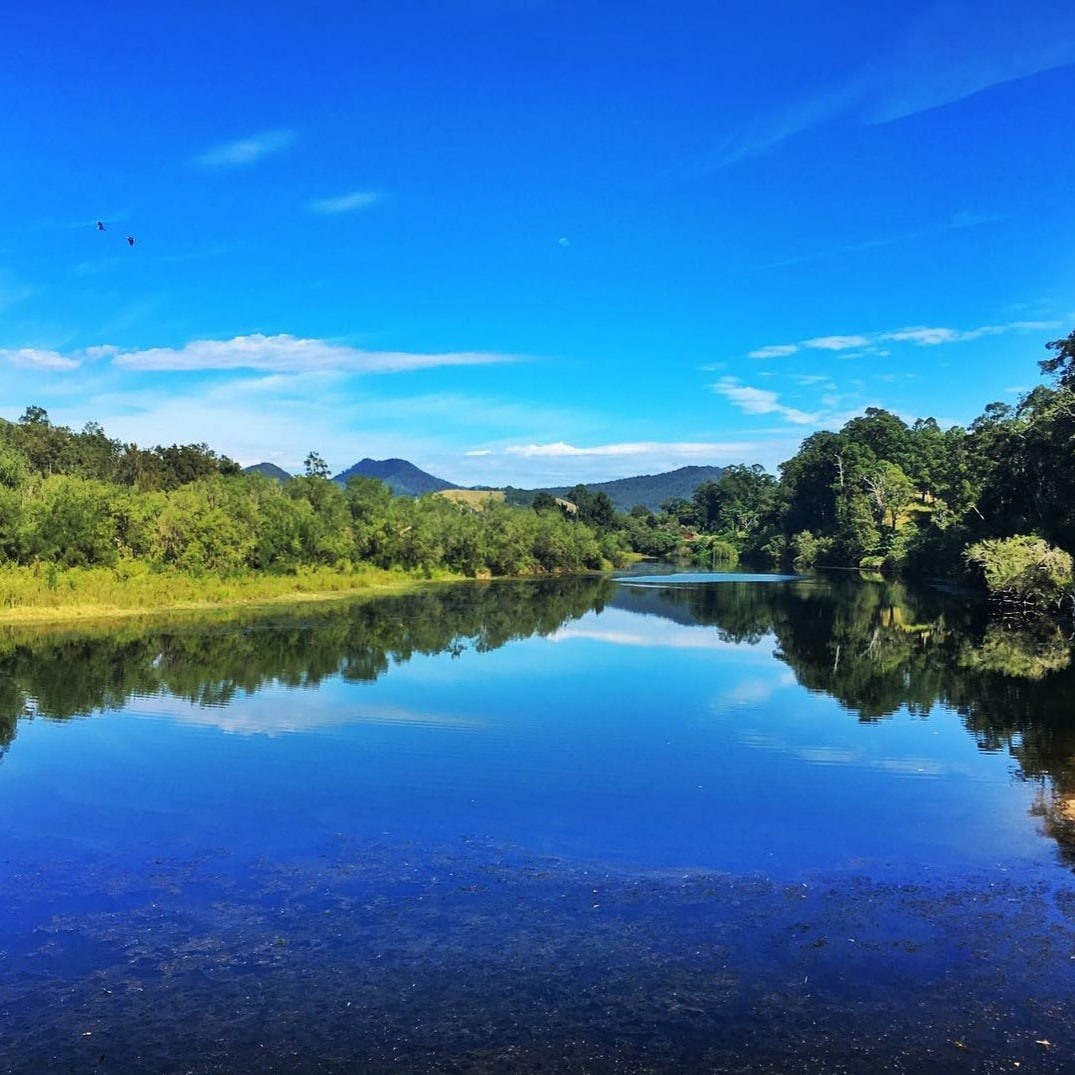

- Coordinates: 30°49′00″S 152°30′00″E
- Country: Australia
- State: New South Wales
- LGA: Kempsey Shire
- Location: 43 km (27 mi) NW of Kempsey

Government
  - State electorate: Oxley
  - Federal division: Cowper

Population
  - Total: 339 (2021 census)
- Postcode: 2440

Bellbrook is a locality in the Kempsey Shire of New South Wales, Australia along the Macleay River. The mountain village is classified by the National Trust as a heritage village and is part of the Macleay Valley Coast.

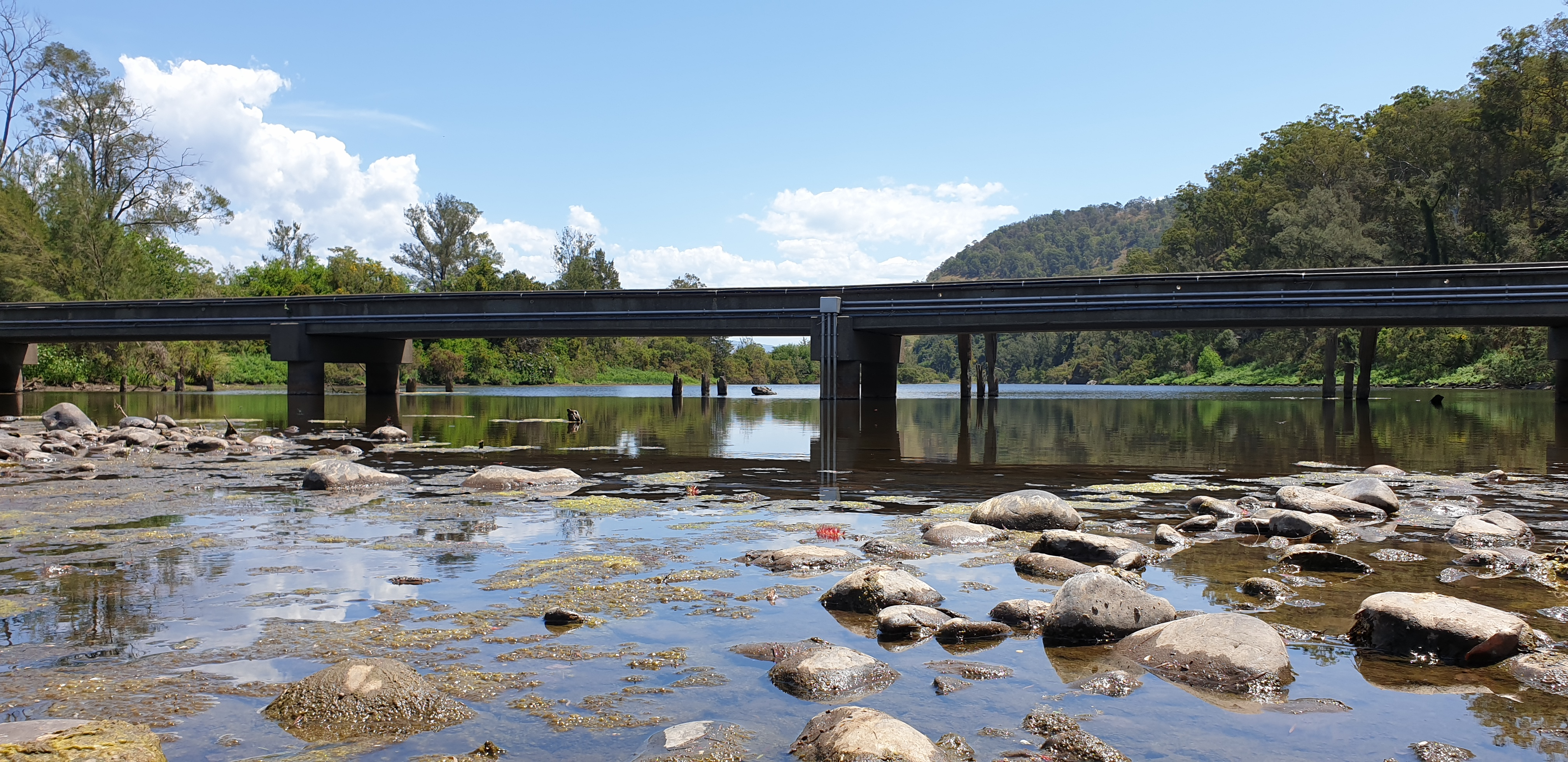
Bellbrook Bridge (low tide), Bellbrook NSW, Australia

== Population ==
Bellbrook had a population of 339 as of the 2021 census. An expansion of 21% from the 2016 census population of 273.

== Etymology ==
The town was laid out and gazetted as Bellbrook in 1892. Caroline McMaugh, wife of early settler John McMaugh, named the village. At that time, and still today, the distinctive call of bellbirds could be heard echoing through the dense scrub they inhabited along Nulla Nulla Creek.

In 1882, the name Bellbrook was first adopted as the official title for the original post office. A postal receiving office at Bellbrook opened on 16 January 1882, became a post office on 1 January 1884, and closed on 10 April 1987. The present day post office is located at Bellbrook Hotel.

== Climate ==
Located within the same post code as Crescent Head, Kempsey, Verges Creek and other unique coastal and hinterland townships, Bellbrook enjoys a humid, sub-tropical climate with hot, humid summers and cold winters with significant rainfall. Many locals utilise fireplaces during the colder months.

== History ==
=== Pre-History ===
Bellbrook is on the traditional lands of the Thunghutti Aboriginal people, some of whom continue to live on the local Aboriginal reserve.

=== Settlement ===
It was first settled by Europeans in the mid-1830s, and there was "very active antagonism" between the Europeans and the Thunghutti, which slowed the development of the village.

A 36.4-hectare (90-acre) Aboriginal reserve was established at Bellbrook in 1885. It was initially an unsupervised reserve, but was later managed by the Aboriginal Protection Board. Residents "came under intense government surveillance" from the APB and had to sign in and out. Many of the residents worked on local pastoral stations, generally poorly paid.

=== Bellbrook Hotel ===
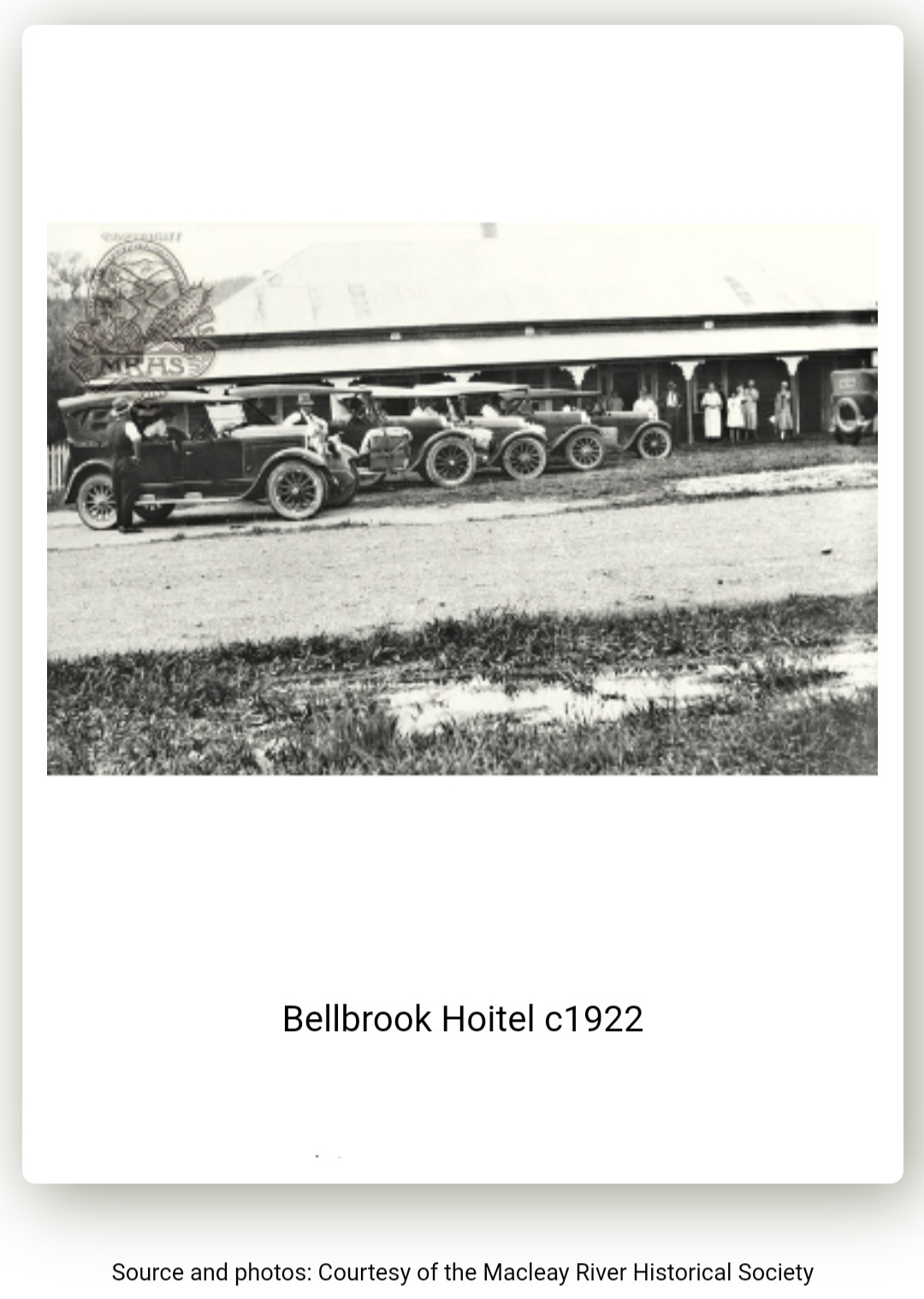
Bellbrook Hotel c1922

The Bellbrook Hotel overlooks the Macleay River. Opening in 1913, the Bellbrook Hotel is of historical significance, enjoying over one hundred years of service in addition to its notoriety as the watering hole of renowned Country Music Singer Slim Dusty. In 2018, the pub was nominated for the Best Bush Pub category in the Australian Hotels Association 2018 awards for excellence. In the same year, Bellbrook Hotel featured as one of twenty-five historic pubs in a travel book by the publisher of Australian Bush Pubs, titled, 'Historic Pubs, New South Wales'.

=== General Store ===
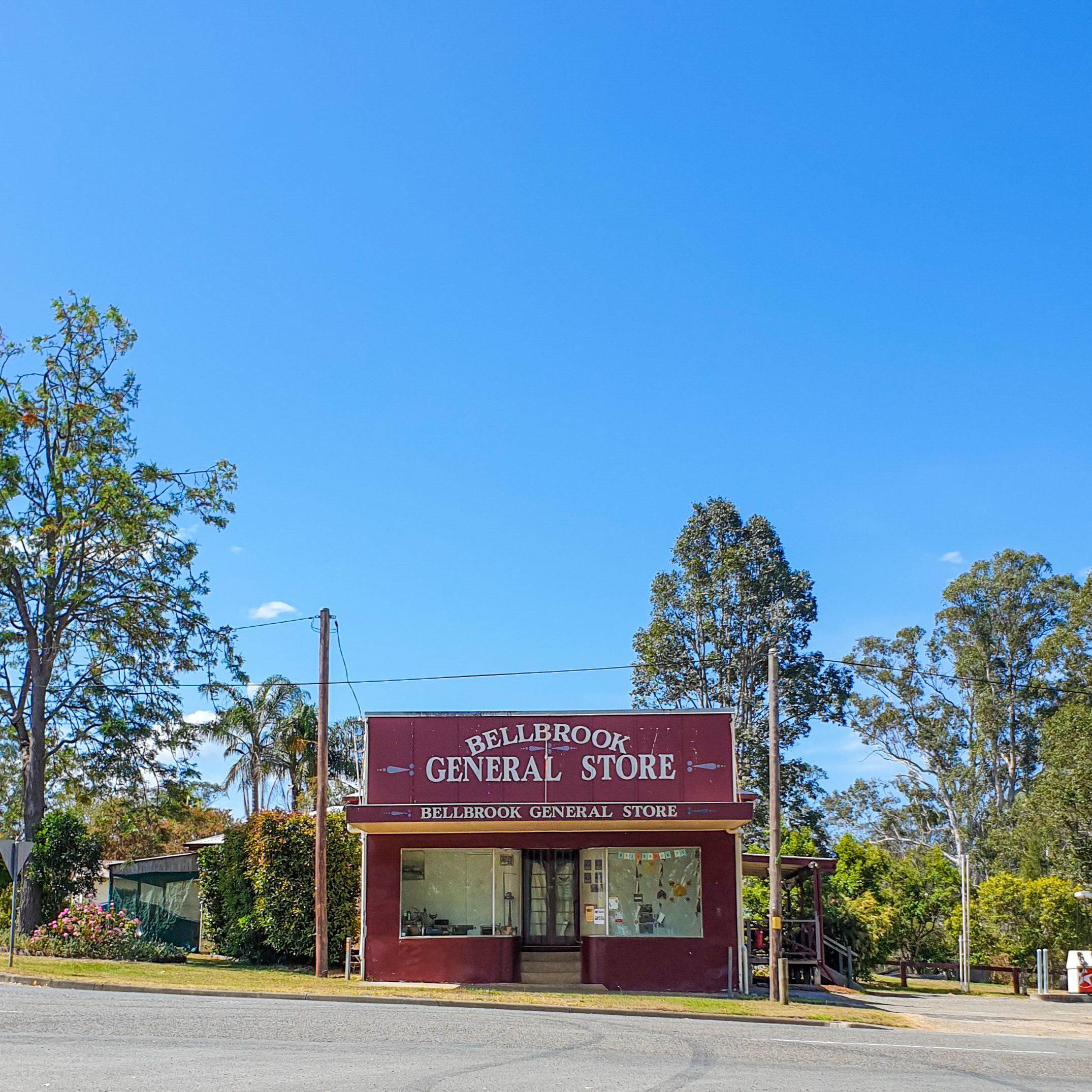
The iconic Bellbrook General Store

The Bellbrook General Store is located in Main Street, with the store and post office relocating to the Bellbrook Hotel in late 2019. It was the location of the Country Women's Association for many years in addition to catering for functions, meetings and local gatherings. The General Store is situated in the middle of the village, opposite the public school and Bellbrook Memorial Park.

=== Bellbrook School of Arts ===
The Bellbrook School of Arts was built circa 1922 and is opposite the General Store, Bellbrook Memorial Park and tennis courts.

=== Water ===
In 2005, the town's raw water supply was contaminated by heavy metals and arsenic from former mines in the Hillgrove area. In 2008, water was reportedly having to be trucked into the town because the supply was so contaminated. A new $700,000 water treatment plant was installed in 2009 to address the issue.

=== 2019-20 Bushfires ===
In November 2019, Bellbrook locals were forced to evacuate as their community was engulfed by the Carrai East fire which resulted in the loss of some homes. The Nulla Nulla Creek home of country music legend Slim Dusty was saved. Mobile phone coverage was lost in the mountain village with locals relying upon each other and the local Rural Fire Service for updates. Fires blocked the road to and from Bellbrook. Some locals stayed to prepare for the oncoming bushfire and created containment lines around their properties while other residents were forced to shelter at the local school. Locals were later able to leave under Emergency Service escort once the road was deemed safe.

In late November 2020, a travelling photograph exhibition titled, 'Black Summer and Beyond' was hosted at the Bellbrook School of Arts in commemoration of the bushfires.

== Culture ==
=== Art ===
Bellbrook's rich history and unique location has been the subject of many landscape artists, notably award-winning Kempsey born artist Les Graham and Stephen Franks (1942-2002).

The Bellbrook community embraces its Thunghutti Aboriginal roots. In December 2018, community members attended the official unveiling of its new sculpture “Wupu Manhatinum”- translation- 'Travelling Star', which now resides in the local park. The public artwork was dedicated to the late Aboriginal elder and artist, Aunty Esther Quinlin. The sculpture is part of the Dunghutti Story Trail – the Dhanggati Wirriyn Yapang project, which celebrates the Macleay Valley Coast’s significant cultural heritage and "-mark['s] the western gateway into Dunghutti country."

=== Music ===
Internationally renowned musician Slim Dusty was a Bellbrook local, growing up at Nulla Nulla Creek.

The community hold multiple annual and bi-annual events for locals and tourists, with a popular Upriver Drumming event held each month at the historic Bellbrook School of Arts Hall (Est. ~1922).

=== Vanlife Movement ===
Due to Bellbrook's untouched hinterland and close proximity to surf beaches such as Crescent Head, it is an increasingly popular destination for nature enthusiasts, either as residents or campers.

The growing 'Vanlife' movement and the subject of the 2019 film documentary 'The Meaning of Vanlife' held their 2016 gathering in Bellbrook NSW. The trip began with a Thunghutti Welcome to Country ceremony followed by stories and local history shared by camp-fire. The visit was facilitated by The YARN initiative with Desert Pea Media showcasing three locally produced films. Sibling music duo VanderAa performed for the trip.

== Activities ==
=== Bellbrook Hotel ===
The heart of the village, the Bellbrook Hotel holds regular events for locals and tourists.

=== Camping ===
Camping or leasing cottages in Bellbrook is a popular attraction particularly with 4WD holidaymakers due to its untouched hinterland and popular fishing grounds.

=== Fishing ===
Bellbrook and its surrounds are renowned for quality bass fishing. One of Australia's first bass lures was appropriately called the 'Bellbrook Wobbler'. A popular lodge up-river from the town of Bellbrook is called Bass Lodge and offers fishing stays.

=== Kayaking ===
Many visitors bring kayaks or canoes to enjoy the Macleay river, paddling upstream, to then be carried back downstream while fishing or taking in the hinterland.

=== Tennis ===
With revitalised tennis courts overlooking aged gum trees on the river side of the village, the courts are a unique experience amidst nature. Bookings are made via the local Bellbrook Hotel.

=== Trails ===
There are walking and riding trails around Bellbrook and its reserves.

=== Up-River Drumming Sessions ===
Held each month in the School of Arts Hall, the Up-River Drumming sessions are a very popular gathering place for the Bellbrook community and visitors.

== Notable people ==
'Homewood', Bellbrook is the childhood home of country music star Slim Dusty. It is located at Nulla Nulla Creek.

Paddy O'Sullivan (dec. 1993) was a past manager of historic local farm Pee Dee Station, receiving an OAM for his services to the beef industry. Pee Dee Station was established in 1873 and is now managed by the fourth generation of O'Sullivan's.

== Schools ==
=== Bellbrook Public School ===
Education in the district began in 1883 at Midnight Creek, located approximately three kilometres east of Bellbrook, opening initially as a provisional school. The school then moved to half-time with Pee Dee from 1887 to 1890, closed from 1890 to 1910, then re-opened half-time with Nulla Nulla from 1910 to 1911, and has been continually open since then.

The first school on site was built in 1911. In 1930, the current Bellbrook School was built. Carcolla School was moved to Bellbrook school grounds in 1970 and is now the infants department.

A former boarding school, the Mirriwinni Gardens Aboriginal Academy, also operated at Bellbrook for more than thirty years. It educated more than 1,500 children, but was forced to close in 2009 after running into financial difficulties. It is now the grounds for Misty Mountain Health Retreat.

As at 2017, Bellbrook Public School had an enrolment of 32 students.

== Heritage listings ==
Bellbrook has a number of heritage-listed sites, including:

- 1279 Nulla Nulla Creek Road: Homewood
