= Kunderang Brook =

Coordinates: 31°00′S 152°13′E

Location
- Country: Australia
- State: New South Wales
- Region: New England Tablelands (IBRA), Northern Tablelands, Mid North Coast
- Local government area: Walcha

Physical characteristics
- Source: Great Dividing Range
  - location: below Brushy Mountain
  - elevation: 1,020 m (3,350 ft)
- Mouth: confluence with the Macleay River
  - location: near Lower Creek
  - elevation: 164 m (538 ft)
- Length: 57 km (35 mi)

Basin features
- River system: Macleay River catchment
- Tributaries
  - right: Fitzroy Creek
- National park: Oxley Wild Rivers NP

The Kunderang Brook, a perennial stream that is part of the Macleay River catchment, is located in the Northern Tablelands and Mid North Coast regions of New South Wales, Australia.

== Course and features ==
Kunderang Brook rises about 7.2 kilometres (4.5 mi) west of Brushy Mountain, within the Great Dividing Range, southwest of the Carrai National Park. The river flows generally north northwest, joined by a minor tributary before reaching its confluence with the Macleay River below the Carrai Tableland, about 19 kilometres (12 mi) southwest of the locality of Lower Creek. Much of the river flows through remote country within the Oxley Wild Rivers National Park and The Castles Nature Reserve. The river descends 857 metres (2,812 ft) over its 57 kilometres (35 mi) course.

== See also ==
- Rivers of New South Wales
- List of rivers of New South Wales (A–K)
- List of rivers of Australia
