= Dhanggati language =

Extinct Australian Aboriginal language

Dhanggati
- Macleay Valley
- Region: New South Wales, Australia
- Ethnicity: Dhanggati = Djangadi, ?Ngaku
- Native speakers: (5 cited 1981)
- Revival: 137 (2021 census)
- Language family: Pama–Nyungan: Yuin–Kuric; Kuric; Dhanggati
- Dialects: Dhanggati; ? Ngaagu; ? Burrgati

Language codes
- ISO 639-3: dyn
- Glottolog: dyan1250
- AIATSIS: E6
- ELP: Dhanggati

Dhanggati (Dunghutti, Thangatti), previously known as Dyangadi (Djangadi), is the Australian Aboriginal language once spoken by the Djangadi of the Macleay Valley and surrounding high country of the Great Dividing Range in New South Wales. There is an ongoing program of language-revival. Ngaagu (Ngaku) and Burgadi (Burrgati) were probably dialects. The three together have been called the Macleay Valley language.

Shared designated Ceremonial between surrounding tribes ie: Anaiwan, Gumbagerri and including tribes from further west from Armidale to the north at Tenterfield, New South Wales and southern tribes such as the tribes around Nowendoc, S.E New South Wales.

Anaiwan Country did tradeoffs with the surrounding tribes for the use of a ceremonial site which the University of New England is now located at Booloominbah house (erected 1888) when the then colonial settlement Armidale was becoming an important trade route and penal colony housing a jail at the earliest time of Colonialism and a route further West to the 'Western Plains'. It was also a deterrent to large groups of natives from gathering, so their places of the deepest and spiritual importance was simply replaced by Aboriginal places of "checks and balances" to the White Imperialism ways of "keeping things in check".

The site of this important ceremonial place was the "Original Square Dance" ceremony performed by tribal priests. Elders from the past refer to the 'New England' Tablelands as "being too cold". The groups surrounding the areas of Armidale merged with coastal tribes and shared in one of many ceremonies. The Dhunghutti Tribal name for the Creator Spirit was Woorparow Yo Wa (pronounced woo-PA-ra yo-wa) also known as Bhiamie. The ceremonial meaning and purpose of the "Original Square Dance" is not lost to history. The ceremony is set in "high up" Country close to the sky.

== History ==
Dhanggati continued to be spoken through the 1960s. Its survival so far into the 20th century can be traced back to the working camps of men from Bellbrook and Lower Creek who escaped social control whilst clearing land for property owners in the western end of the valley. Dhanggati was the language of the camps and working life, away from the pressure to switch to English in the missions and towns.

In 1925 at Kempsey Showground, James Linwood addressed in Dhanggati a meeting of the Australian Aboriginal Progressive Association, to protest the actions of the Aborigines Protection Board.

== Attestation ==
Compared with many NSW languages, Dhanggati has a rich collection of historical sources, from written records in the late 19 th and early 20th centuries to recordings of those last speakers in the 1960s and 1970s. These records form the basis for language revival, because we can extract the grammatical information about sounds, words, word building and sentence building that they contain.

Dhanggati placenames in the Macleay those currently in use e.g. Yarrahappinni Mountain (a corruption of yarra yabani 'koala rolling')

== Classification ==
On linguistic criteria alone, it seems that Dhanggati is more closely related to Anaiwan (Nganyawana) and Yugambal on the Tablelands than any other language. There were at least two dialects, Dhanggati and Buurrgati, the latter is associated with the region around Macksville.

== Social situation ==
Aboriginal people were multi-lingual, speaking the languages of their neighbours as well as their own. There are significant social relationships amongst Dhanggati, Gumbaynggirr and Biripi peoples, including a shared set of marriage sections, which is also a feature of Anaiwan cultural life.

== Revival program ==
Dhanggati is taught in two schools on the NSW Mid North Coast. The language program is currently part of the curriculum in Dalaigur Pre School and Green Hill Public, both in Kempsey. The program started about 2000 and now draws on newly made educational resources and the Dhanggati Language Dictionary.

The program sees elders working with school staff and the education department to enable local kids to connect with country and strengthen their identity & Culture.

== Phonology ==
=== Consonants ===
	Labial	Alveolar	Dental/Palatal	Velar
Plosive	b	d	d̪ ~ ɟ	ɡ
Nasal	m	n	n̪ ~ ɲ	ŋ
Trill		r		
Lateral		l		
Approximant	w	ɹ	j	

- There exists variation between dental sounds /d̪, n̪/ and palatal sounds /ɟ, ɲ/.
- Voiced stop sounds /b, d, d̪ ~ ɟ, ɡ/ may also be interchangeable with voiceless stop sounds [p, t, t̪ ~ c, k] within syllables.

Dhanggati has an unusual "fricitivised rhotic" allophone of the trill or tap when it occurs between vowels, as in mirri and yarri.

=== Vowels ===
	Front	Central	Back
Close	i, iː		u, uː
Open		a, aː	

== Grammar ==
Dhanggati has a complex word building strategies including inflectional and derivational suffixes on nouns, adjectives, demonstratives and pronouns. The pronouns include singular, dual and plural number and several cases. There are at least two classes of verbs based on transitivity, with complex word building patterns to express tense, aspect, mood, and to derive other verbs and nominal forms.

== See also ==
- Dyangadi languages
