= Anēwan =

Australian Aborigine tribe

The Anēwan, also written Anaiwan and Anaywan, are an Aboriginal Australian people whose traditional territory spans the Northern Tablelands in New South Wales.

== Language ==
The Anēwan language, also known as Nganyaywana, has been classified by Robert M. W. Dixon as belonging to the Djan-gadi/Nganjaywana subgroup of Central New South Wales, and was one of three varieties of the group, the other dialects being Himberrong and Inuwon. For a long time Anēwan was regarded, like Mbabaram, as a linguistic isolate, ostensibly failing to fit into the known Australian patterns of language, since the material in word-lists taken down of its vocabulary appeared to lack cognates in contiguous languages such as Gamilaraay. The status of its seeming irregularity was solved in 1976 by Terry Crowley who showed that the differences were caused by initial consonant loss which, once accounted for, yielded up over 100 cognate terms between Anēwan and other languages and dialects of the region. One of the peculiarities generated by this phenomenon of initial loss was that many homophones were created between originally distinct words, so that in Anēwan the word for goanna and bull ant became identical (janda).

== Country ==
According to Norman Tindale, the Anēwan's traditional lands measured some 3,200 square miles (8,300 km^{2}), spreading over the New England tableland from Moree, Guyra and Ben Lomond south to Uralla, Walcha, and the Moonbi Range. Northwest their borders ran to Tingha, and encompassed also Bendemeer and Armidale. Neighbouring tribes were the Baanbay (Gumbaynggir) to their east; (Note: Hoddinott showed that the Baanbay language described as a spoken by a distinct group was simply a minor variant of Gumbaynggirr (Hoddinott 1967, pp. 56–60)) the Djangadi to the south-east, the Yugambal (Jukambal) and Ngarabal to their north, and the Gamilaraay to the west.

== Social structure ==
The Anēwan consisted of several clans, one of which was the Himberrong horde. Their section names were:

- Irong feminine Arkan
- Arpong feminine Iran
- Iyong feminine Patjang
- Imbong feminine Irakena

The Irong intermarried with the Iyong, and the Arpong with the Imbong.

== History ==
By the time R. H. Mathews began to record elements of the Anēwan language in 1903, remnants of the original tribe had been widely dispersed over New England. Those who remained in Armidale lived on a site on the town fringes known as "The Dump", in humpies built close to the rubbish tip, which were devoid of the basic amenities of water, sewerage and electricity, and jerry-rigged by using hessian bags, corrugated sheet iron and cardboard boxes. In 1960, four children died and 11 were hospitalised from infections picked up in conditions that were called "appalling". The government then allocated funds to clean up the area and built cottages in fibro cement for its residents. Eventually, these were replaced by brick units in a settlement which the local Aboriginal community named Narwan.

== Some words ==
- dunya (penis)
- gyaya (food)
- ilgaiwa (summer)
- jarrwanba (winter)
- mbunya (mbanyja) (kangaroo)

== Notable people ==
- Kyah Simon, international soccer player
- May Yarrowick (1876-1949) midwife, and first known Aboriginal person to register as a nurse
- Dean Widders, former NRL player

== Sources ==
- "AIATSIS map of Indigenous Australia". AIATSIS. 14 May 2024.
- Crowley, Terry (1976). "Phonological change in New England". In Dixon, R. M. W. (ed.). Grammatical categories in Australian languages. Australian Institute of Aboriginal Studies. pp. 19–50. ISBN 978-0-855-75055-8.
- Dixon, R. M. W. (1980). The Languages of Australia. Cambridge University Press. ISBN 978-0-521-29450-8.
- Dixon, R. M. W. (2002). Australian Languages: Their Nature and Development. Vol. 1. Cambridge University Press. ISBN 978-0-521-47378-1.
- Henderson, John (1851). Excursions and adventures inNew South Wales. W. Shoberl.
- Hoddinott, W. G. (September 1967). "The BA:NBAI Language of Northern New South Wales". Oceania. 38 (1): 56–60. doi:10.1002/j.1834-4461.1967.tb00935.x. JSTOR 40329645.
- Lynch, John (June 2005). "In Memoriam, Terry Crowley 1953-2005". Oceanic Linguistics. 44 (1): 223–241. doi:10.1353/ol.2005.0022. JSTOR 3623236. S2CID 143865935.
- Mathews, R. H. (1903). "Languages of the New England Aborigines, NSW". Proceedings of the American Philosophical Society. 42: 249–263.
- McDonald, Barry (1996). "Evidence of four New England corroboree songs indicating Aboriginal responses to European invasion". Aboriginal History. 20: 176–194. JSTOR 24046134.
- Radcliffe-Brown, A. R. (July 1930). "The Social Organization of Australian Tribes. Part II". Oceania. 1 (2): 206–246. doi:10.1002/j.1834-4461.1930.tb01645.x. JSTOR 40327321.
- Reid, Nicholas (2009) [First published 2002]. "Creating Aboriginal Placenames: Applied Philology in Armidale City" (PDF). In Hercus, Luise; Hodges, Flavia; Simpson, Jane (eds.). The Land is a Map: Placenames of Indigenous Origin in Australia. Australian National University. pp. 241–254. ISBN 978-1-921-53657-1.
- Tindale, Norman Barnett (1974). "Anaiwan (NSW)". Aboriginal Tribes of Australia: Their Terrain, Environmental Controls, Distribution, Limits, and Proper Names. Australian National University Press. ISBN 978-0-708-10741-6.
- Woolmington, Jo (1991). "The "Assimilation" years in a country town". Aboriginal History. 15 (1/2): 25–37. JSTOR 24046400.
