= Language Magazine =

- Cover from Nov 2006
- Frequency: Monthly
- Circulation: 150,000
- First issue: 1997; 28 years ago

First published in 1997, Language Magazine (formerly American Language Review) is the popular periodical of language, education and communication. In 2001, Language Magazine increased its publication schedule from 6 to 12 issues a year to answer the demand of readers (including department heads, supervisors, government officials and other decision-makers) to be kept up to date with developments in the fast paced world of language and literacy education.

== Background ==
It has often published the works of Stephen Krashen, Aned Y. Muñiz Gracia and Eugene E. García, among others expert in the fields of linguistics and language instruction. A great deal of its 150,000 monthly circulation are Teachers of Foreign Languages (TOFL), Teachers of English as Foreign Language (TOEFL), and teachers of English as a Second Language (ESL), as well as educational administrators and university language departments. The California Language Teachers Association also uses it in lieu of a monthly publication. Richard Lederer is also a monthly contributor.

Language Magazine is an influential forum of information for language-related professions and businesses. It was the only publication chosen by the U.S. Census Bureau to partner in its “Census in the Schools” program in 2000. In 2003, Language Magazine received the prestigious Media & Communications Award from the California Association for Bilingual Education (CABE).

The look of the magazine has been creatively directed by Los Angeles–based magazine designer Leanna Robinson since 2016.
