= Anewan language =

Extinct Australian Aboriginal language

Anaiwan
- Anewan; New England
- Native to: Australia
- Region: Armidale, New South Wales
- Ethnicity: Anēwan, Himberrong
- Extinct: (date missing)
- Revival: 2017
- Language family: Pama–Nyungan: Anaiwan; Anaiwan
- Dialects: Nganyaywana (South Anaiwan); Inuwon–Himberrong; ? Enneewin (North Anaiwan)

Language codes
- ISO 639-3: nyx
- Glottolog: ngan1296
- AIATSIS: D24 Southern Anaiwan, D64 Northern Anaiwan
- ELP: Nganyaywana
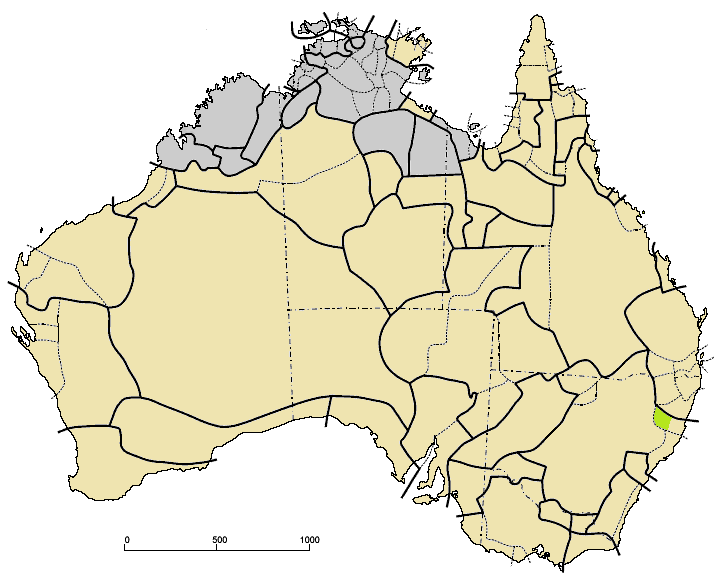
- Anaiwan (green) among other Pama–Nyungan languages (tan)

Anaiwan (Anēwan) is an Australian Aboriginal language of New South Wales. Since 2017, there has been a revival program underway to bring the language back.

== Classification ==
Once included in the Kuric languages, Bowern (2011) classifies Nganyaywana as a separate Anēwan (Anaiwan) branch of the Pama–Nyungan languages.

== Dialects ==
Besides Nganyaywana, Anewan may include Enneewin, with which shares about 65% of its vocabulary. Crowley (1976) counts these as distinct languages, whereas Wafer and Lissarrague (2008) consider them to be dialects.

== Phonology ==
=== Consonants ===
	Peripheral		Laminal	Apical	
	Labial	Velar	Palatal	Alveolar	Retroflex
Plosive	b	ɡ	ɟ	d	
Nasal	m	ŋ	ɲ	n	
Lateral			ʎ	l	
Trill				r	
Approximant	w		j		ɻ

=== Vowels ===
- Vowels are heard as /i, a, u/. Each may also have allophones as [e], [ɛ, ɔ], and [o].

== See also ==
- Dyangadi languages
