= Macleay River =

Macleay River Muddy River
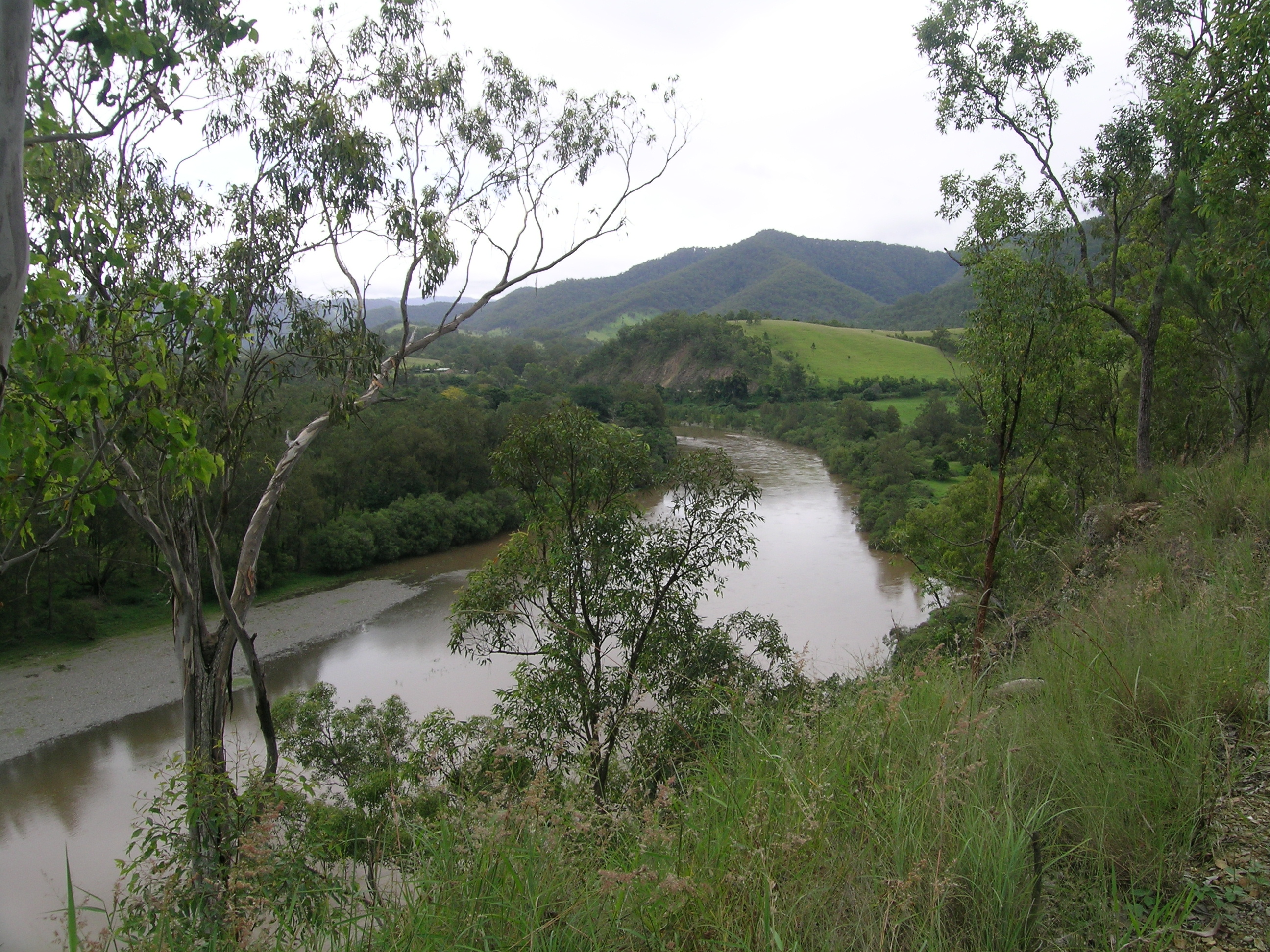
- Macleay River, viewed at Lower Creek

- Location of the river mouth in New South Wales
- Etymology: Alexander Macleay

Location
- Country: Australia
- State: New South Wales
- IBRA: New England Tablelands, New South Wales North Coast
- District: Northern Tablelands, Mid North Coast
- Local government area: Armidale, Bellingen, Kempsey

Physical characteristics
- Source: Great Dividing Range
  - location: Blue Nobby Mountain, near Uralla
  - elevation: 455 m (1,493 ft)
- 2nd source: Gara River
- Source confluence: Salisbury Waters and Bakers Creek
- Mouth: Tasman Sea
  - location: near South West Rocks
  - coordinates: 30°52′S 153°01′E
  - elevation: 0 m (0 ft)
- Length: 298 km (185 mi)
- Basin size: 11,287 km^{2} (4,358 sq mi)
- Discharge
  - location: Near mouth
  - average: 82.5 m^{3}/s (2,600 GL/a)

Basin features
- Tributaries
  - left: Chandler River, Top Creek, Dyke River, Sunday Creek (New South Wales), Georges Creek, Five Day Creek, Lagoon Creek, Nulla Nulla Creek, Hickeys Creek, Mungay Creek, Christmas Creek, Clybucca Creek
  - right: Blue Mountain Creek, Apsley River, Kunderang Brook, Carrolls Creek, Felters Creek, Stockyard Creek, Mackenzies Creek, Warbro Brook, Parrabel Creek, Cadiangullong Creek, Dungay Creek, Belmore River, Kinchela Creek
- National parks: Cunnawarra NP, Oxley Wild Rivers NP

The Macleay River is a river that spans the Northern Tablelands and Mid North Coast districts of New South Wales, Australia.

== Course and features ==
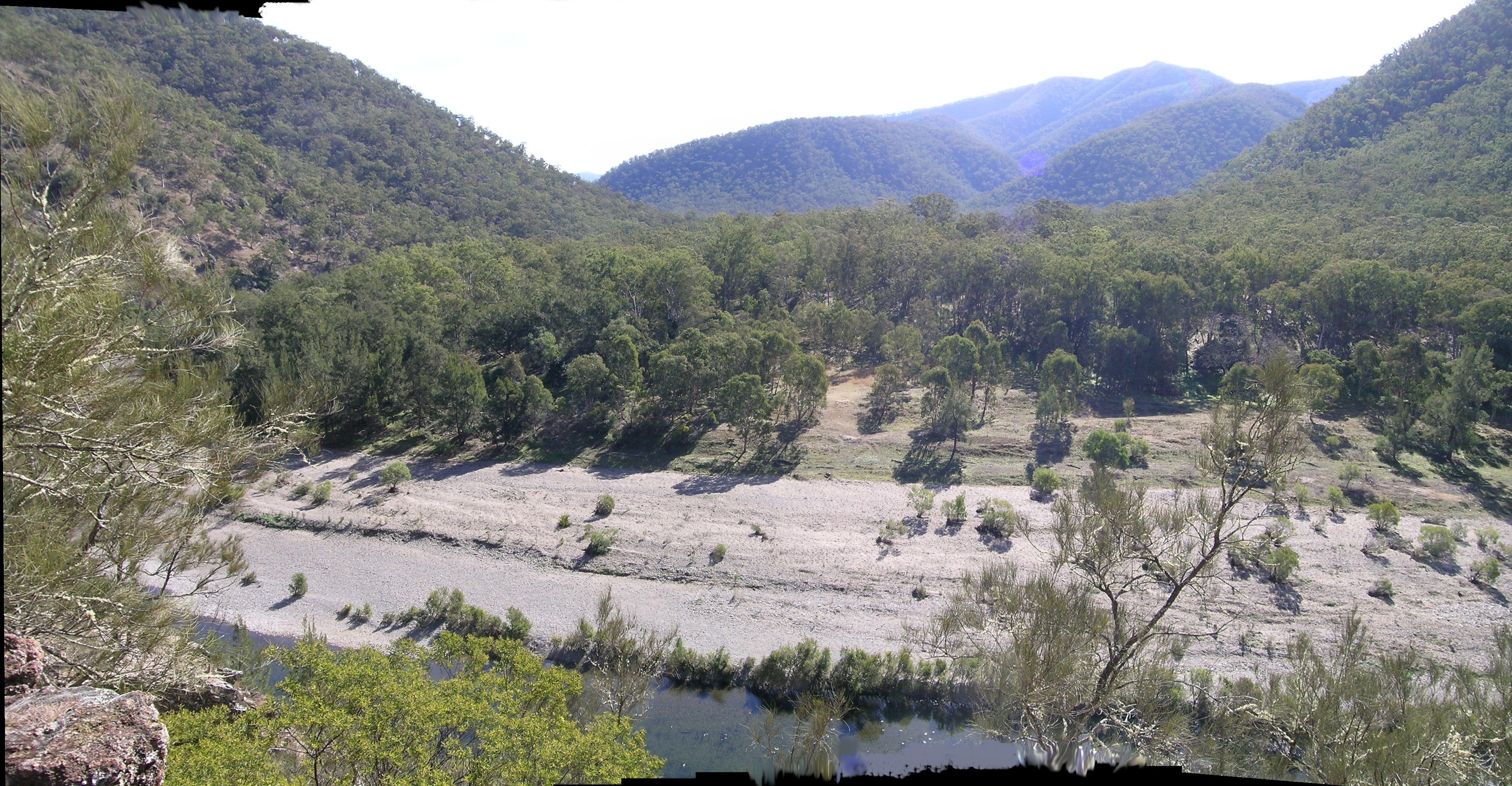
Macleay River at Oven Camp, Oxley Wild Rivers National Park.

Formed by the confluence of the Gara River, Salisbury Waters and Bakers Creek, the Macleay River rises below Blue Nobby Mountain, east of Uralla within the Great Dividing Range. The river flows in a meandering course generally east by south, joined by twenty-six tributaries including the Apsley, Chandler, and Dyke rivers and passing through a number of spectacular gorges and waterfalls in Cunnawarra National Park and Oxley Wild Rivers National Park, through heritage-listed mountain village Bellbrook amidst others, before reaching its mouth at the Tasman Sea, near South West Rocks. The river descends 460 metres (1,510 ft) over its 298 kilometres (185 mi) course.

The river flows through the town of Kempsey. At Frederickton the river is traversed by the Pacific Highway via the Macleay River Bridge (Dhanggati language: Yapang gurraarrbang gayandugayigu). At the time of its official opening in 2013, the bridge was the longest road bridge in Australia. The river is also traversed by the North Coast railway line.

The Macleay River is liable to flooding in the Kempsey area, on occasions causing great damage. During times of peak flooding, the Macleay River can hold over 200,000 gigalitres (44,000,000 million imperial gallons; 53,000,000 million US gallons) of water.

== History ==
The Dunghutti, an Aboriginal Australian people, are the traditional custodians of the land surrounding the Macleay River catchment and the Apsley River catchment, whose descendants are now concentrated in the lower Macleay River. Stone artefacts and evidence of Aboriginal stone tool-making have been found around the Macleay and Apsley rivers.

John Oxley failed to realise the potential of this river in 1820 as he did not navigate far enough up-river to see the magnificent stands of timber and the fertile land. The river was vaguely referred to as the New River from descriptions given by Aborigines. In 1826 Captain Wright travelled overland from Port Macquarie and explored to the head of navigation at Belgrave Falls, a series of rapids to the west of the present town of Kempsey. It was then called Wrights River. Major Archibald Clunes Innes, Commandant of Port Macquarie Penal Settlement, sent the first government gang of Australian red cedar (Toona ciliata) cutters to work there in 1827.

More cedar camps were established on the Macleay during the 1830s and the area was also a haven for escaped convicts. By 1841, about 200 cutters were working on the river area, where violence and theft of logs was not uncommon. Demand and prices dropped in 1842 and cutting along the Macleay diminished although it continued in the upper tributaries. When Europeans arrived in the area around the 1820s the river mouth was just south of Grassy Head, and almost a mile wide with a sand spit in the middle. The small town of Stuarts Point was established on the river just inside to serve arriving ships.

The coastal strip extending from South West Rocks to Grassy Head is a wide delta with various channels connected to the river. Around 1885 English marine engineer John Coode advised on improvements to various rivers and ports in Australia, including the Macleay. The Department of Public Works prepared four plans for improvements to the mouth, Coode favoured improving the existing entrance. In 1893 a flood enlarged an opening near South West Rocks and the department elected to improve that, called the New Entrance, though Coode had thought it not enough to drain all the waters of the district. Work on the new entrance started in April 1896, improving the channel and adding training walls. A new pilot station was built in 1902, establishing the town of South West Rocks. Work was completed in 1906. Today the old mouth has silted up, leaving Stuarts Point on a dead-end reach.

Variously known as Wright River, Trail River, New and McLeay rivers, it was named the Macleay River in honour of Innes's father-in-law, Alexander Macleay, Scottish-born scientist and colonial secretary of New South Wales.

== See also ==
- Rivers of New South Wales
- List of rivers of Australia
- Bellbrook, New South Wales
