= Oxley Wild Rivers National Park =

National park in New South Wales, Australia

- IUCN category Ib (wilderness area)
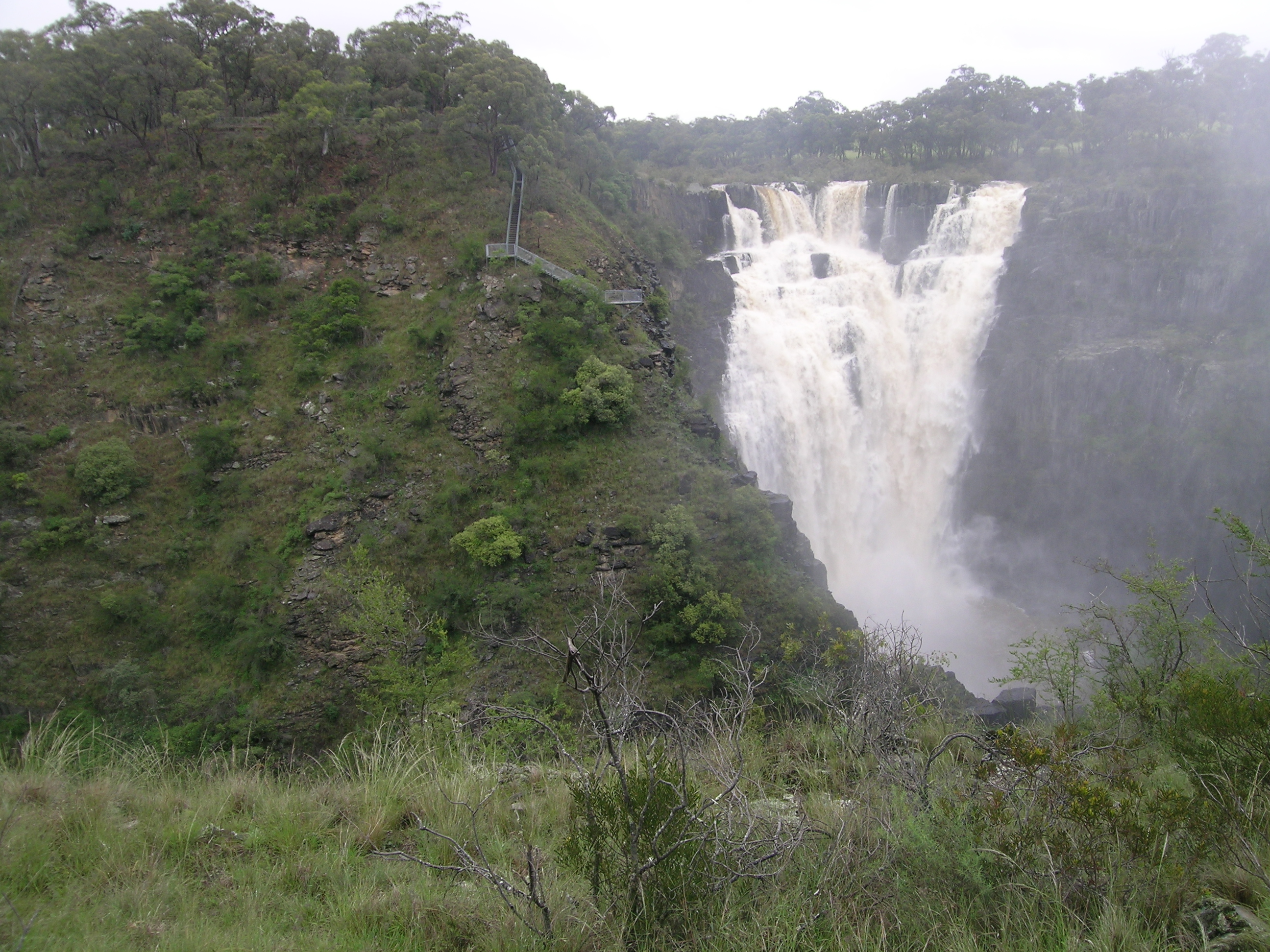
- Apsley Falls, located within the national park

- Location within New South Wales
- Location: New South Wales
- Nearest city: Yarrowitch
- Coordinates: 30°59′47″S 152°00′36″E
- Area: 1,452.33 km^{2} (560.75 sq mi)
- Established: 26 September 1986
- Governing body: NSW National Parks & Wildlife Service
- Website: Official website

The Oxley Wild Rivers National Park is a protected national park in the Northern Tablelands region of New South Wales, Australia in the Port Macquarie-Hastings City Council and Walcha Shire councils. The 145,223-hectare (358,850-acre) park is situated 445 kilometres (277 mi) north of Sydney and is named in memory of the Australian explorer John Oxley, who passed through the area in 1818 and is one of the largest national parks in New South Wales.

The park is part of the Hastings-Macleay Group World Heritage Site Gondwana Rainforests of Australia inscribed in 1986 and added to the Australian National Heritage List in 2007.

The Oxley Wild Rivers National Park (OWRNP) was World Heritage listed in recognition of the extensive dry rainforest that occurs within the park, and the associated rich biodiversity that includes several rare or threatened plants and animals. There are at least fourteen waterfalls in the park.

== History ==
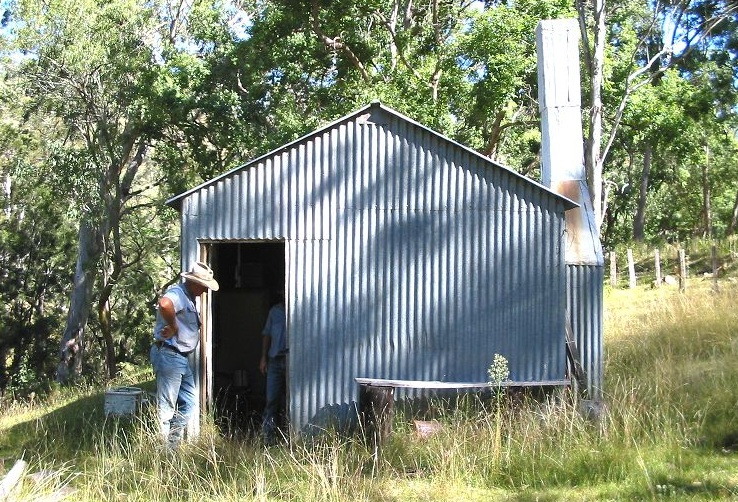
Green Gully Hut

For thousands of years, the Northern Tablelands and these valleys were the tribal lands of the Dangaddi aboriginal people, whose descendants are now concentrated in the lower Macleay River. Some marked trees have been found and a limestone cave shelter has been excavated near Kunderang Brook.

In 1818 explorer John Oxley and his party tried to descend the Apsley valley, but steep gorges blocked the way until they proceeded around the head of the Apsley Falls. After Oxley passed through the cedar-getters were the first white people to penetrate these remote gorges and valleys in search of Australian red cedar (Toona ciliata) which was floated down-river to Kempsey.

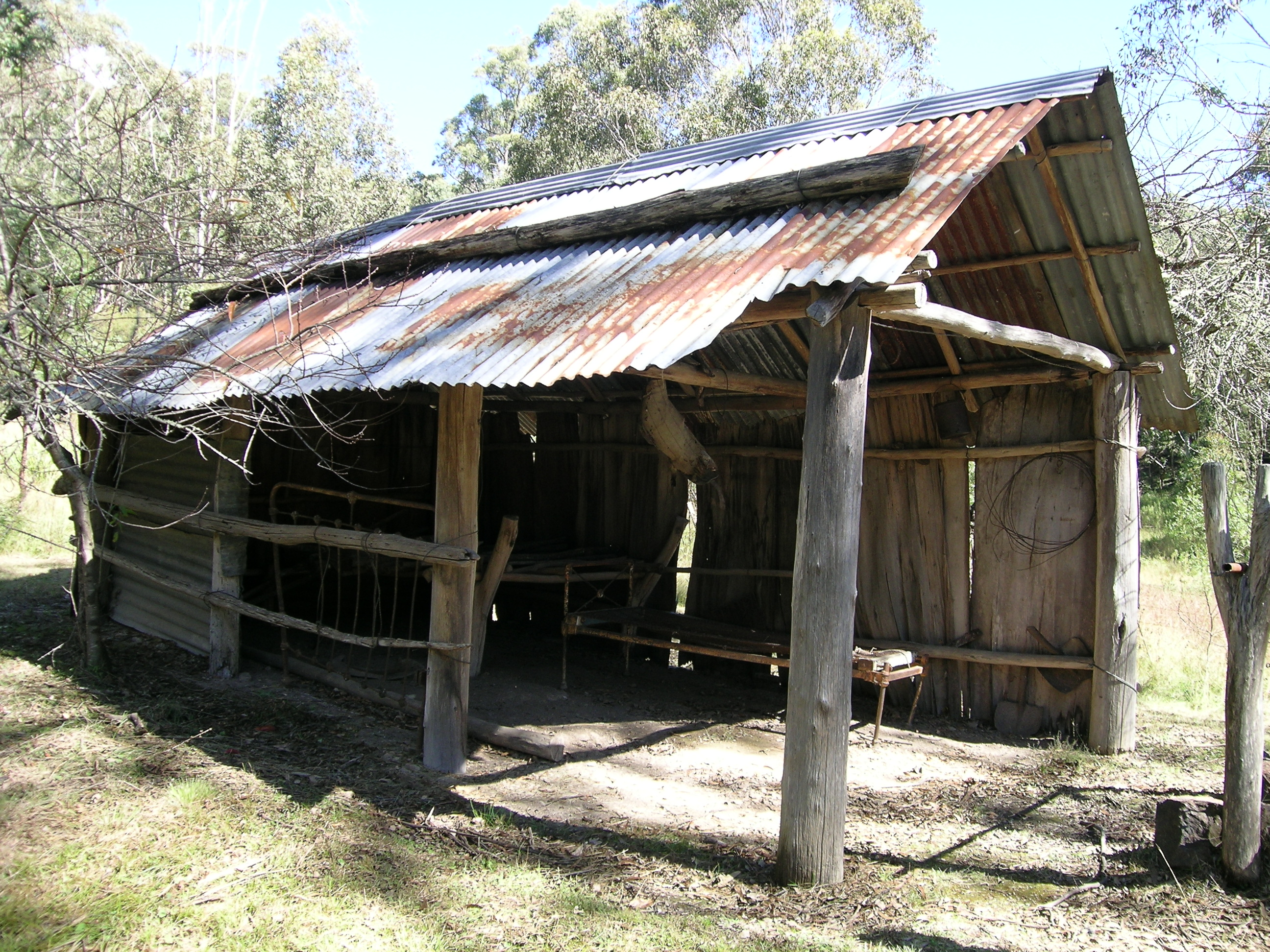
Restored early 20th century Bark Hut constructed by the Brennan family for mustering trips

There have been cattle grazing through the Macleay River Gorges, called 'The Falls', since the 1840s, with mustering points (yards and huts) occurring at Top Creek, (Sunderlands) Middle Yards, Kunderang, Left Hand, Oven Camp, Youdales Hut, Green Gully, Yarrowitch River and Front Tableland. The recently restored Middle Yards Hut was once part of the 32,000-hectare (79,000-acre) East Kunderang cattle station on the Macleay River.

In the late 19th century several gold and antimony mines were established around the rim of the gorges, at places such as Halls Peak and Hillgrove, as well as two ambitious hydro-electric schemes to power them, the remains of which can be seen today along the Styx River and at Gara Gorge.

In 1976 the Apsley Macleay Gorges were identified as being of true wilderness quality. At that stage the public protection offered to the area was limited to two small reserves in the south, and a few local council run recreation areas at sites such as Wollomombi Falls, Dangars and Apsley Falls. With future land-use undecided, the NSW Electricity Commission began surveying the Apsley Valley for a hydro-electric scheme in the late 1970s. The Apsley Gorge National Park of 6,718 hectares (16,600 acres) was gazetted followed by the 3,456-hectare (8,540-acre) Yarrowitch Gorge National Park soon after.

During late 1981 the track to the Apsley River at Riverside was improved and Elcom installed a river gauging station. The project was shelved following a land use study recommending a national park be established. In 1986 the park was gazetted to foster nature conservation, cultural heritage and tourism on the Northern Tablelands. In 1989 East Kunderang Station of 30,400 hectares (75,000 acres) passed to the National Parks and Wildlife Service (NPWS) and was proclaimed the Oxley Wild Rivers National Park.

In 1994 Oxley Wild Rivers National Park was inscribed on the Register of World Heritage sites, as part of the Central Eastern Rainforest Reserves of Australia (CERRA); subsequently renamed as the Gondwana Rainforests of Australia. Later 1,850 hectares (4,600 acres) of Winterbourne State Forest, also known at the Big Lease, was added to the wilderness. The remaining 1,560 hectares (3,900 acres) of Winterbourne and 1,075 hectares (2,660 acres) of Enmore State Forests are to be added to the national park. Further inclusions include Green Gully headwaters and 1,439 hectares (3,560 acres) of leasehold land in the lower Chandler River gorge. The Macleay Gorges Wilderness Area was declared in 1996 and extended in 1997 and covers over 50,000 hectares (120,000 acres), mainly in the central part of the park.

In December 2009 a lightning strike started a bushfire in the Youdales Hut area. The hut was unaffected, but 1,500 hectares (3,700 acres) of inaccessible steep country was burnt out before it was brought under control. Another lightning strike started a large bushfire in the Reedy Creek region of the park. This fire has burnt out over 8,000 hectares (20,000 acres) of rough country.

== Geography ==
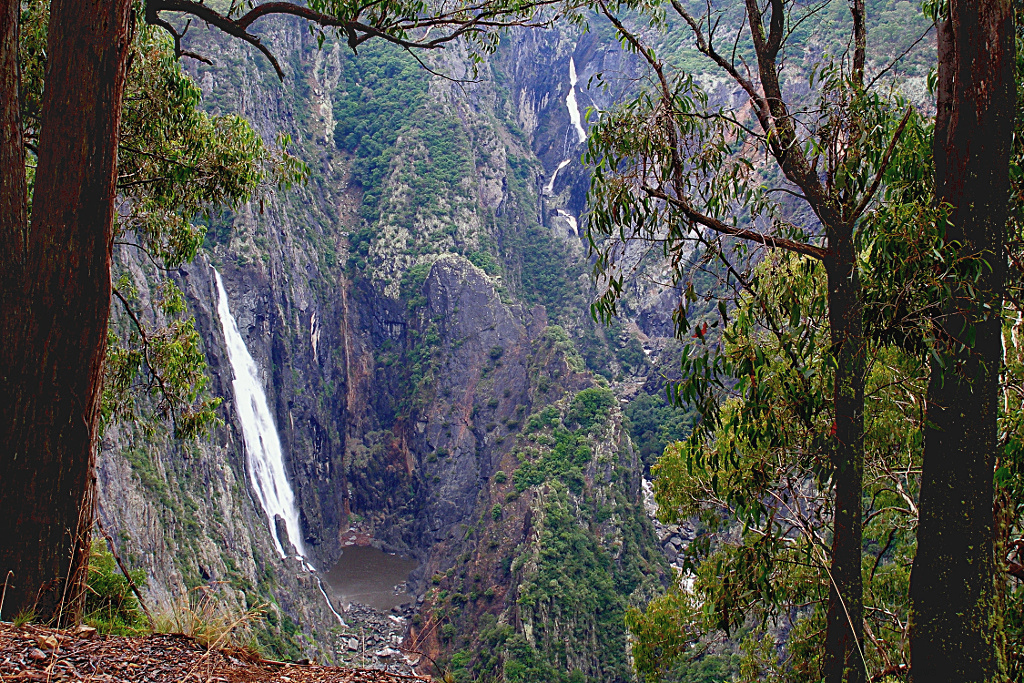
Wollomombi and Chandler Falls

The Oxley Wild Rivers National Park lies along the Great Escarpment between the Northern Tablelands, and the east coast and has dramatic gorges and waterfalls, extensive wilderness and dry rainforest. The main rivers in the national park are the: Apsley River, Macleay River, Wollomombi River, Chandler River, Tia River, Styx River, Gara River, Yarrowitch River, Oaky River and the Kunderang Brook. There are a number of waterfalls situated throughout the park including: Wollomombi Falls, Apsley Falls, Tia Falls and Dangars Falls as well as numerous cascades. The waterfalls in the park are at their best after rains and the main ones are accessible by car.

== Geology ==
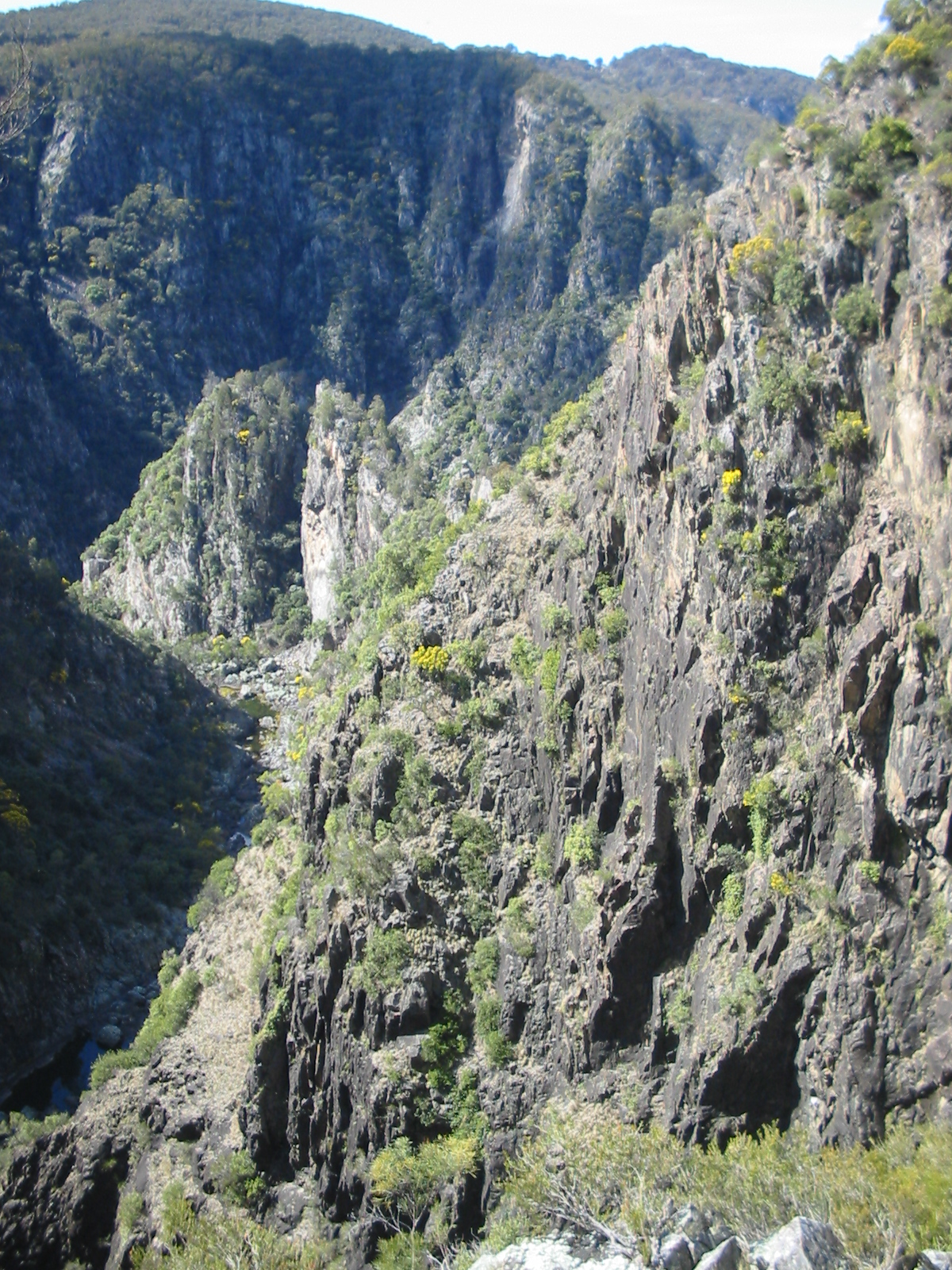
Dangars Gorge, near Armidale

The formation of the area began with muddy sediments under ancient oceans that were changed by heat and pressure into hard rocks, then uplifted by movements of the continental plate and volcanic eruptions. This resulted in the formation of the Great Dividing Range, an undulating plateau that sloped gently to the west and fell away steeply to the east.

Erosion by wind, rain, storms and ice over millions of years carved out the plateaus of the Northern Tablelands, and rivers and streams gradually cut back the eastern edge of the tableland creating deep gorges that eventually formed one continuous escarpment. The jagged scarp is slowly retreating west and this movement can be seen today in the erosion of steep cliffs at places like Wollomombi, Dangars and Apsley Gorges.

== Flora ==
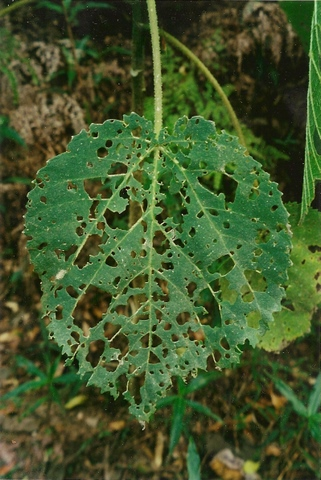
Stinging tree (Dendrocnide excelsa)

The Apsley Macleay Gorges are a converging point for moister eastern coastal and dry western floras, and some 950 native plant species have been identified, of which 36 are rare or threatened.

The rare plants found include: Grevillea obtusiflora, Acacia blakei (subsp. diphylla) (Wollomombi or gorge wattle) and Acacia ingramii which grows at Dangars Gorge. Some Australian red cedar trees may also be seen in the more remote locations. Threatened flora of the area includes the wedge-leaved guinea flower (Hibbertia hermanniifolia), Grevillea beadleana and Hakea fraseri (gorge hakea). Hillgrove spotted gum (Eucalyptus michaeliana) may be seen south of Hillgrove and in the Big Lease, north-east of Walcha. The beautiful Caladenia orchid has been spotted at Long Point.

Dry rainforests in the OWRNP contain at least 187 plant species and they are visible as dense, dark green patches of brush box (Lophostemon confertus), favouring hollows where there is shelter from wind and sun. The adaptable bird's nest fern (Asplenium australasicum) grows in a variety of sites as an epiphyte on large trees, independently growing on the forest floor or attached to rocks. Other plants that could be found in or around dry rainforests include: native rosella (Hibiscus heterophyllus), gorge mock-olive (Notelaea microcarpa), Brachychiton discolor (lacebark), Moreton Bay fig (Ficus macrophylla), native olive (Olea paniculata), red kamala (Mallotus philippensis), scentless rosewood (Synoum glandulosum) and shatterwood (Backhousia sciadophora).

The open forest and woodlands are dominated by various trees. The main species are: Angophora floribunda (rough-barked apple), Eucalyptus retinens (Hillgrove box), Eucalyptus andrewsii (New England blackbutt), Eucalyptus caliginosa (broadleaved New England stringybark), Eucalyptus laevopinea (silvertop stringybark), Eucalyptus melliodora (yellow box) and wild cherry. Eucalyptus tereticornis (forest red gum) identified by the bark on its trunk which sheds to expose white, grey or bluish patches may also be seen, too. Epiphytic orchids may be observed growing in some of these trees, as well.

The hazardous stinging tree (Dendrocnide excelsa) is found in various locations throughout the park. This is a dangerous plant and physical contact with it should be avoided. The stems and leaves are coated with fine hairs which when imbedded in the skin cause severe pain and irritation for prolonged periods. Smilax australis (lawyer vine or wait-a-while) is another plant to be avoided as it has prickly climbing stems that are up to eight metres long and will catch in clothing or the skin.

The understorey is often sparse except for occasional Acacia (wattles), Bursaria spinosa (blackthorn), Xanthorrhoea (grass trees) and The cassinia, geebung (Persoonia spp.), Pomaderris lanigera (woolly pomaderris), Jacksonia scoparia (dogwood) and Prostanthera (mint bush) are the most common species in the area.

Because the conditions are extreme on the cliffs, quite a number of rare and uncommon shrubs are found there. These include: broadleaf hopbush (Dodonaea rhombifolia), Dodonaea serratifolia, Grevillea beadleana, Grevillea obtusiflora, Hakea fraseri (gorge hakea), climbing fig, orchids and Westringia sp. Bertya ingramii (narrow-leaved bertya) is an endangered species of shrub that is found in two locations, growing among rocks or in thin soils close to cliff-edges in dry woodland with she-oaks, wattles and tea-trees.

== Fauna ==
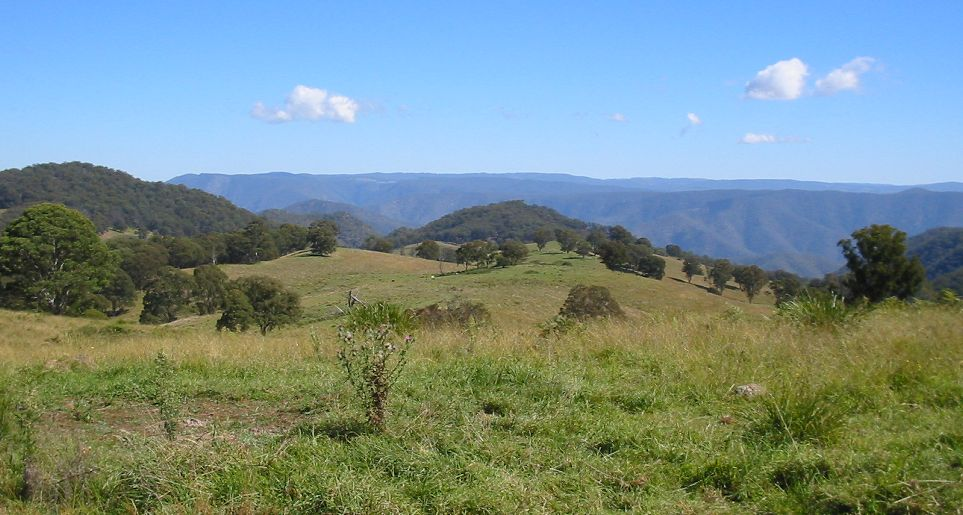
Green Gully area, Yarrowitch, NSW

The park is rich in fauna, with over 350 species recorded, including 55 mammals. Oxley Wild Rivers National Park is a major refuge for the brush-tailed rock-wallaby (Petrogale pencillata), with the largest confirmed population in the Green Gully area of Yarrowitch.

Other species found in the park include bandicoots, bats, koalas, wombats and numerous small ground mammals. Quolls, common brushtail possums, sugar gliders, platypus, echidnas, wedge-tailed eagles, peregrine falcons and dingoes may also be seen.

Over 173 bird species have been recorded in Oxley Wild Rivers National Park.

There have been 38 reptile and 19 amphibian species recorded in Oxley Wild Rivers National Park. Skinks, goannas, tortoises, lizards, snakes, frogs and fish occur in the park, particularly on the river flats. A number of fish species have been recorded. Notable, is the speckled longfin eel (Anguilla reinhardtii), which breeds in the ocean with the juveniles eventually returning to the Apsley–Macleay River system.

Twelve species listed as threatened under the Threatened Species Conservation Act 1995 are found in the wilderness area. There are five mammals (brush-tailed phascogale, brush-tailed rock wallaby, koala, squirrel glider and tiger quoll); four birds (glossy black cockatoo, greater sooty owl, superb fruit-dove and turquoise parrot); one reptile (Morelia spilota variegata (carpet python)); and two frogs (Litoria piperata and Litoria subglandulosa). The national park is also home to the Macleay River tortoise, a recently discovered species, and a rare mammal, the Hastings River mouse (Pseudomys oralis), which is considered to be in imminent danger of extinction.

== Attractions ==
Car access to the park is mainly via the Waterfall Way, east of Armidale and Oxley Highway, east of Walcha. All roads to visitor facilities are suitable for conventional cars except the 4WD tracks to Riverside, Youdales Hut and East Kunderang. A permit and key is required to gain vehicle access to these three sites.

There are several visitor entry points where visitors may enter with a 2WD car and camp overnight:

=== Apsley Falls ===
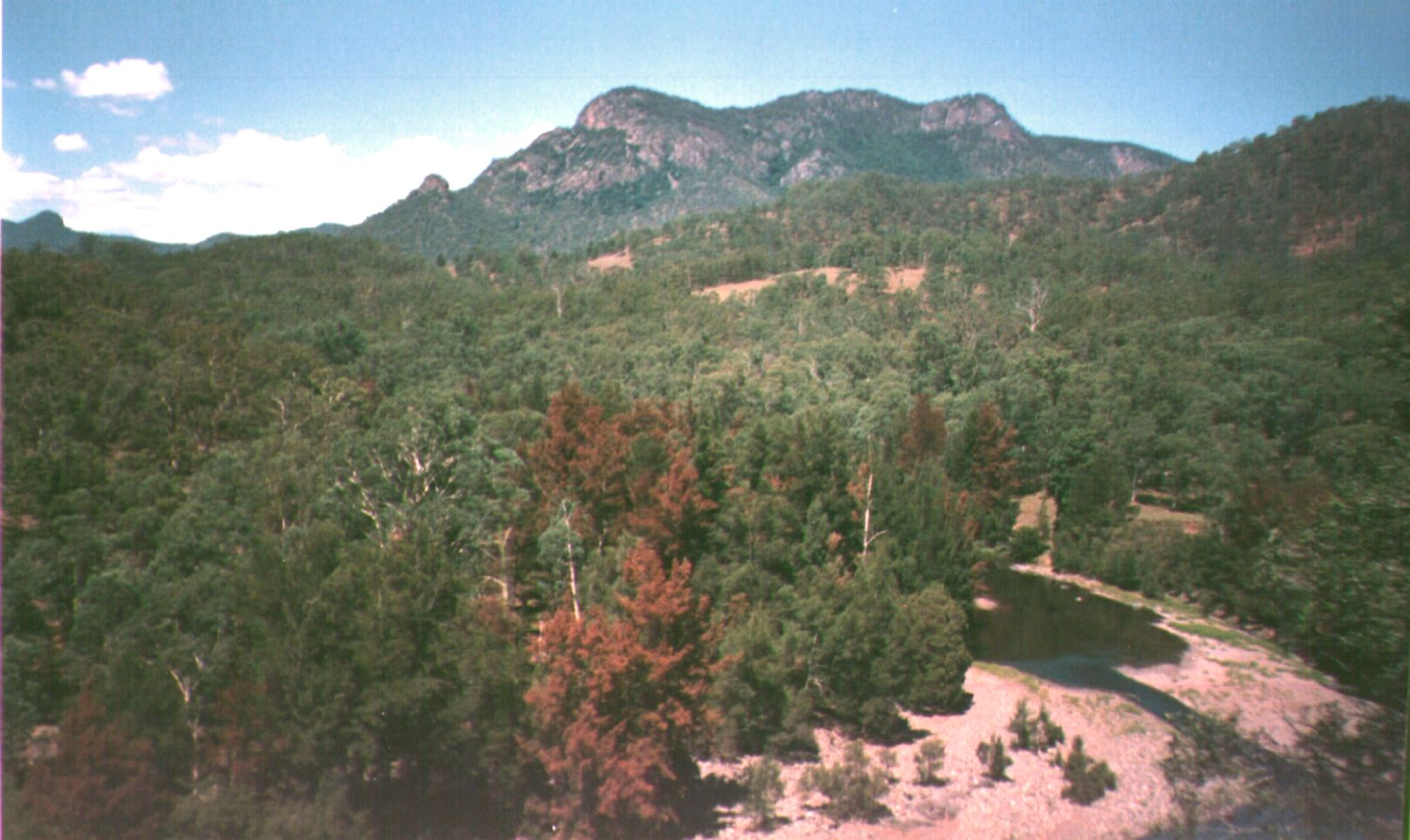
Paradise Rocks and Apsley River from The Terrace, Riverside

The Apsley Falls are located 20 kilometres (12 mi) east of Walcha, 1 kilometre (0.62 mi) off the Oxley Highway. Here the Northern Tablelands plateau drops precipitously into the rugged gorges carved out by the Aspley and upper Macleay Rivers which meander through the park. There is a 52-metre (171 ft) steel stairway leading to an observation deck (with disabled access) where there are great views of the deep gorge and the falls. There are two large falls, with two walking tracks taking in the Gorge Rim Walk and the Oxley Walk, picnic facilities and camping area for overnight stays. On 28 December 2009 the steel footbridge leading to Gorge Rim Walk was washed away.

=== Tia Falls ===
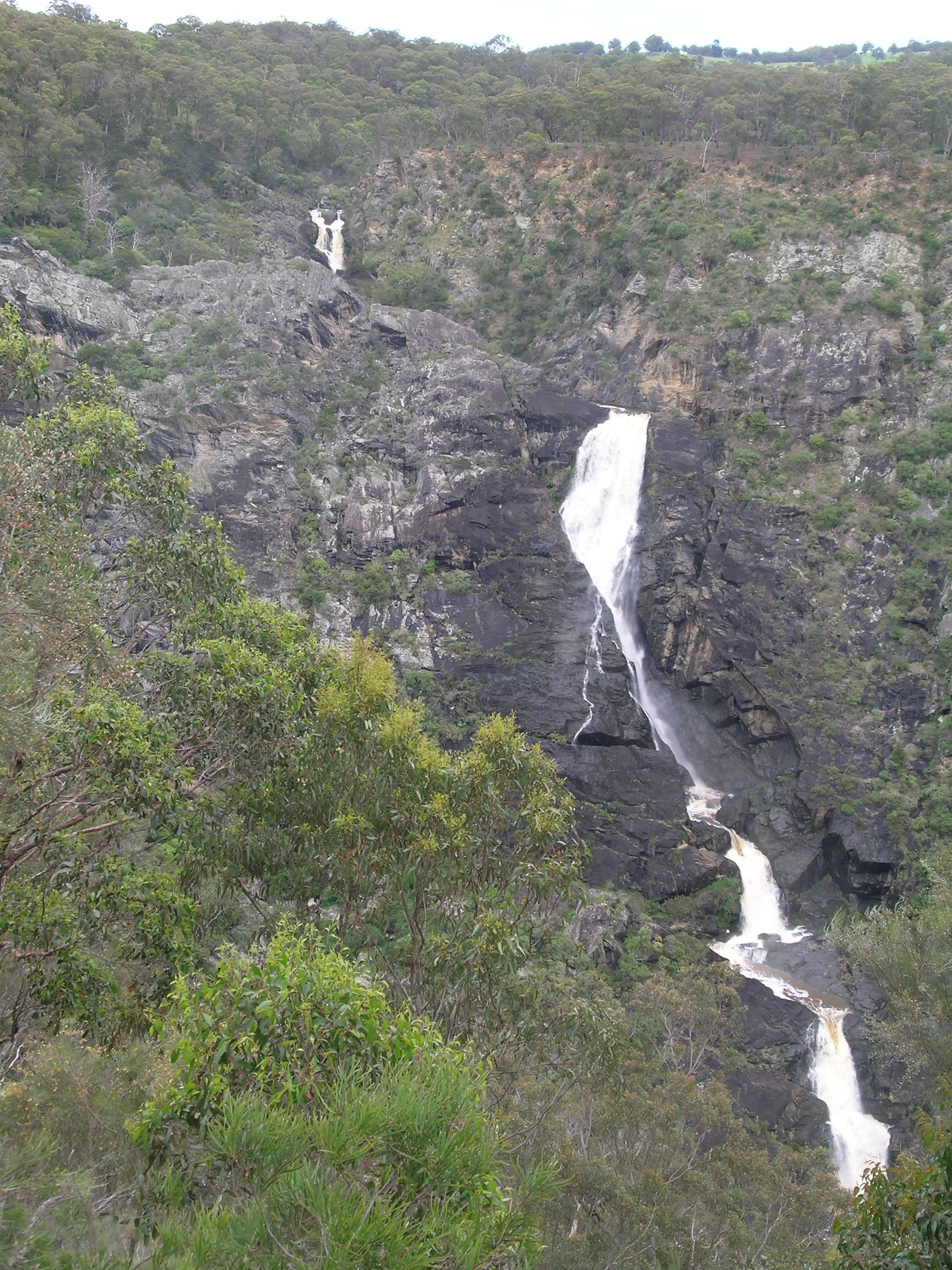
The three drops of the Tia Falls

The Tia Falls, located near Tia, 38 kilometres (24 mi) east of Walcha and 6 kilometres (3.7 mi) off the Oxley Highway. The turnoff for this road is 19 kilometres (12 mi) past the Apsley Falls turnoff (travelling from Walcha). There are waterfalls, with two walking tracks taking in the Falls and Gorge Walk, being 1.5 kilometres (0.93 mi) return;, and the Tiara Walk, being 5 kilometres (3.1 mi) return, picnic facilities and bush camp sites are available for overnight stays.

=== Budds Mare ===
The Budds Mare campground is 44 kilometres (27 mi) east of Walcha via the Moona Plains Road. The route includes 8 kilometres (5.0 mi) of unpaved roads, which is unsuitable for standard 2WD cars, because of washouts. Budds Mare is set in bushland and a short walk takes you to the lookout which has extensive views over Gondwana dry rainforest in the Apsley River Gorge. Across the first gorge is the obvious feature of Paradise Rocks and to the north it is possible to see Round Mountain and Point Lookout. Heading to the right from the shelter shed is a track to a vantage point that overlooks Rusden Creek Gorge. There is a good 8-kilometre (5.0 mi) walk from here down the ridge to the Riverside Visitor Area on the Apsley River, but it is only for well prepared bushwalkers with a sound knowledge of steep country. Return up the same track or follow the road from Riverside up to the top. The return routes are a demanding climb, suitable for fit, experienced bushwalkers only, carrying ample provisions. Alternatively, a 4WD vehicle pick-up may be arranged at Riverside. Facilities here include: Campsites, toilets, picnic tables, wood barbecues, a supply of firewood.

=== Wollomombi Falls ===
An extensive gorge, the Wollomombi Falls gorge houses two waterfalls: Wollomombi Falls itself (one of Australia's highest), and Chandler Falls. Located 40 kilometres (25 mi) east of Armidale along the Waterfall Way, visitors to the gorge are attracted by the rugged scenery, picnic sites, walks along the gorge rim trails, or hikes to the gorge riverbed. Facilities include drinking water, toilets, a shelter shed and fireplace and bush camp sites for overnight stays.

=== Dangars Gorge and Falls ===
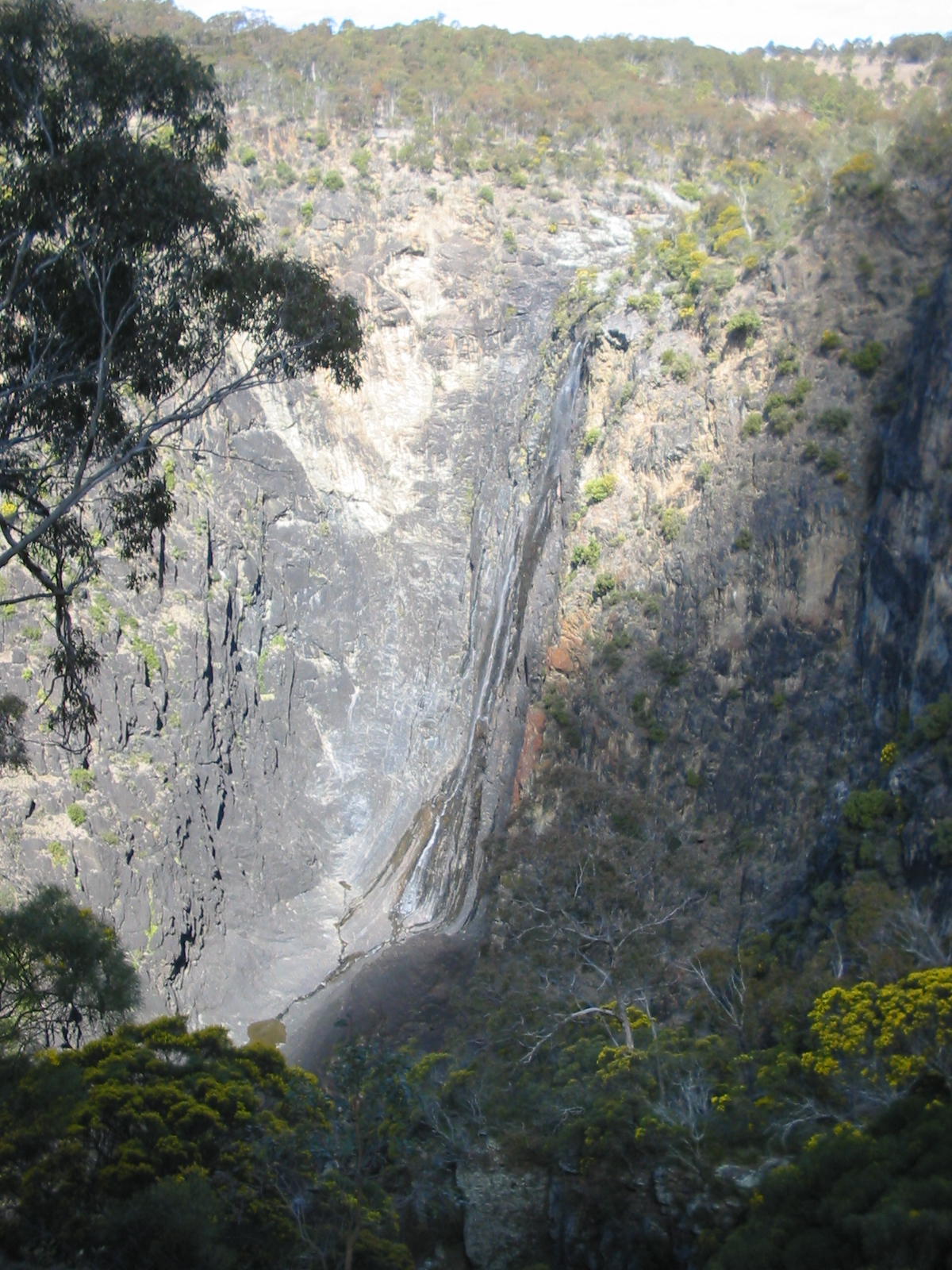
Dangars Falls, near Armidale

The Dangars Gorge and Falls are located 22 kilometres (14 mi) south-east of Armidale along the Dangersleigh Road and are home to the beautiful Dangars Falls, and the starting point for several great walks. McDirtys Walk - 6.9 km, 3 hours, medium difficulty. From the carpark at Dangars Gorge, cross the river and follow the track to the lookout above the falls (1.4 kilometres return), and Rock Wallaby Lookout (2.1 kilometres return). The track follows the gorge rim along a ridge to McDirtys Lookout (6.9 kilometres return). There are good places for picnics, camping and bushwalking. Salisbury Waters Walk - 14 km, 8 hours, difficult. This walk is an excellent introduction to gorge bushwalking, and can be undertaken in one strenuous or two leisurely days. From Dangars carpark cross the river (if the river is high do not attempt to cross), and follow the track past the turn off to McDirtys, heading out along the ridge as sign-posted to Sarum Hill Lookout (10.7 kilometres return), descending 500 metres to Salisbury Waters (14 kilometres return).

=== Other campgrounds ===
The Long Point campground is accessible via the historic gold mining town of Hillgrove from the Waterfall Way, 32 kilometres (20 mi) east of Armidale to the Hillgrove turnoff. Head south from Hillgrove for 17 kilometres (11 mi) along the gravel road. Located in a small forest clearing, this campground gives ready access to the easy 1.5-kilometre (0.93 mi) Cassinia Walk; the medium difficulty 6-kilometre (3.7 mi) Chandler View Circuit Walk; and the 33-kilometre (21 mi) difficult Long Point to Wollomombi overnight bushwalk. For the latter walk a vehicle drop-off and pick-up and suitable equipment are needed. Basic track notes are available from the NPWS Armidale office. Long Point has two formal lookouts along the Chandler View Circuit walk and Cassinia Walk offering views over the Chandler and Macleay Gorges. Facilities include a carpark, shelter shed with fireplace, picnic tables with small wood barbecues, tank water, pit toilets, an information display and bush camping with firewood supplied.

4WD vehicles are permitted to access Riverside, Youdales Hut and East Kunderang Homestead where a permit and key are required. Riverside and Youdales Hut require a low range 4WD vehicle and trailers are not permitted.

The Riverside Rest Area is on the banks of the Apsley River, 50 kilometres (31 mi) east of Walcha and is reached by the Moona Plains Road. The trail from Budds Mare Rest Area is a steep gravel track and a 4WD with low range is necessary. Trailers are not permitted. Fees apply, a locked gate key and permit are essential to use this trail with a vehicle. The Riverside Trail was opened in April 1997 to permit vehicle access to the Macleay Gorges area. The road down to the river shows the diversity of flora as you drop in elevation and visitors can experience groves of native hibiscus (Hibiscus heterophyllus) and get to see river bank terraces shaded with large, fuzzy box (Eucalyptus conica). Bluff Rock (or The Terrace) walk - 1.5-kilometre (0.93 mi), one hour, medium difficulty, is reached by heading north-west from the visitor area, across a gully and up the hill to the management trail which leads to the top of the bluff rock, overlooking the river and across to Paradise Rocks. Activities: swimming, hiking, fishing and photography. Facilities: 13 camp sites, toilets, picnic tables, electric/gas barbecues, wood barbecues, firewood supplied.

The Halls Peak camping area is located off Raspberry Road, east of Armidale. The very steep 4WD trail, suitable only for vehicles with a low range, continues on down to a good camping area on the Chandler River. The new facility consists of thirteen camping sites with pit fires, tables, barbecues and toilets. There are several mines in this area and the Halls Peak Mine may be seen from near the camping area.

=== Youdales Hut ===
The Youdales Hut is an historic pioneering timber slab walled hut that was built in the 1930s on a small pastoral run established in the Kunderang Gorges. Alan Youdale is believed to have been guided here by an Aboriginal man, and he then settled here in circa 1939. This camping ground is approximately 96 kilometres (60 mi) from Walcha and can be accessed via Kangaroo Flat Road, which leaves the Oxley Highway 55 kilometres (34 mi) from Walcha. The trail is narrow and steep and a 4WD with low range is necessary. Trailers are not permitted. Access is also possible via Carrai Road, Coachwood Road and the Racecourse Trail from Kempsey, or the Hastings Forest Way and Racecourse Trail from Port Macquarie. Visitor numbers are limited so bookings are essential. A permit and key is necessary to gain entry to this area and they may be obtained from Apsley Motors or the Park office, Walcha. The area caters for both picnickers and campers, with wood barbecues (wood provided), toilet and interpretation display at the hut. It's ideal for picnics, swimming and short walks.

=== East Kunderang Homestead ===
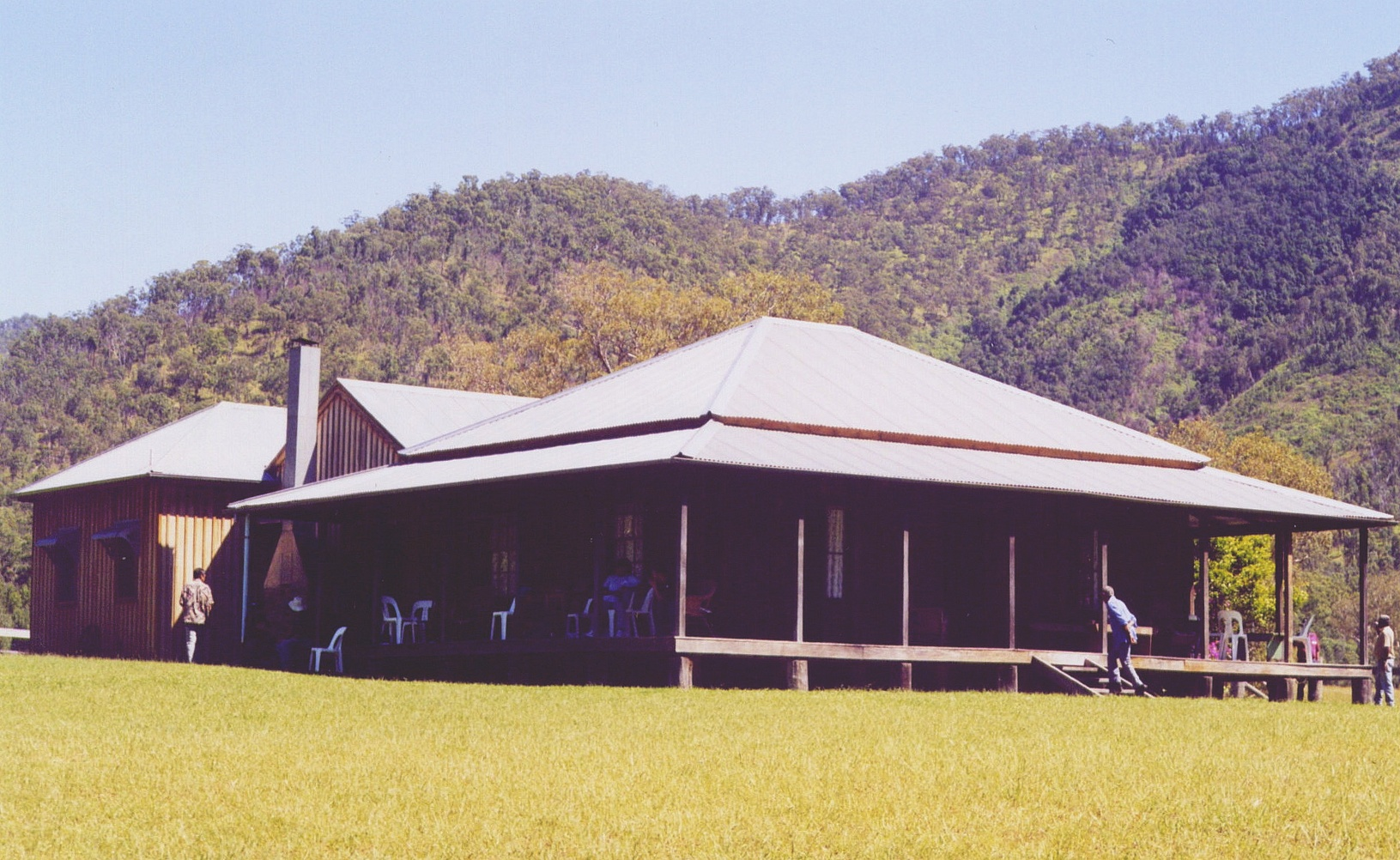
The East Kunderang homestead

The East Kunderang Homestead is set on the banks of the Macleay River, 112 kilometres (70 mi) east of Armidale via Wollomombi and the Kempsey Road. Access to the homestead is along steep gravel roads and a 4WD is required along with a permit. This historic homestead built in the 1890s, of solid cedar throughout, was once the centre of a grazing empire. It has now been carefully restored by the National Parks and Wildlife Service to provide comfortable and modern accommodation. Edward Fitzgerald's grave is uphill from the rear of the homestead near a clump of gum trees along the fence line. Edward was drowned in 1900 while returning on horseback from the mail run. The homestead may be booked for up to ten people for a minimum of two nights.

Marys View, a lookout situated on a bluff about 3 kilometres (1.9 mi) south east of East Kunderang homestead, has perhaps the best view of any lookout of the Macleay Gorges. This lookout can be accessed as a day walk from East Kunderang. From here you have a 300 degree view almost from Point Lookout in New England National Park near Dorrigo back to Mummel Gulf National Park near Walcha. On a clear day you can see Mount Duval near Armidale, more than 70 kilometres (43 mi) away. A 4WD vehicle is needed to access Marys View, from outside the national park, and it is at least a seven–hour return trip from either Walcha or Armidale and onto the Carrai tableland. There is no vehicle access from East Kunderang.

=== Bicentennial National Trail ===
The Bicentennial National Trail for walking and horse riding passes from Cedar Creek on the edge of Werrikimbe National Park past Youdales Hut via East Kunderang to Georges Junction on the Armidale to Kempsey road, which is a distance of some 75 kilometres (47 mi) through the national park. The track is mostly unmarked but follows Kunderang Brook as it descends into the Macleay past East Kunderang Homestead in Oxley Wild Rivers National Park. The walk takes at least five days and all food and equipment has to be carried and there are numerous creek and river crossings, with some steep ascents and descents. This route generally takes at least four days to ride, and can be impassable after rain – check with Armidale or Walcha NPWS for details. Huts at Left Hand and Middle Yards are managed for their cultural heritage value, but are available for use while on the National Trail. The historic, remote Middle Yards Hut, located on Kunderang Brook deep within Oxley Wild Rivers National Park, has been restored to its original condition by the NPWS. A holding yard for horse trekkers was constructed here, along with a hitching rail, period furniture inside the hut, an outdoor barbecue and new water tank. Horses are not permitted at East Kunderang homestead.

=== Gara Gorge ===
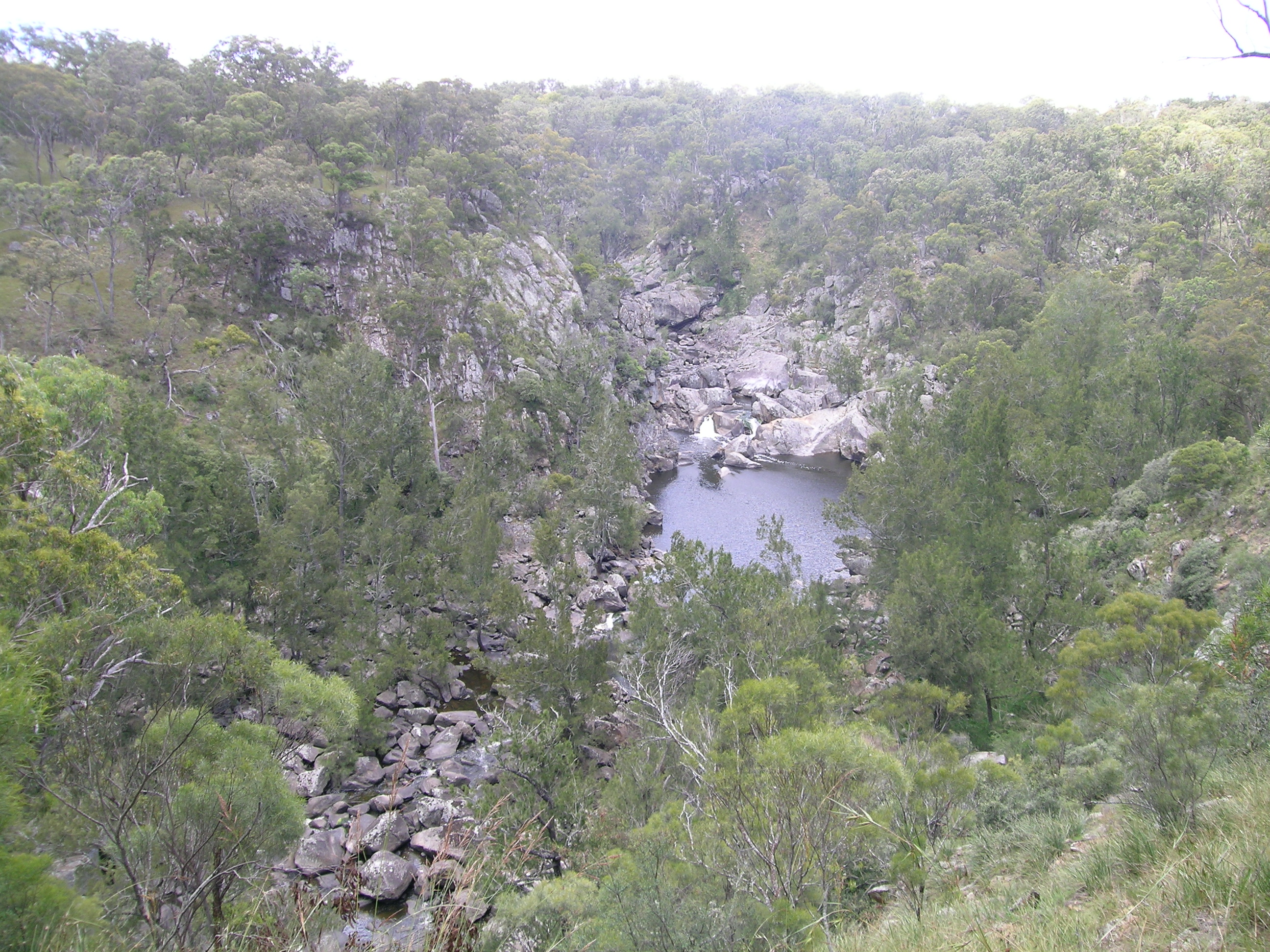
The Gara Gorge, near Armidale

The Gara Gorge is located 18 kilometres (11 mi) south-east of Armidale along the Castledoyle Road off the Waterfall Way just east of Armidale. The remains of Australia's first public hydro-electric scheme can be viewed here. Gara Gorge is a picnic area with tables, drinking water, toilets and gas barbecues. Known for scenic bush strolls and the Blue Hole which is commonly used for swimming. The 5-kilometre (3.1 mi) Threlfall Walk follows the route of the historic 1894 hydro-electric scheme, along old embankments and through ancient cuttings, to a lookout platform high above the river. Crombies Cave, the longest granite cave in Australia at 832 metres (2,730 ft), can be found in the next small creek, Powers Creek, an easy walk to the south of the Blue Hole. As the creek flows under the fence from the surrounding grazing country, within 20 metres (66 ft) it begins its journey underground to come out 832 metres (2,730 ft) down stream. The cave can be accessed from here and negotiated for at least half its length. It contains very beautiful granite sculptures, gnammas and potholes, some big caverns and a small sandy beach near the lower exit. A climb down a small waterfall and a curving squeeze can be difficult for some to negotiate. The exits downstream can be difficult to find from the outside.

== Weeds and feral animals ==
=== Weeds ===
The most significant introduced species are giant Parramatta grass (Sporobolus fertilis), lantana (Lantana camara), prickly pear (Opuntia), blue heliotrope and blackberry. Lantana was widely distributed in warmer lower areas of the park and also invaded rainforest thickets, where it has affected World Heritage values. Burrs of the Xanthium spp. are found on river flats, banks and associated tributaries.

Blackberry, giant Parramatta grass, lantana and sweet briar (Rosa rubiginosa) are being controlled using herbicide. Spraying results have been encouraging but follow-up spraying is imperative to ensure long-term effectiveness. The release of the cactus moth Cactoblastis cactorum within the park has facilitated the biological control of prickly pear.

=== Feral animals ===
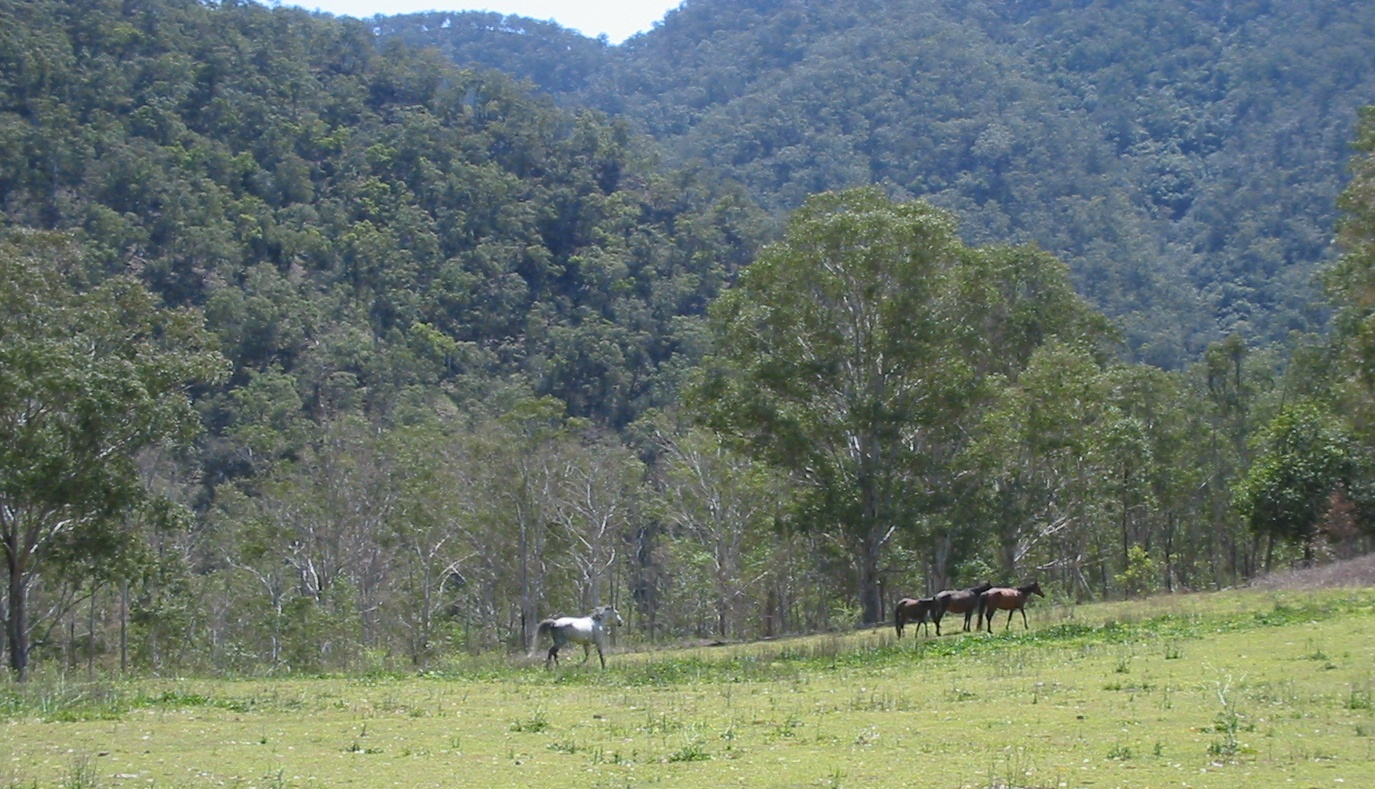
Brumbies on the Chandler River

Feral cats and foxes occur in moderate numbers and can impact on native fauna. Wild dogs occur in the park and include dingoes, hybrids with domestic dogs. The National Parks and Wildlife Service give assistance to nearby landowners with respect to the control of these canine species. Wild dogs are controlled using a combination of methods, including baiting, aerial shooting and cooperative fencing with neighbours. Feral pigs have a large impact on the park and cause ground disturbance that encourages soil erosion and weed invasion. Pigs are trapped, poisoned and are also controlled with ground and aerial shooting. Feral goats are confined to the upper Chandler, Styx, Oaky, and Apsley rivers. They compete with the threatened brush-tailed rock-wallabies for food and shelter. The goats are controlled using ground and aerial shooting. Over 100 head of feral horses (brumbies) have been passively trapped in the Apsley catchment then re-homed.

== Adjoining national parks ==
- Carrai National Park
- Cunnawarra National Park
- Werrikimbe National Park
- Willi Willi National Park

== See also ==
- Protected areas of New South Wales

== Bibliography ==
- Harrison, Rodney; "Shared Landscapes", p. 86, UNSW Press, Sydney, 2004, ISBN 0-86840-559-0
