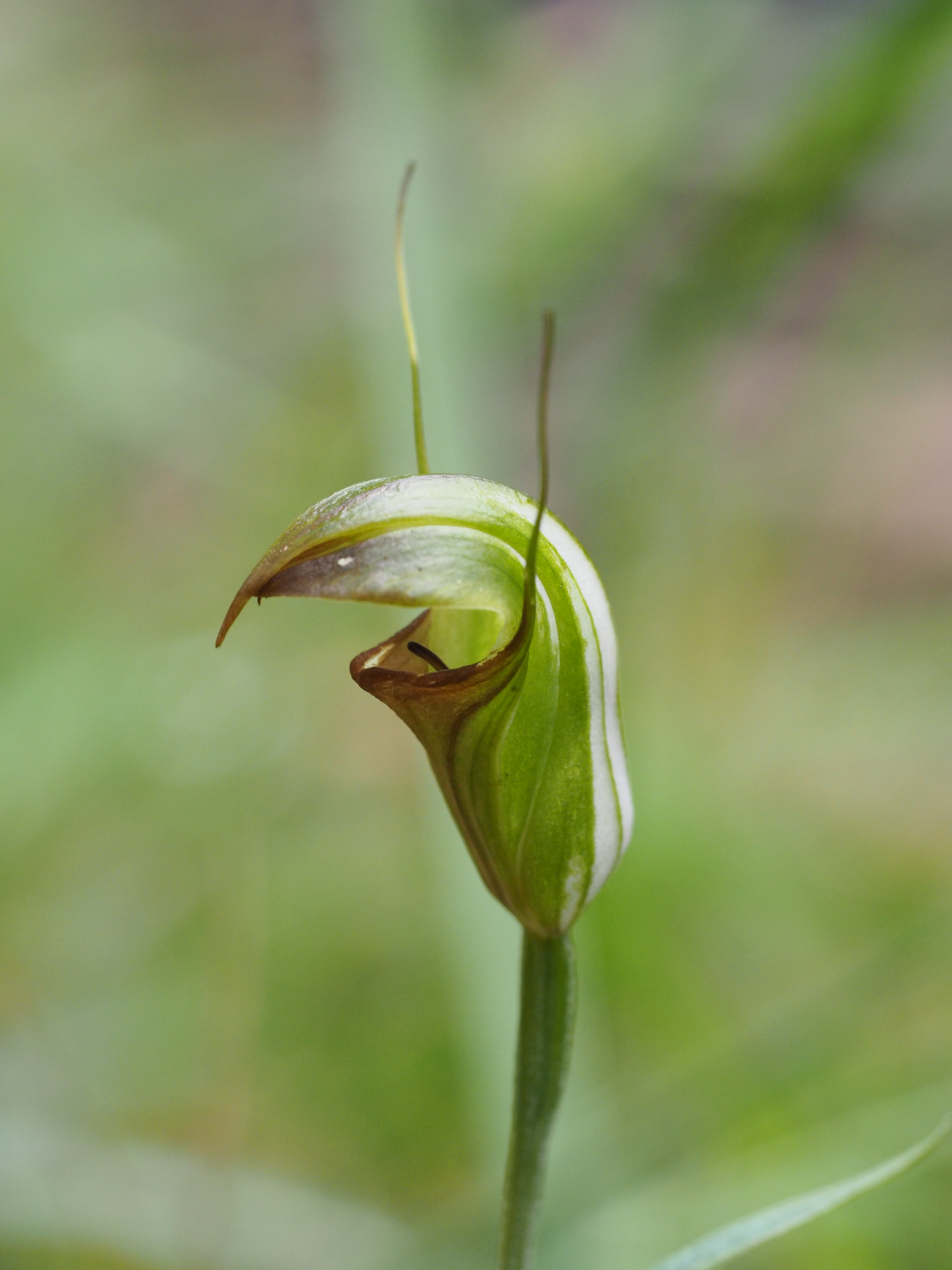
- At Apsley Falls

Scientific classification
- Kingdom: Plantae
- Clade: Tracheophytes
- Clade: Angiosperms
- Clade: Monocots
- Order: Asparagales
- Family: Orchidaceae
- Subfamily: Orchidoideae
- Tribe: Cranichideae
- Genus: Pterostylis
- Species: P. torquata

Binomial name
- Pterostylis torquata D.L.Jones

Synonyms
- Diplodium torquatum (D.L.Jones) D.L.Jones & M.A.Clem.

= Pterostylis torquata =

Collared greenhood

Species of orchid

Pterostylis torquata, commonly known as the collared greenhood, is a species of orchid endemic to New South Wales. As with similar greenhoods, the flowering plants differ from those which are not flowering. The non-flowering plants have a rosette of leaves flat on the ground but the flowering plants have a single flower with leaves on the flowering stem. This greenhood has a white flower with dark green and dark brown markings, although in some areas, the flowers lack the brown markings. The sinus between the lateral sepals is platform-like.

== Description ==
Pterostylis torquata is a terrestrial, perennial, deciduous, herb with an underground tuber and when not flowering, a rosette of dark green leaves lying flat on the ground. Each leaf is 15–25 mm (0.6–1 in) long and 10–15 mm (0.4–0.6 in) wide. Flowering plants have a single erect flower 18–21 mm (0.7–0.8 in) long and 7–9 mm (0.3–0.4 in) wide on a flowering stem 100–200 mm (4–8 in) high with between three and five spreading stem leaves. The flower is usually white with dark green and dark brown markings. The dorsal sepal and petals are fused, forming a hood or "galea" over the column, the dorsal sepal with a short point on its end. The lateral sepals have erect, thread-like tips 15–20 mm (0.6–0.8 in) long. The sinus between the lateral sepals bulges platform-like and is usually dark brown. The labellum is curved, blackish, blunt, 9–11 mm (0.35–0.43 in) long, about 3 mm (0.1 in) wide and just visible above the sinus. Flowering occurs from February to May.

== Taxonomy and naming ==
Pterostylis torquata was first formally described in 1997 by David Jones from a specimen collected on the Northern Tablelands and the description was published in The Orchadian. The specific epithet (torquata) is a Latin word "adorned with a necklace or collar".

== Distribution and habitat ==
The collared greenhood grows in forest on the Northern Tablelands.
