= P. cinnabarina =

P. cinnabarina may refer to:

- Passiflora cinnabarina, an Old World plant
- Pulvinula cinnabarina, an apothecial fungus
