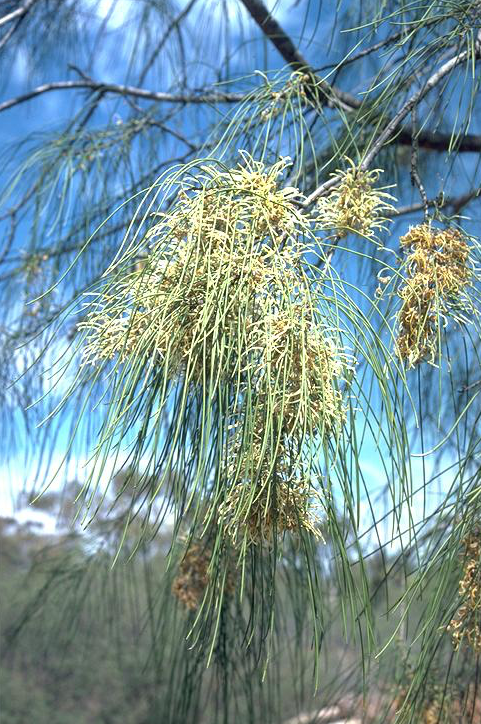

Conservation status
- Vulnerable (IUCN 3.1)

Scientific classification
- Kingdom: Plantae
- Clade: Tracheophytes
- Clade: Angiosperms
- Clade: Eudicots
- Order: Proteales
- Family: Proteaceae
- Genus: Hakea
- Species: H. fraseri

Binomial name
- Hakea fraseri R.Br.

= Hakea fraseri =

Species of shrub endemic to New South Wales, Australia

Hakea fraseri, the corkwood oak, is a species of shrub or small tree in the family Proteaceae and is endemic to northern New South Wales. It has furrowed bark, pendulous foliage and creamy-white flowers in spring.

== Description ==
Hakea fraseri is a shrub or small tree growing to 1–6 m (3 ft 3 in – 19 ft 8 in) high with multiple stems, dark grey rough bark and does not form a lignotuber. The branchlets are a whitish colour, covered with flattened, soft hairs, new shoots glossy rusty coloured hairs over glossy white hairs. The leaves are simple, varying length with a weeping habit, 11–30 cm (4.3–11.8 in) long 0.9–1.4 mm (0.035–0.055 in) wide, more or less smooth and ending with hook. The inflorescence consists of 25–50 cream-white flowers borne in leaf axils on a stalk 9–25 mm (0.35–0.98 in) long that is covered with reddish-brown, short, matted hairs over whitish flattened hairs. The pedicel 3.5–8 mm (0.14–0.31 in) long, thickly covered with flattened hairs that extend onto the cream-white perianth when in bud, the pistil 17–26 mm (0.67–1.02 in) long. The fruit is narrowly egg-shaped, 30–40 mm (1.2–1.6 in) long, 11–17 mm (0.43–0.67 in) wide and a long obscure beak. Flowering occurs in spring.

== Taxonomy and naming ==
This species was first formally described in 1830 by Robert Brown and the description was published in Supplementum primum prodromi florae Novae Hollandiae. The specific epithet (fraseri) honours Charles Fraser the first colonial botanist and Superintendent of the New South Wales botanic gardens.

== Distribution and habitat ==
Corkwood oak is a rare species in New South Wales confined to the New England Tablelands below Wollomombi, Dangar, Tia and Apsley Falls on steep slopes and vertical rock situations in gorges.
