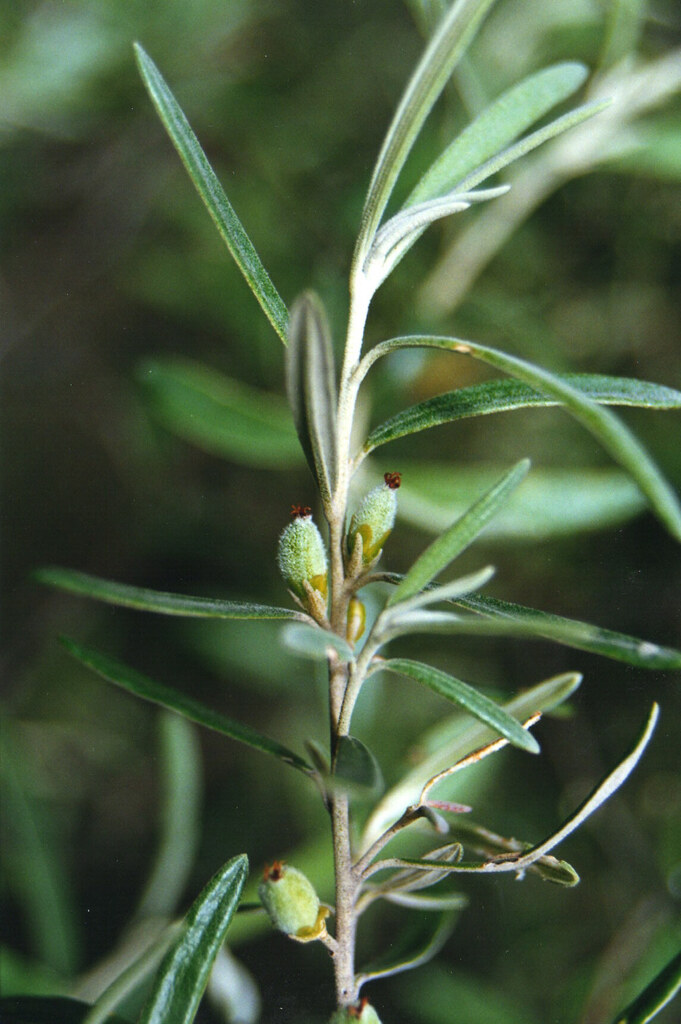
- On the Northern Tablelands

Conservation status
- Endangered (EPBC Act)

Scientific classification
- Kingdom: Plantae
- Clade: Tracheophytes
- Clade: Angiosperms
- Clade: Eudicots
- Clade: Rosids
- Order: Malpighiales
- Family: Euphorbiaceae
- Genus: Bertya
- Species: B. ingramii

Binomial name
- Bertya ingramii T.A.James
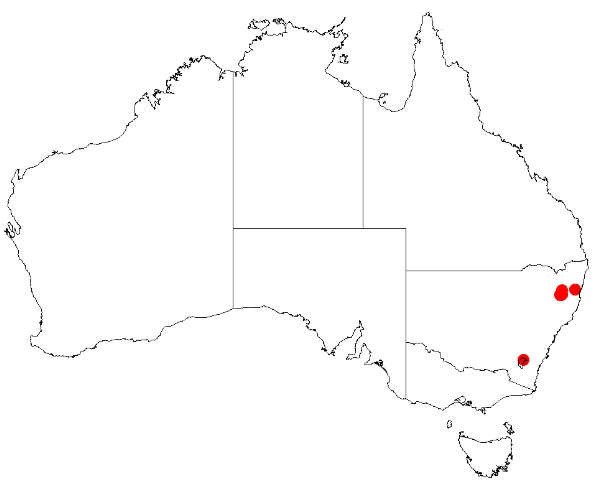
- Occurrence data from Australasian Virtual Herbarium

= Bertya ingramii =

Species of flowering plant

Bertya ingramii, commonly known as narrow-leafed bertya, is a species of flowering plant in the family Euphorbiaceae and is endemic to New South Wales. It is a slender to rounded shrub with linear to narrowly lance-shaped or narrowly elliptic leaves, separate male and female flowers arranged singly in leaf axils and oval capsules.

== Description ==
Bertya ingramii is a slender to rounded, monoecious shrub that has young stems with woolly, greyish-white hairs. Its leaves are linear to narrowly lance-shaped with the narrower end towards the base, or narrowly elliptic, 10–35 mm (0.39–1.38 in) long and 1–4 mm (0.039–0.157 in) wide, the edges curved downwards, on a petiole 1–3 mm (0.039–0.118 in) long. The upper surface of the leaves has a few star-shaped hairs at first, later scaly, the lower surface whitish-grey to pale yellowish with woolly, star-shaped hairs. The flowers are arranged singly in leaf axils and more or less sessile or on a peduncle up to 1 mm (0.039 in) long. There are six to seven bracts, the outer bracts thick, densely hairy, 1.5–3 mm (0.059–0.118 in) long the inner bracts 2 mm (0.079 in) wide and more or less glabrous. Male flowers have oblong to elliptic, overlapping brown tepals 3 mm (0.12 in) long, the stamen column 4–5 mm (0.16–0.20 in) long. Female flowers are 2–3 mm (0.079–0.118 in) long and joined at their lower sides, the ovary is hairy, much longer than the tepals, and the three styles are each deeply divided. Flowerring occurs from August to November and the fruit is a capsule 8–10 mm (0.31–0.39 in) long with glossy, reddish-brown seeds about 6 mm (0.24 in) long.

== Taxonomy ==
Bertya ingramii was first formally named in 1988 by Teresa Ann James from specimens collected by John Beaumont Williams on the top of Dangars Falls near Armidale in 1964. The specific epithet (ingrami) honours Mr C. Keith Ingram of Mount Tomah. It was one of eleven species selected for the Save a Species Walk campaign in April 2016; scientists walked 300 km to raise money for collection of seeds to be prepared and stored at the Australian PlantBank at the Australian Botanic Garden Mount Annan.

== Distribution and habitat ==
Narrow-leafed bertya grows among rocks or in thin soils close to cliff edges in dry woodland at Dangars Falls, nearby Mihi Gorge and Gara Falls in the Oxley Wild Rivers National Park near Armidale.

== Conservation status ==
Bertia ingramii is classified as "endangered" under the Environment Protection and Biodiversity Conservation Act 1999.
