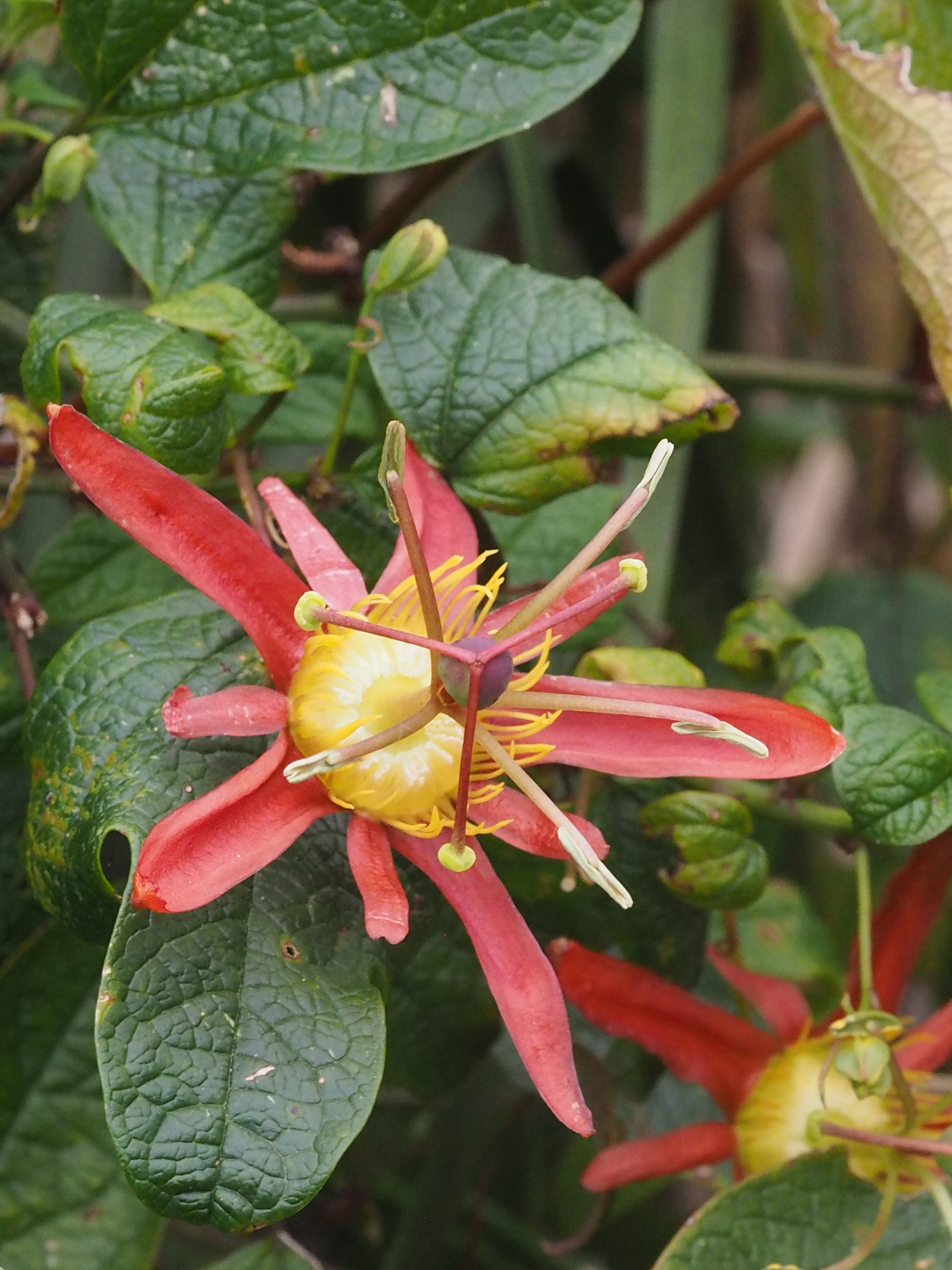

Scientific classification
- Kingdom: Plantae
- Clade: Tracheophytes
- Clade: Angiosperms
- Clade: Eudicots
- Clade: Rosids
- Order: Malpighiales
- Family: Passifloraceae
- Genus: Passiflora
- Species: P. cinnabarina

Binomial name
- Passiflora cinnabarina Lindl.

= Passiflora cinnabarina =

Red passionflower

Species of vine

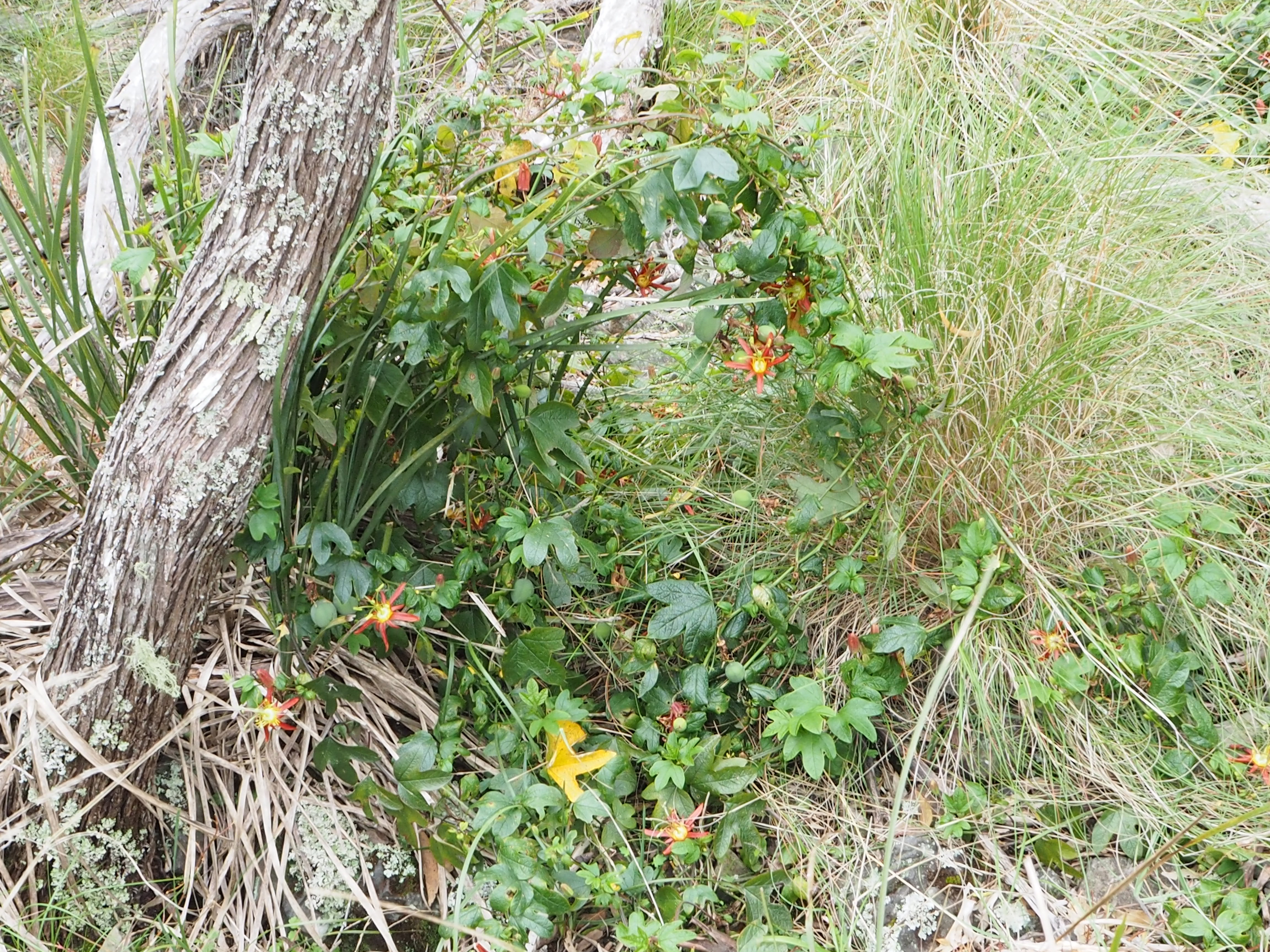
Habit near Dangars Falls

Passiflora cinnabarina, commonly known as red passionflower, is a species of flowering plant in the family Passifloraceae and is endemic to south-eastern Australia. It is a climber or scrambler with three-lobed leaves and red flowers.

== Description ==
Passiflora cinnabarina is a glabrous climber or scrambler with slender stems up to 4 m (13 ft) long and with simple tendrils in the leaf axils. The leaves are up to 10 cm (3.9 in) long and wide with three lobes, on a petiole 20–50 mm (0.79–1.97 in) long with narrow lance-shaped stipules 3–10 mm (0.12–0.39 in) long at the base. The flowers are borne singly in leaf axils and are 4–7 cm (1.6–2.8 in) in diameter on a pedicel 3–5 cm (1.2–2.0 in) long with three thread-like bracts at the base. The sepals are 20–35 mm (0.79–1.38 in) long and keeled, red on the inside and green outside. The petals are red, 8–15 mm (0.31–0.59 in) long and the corona consists of two rings of filaments, the outer ring yellow and 6–12 mm (0.24–0.47 in) long and the inner series whitish and usually 5–6 mm (0.20–0.24 in) long. The gynophore is 20–40 mm (0.79–1.57 in) long and there are five stamens and three styles. Flowering occurs from September to January and the fruit is a green berry.

== Taxonomy ==
Passiflora cinnibarina was first formally described in 1855 by John Lindley in The Gardeners' Chronicle and Agricultural Gazette from plants grown from seed collected by "Lieut.-Colonel Sir Thomas Mitchell". The specific epithet (cinnibarina) is a Latin words meaning vermilion.

== Distribution and habitat ==
Red passionflower grows along rivers in rainforest and forest, often in rocky sites and occurs from northern New South Wales, along the coast and ranges through the Australian Capital Territory to eastern Victoria. It has also become naturalised in a few sites in Tasmania.

== Ecology ==
The seeds of P. cinnabarina are spread by birds and possibly mammals and the plant has become an environmental weed in Victoria, Tasmania and New Zealand.

== Use in horticulture ==
This climber can be propagated from seed or from cuttings and can be grown in full sun to semi shade. It is relatively frost-tolerant but requires moist soil.
