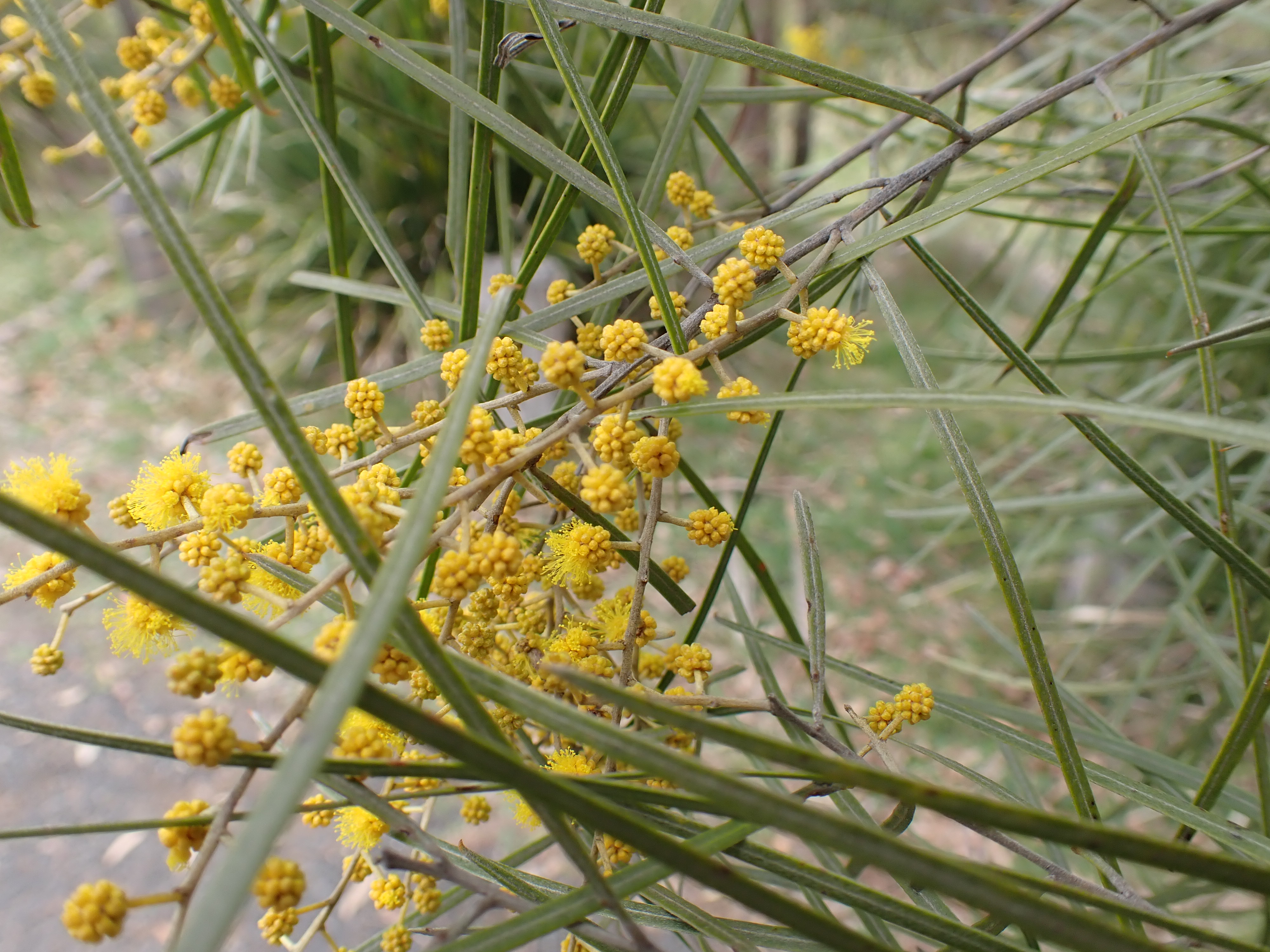

Scientific classification
- Kingdom: Plantae
- Clade: Embryophytes
- Clade: Tracheophytes
- Clade: Spermatophytes
- Clade: Angiosperms
- Clade: Eudicots
- Clade: Rosids
- Order: Fabales
- Family: Fabaceae
- Subfamily: Caesalpinioideae
- Clade: Mimosoid clade
- Genus: Acacia
- Species: A. ingramii

Binomial name
- Acacia ingramii Tindale
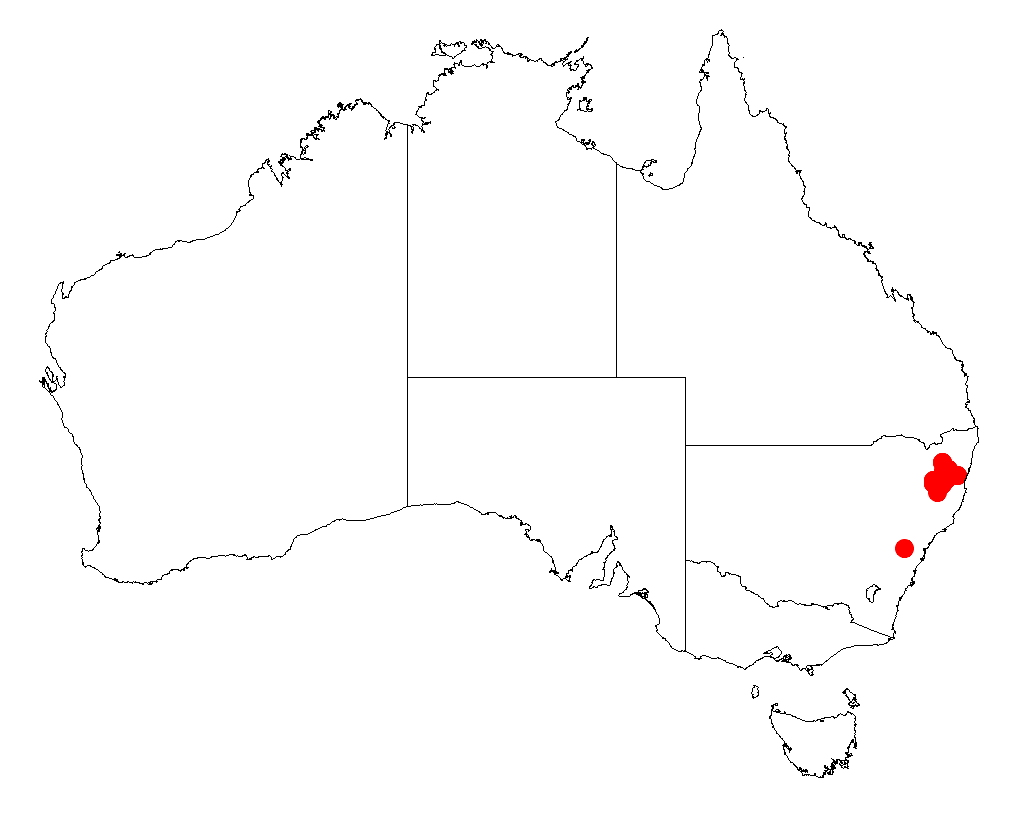
- Occurrence data from AVH

Synonyms
- Racosperma ingramii (Tindale) Pedley

= Acacia ingramii =

Ingram's wattle

Species of legume

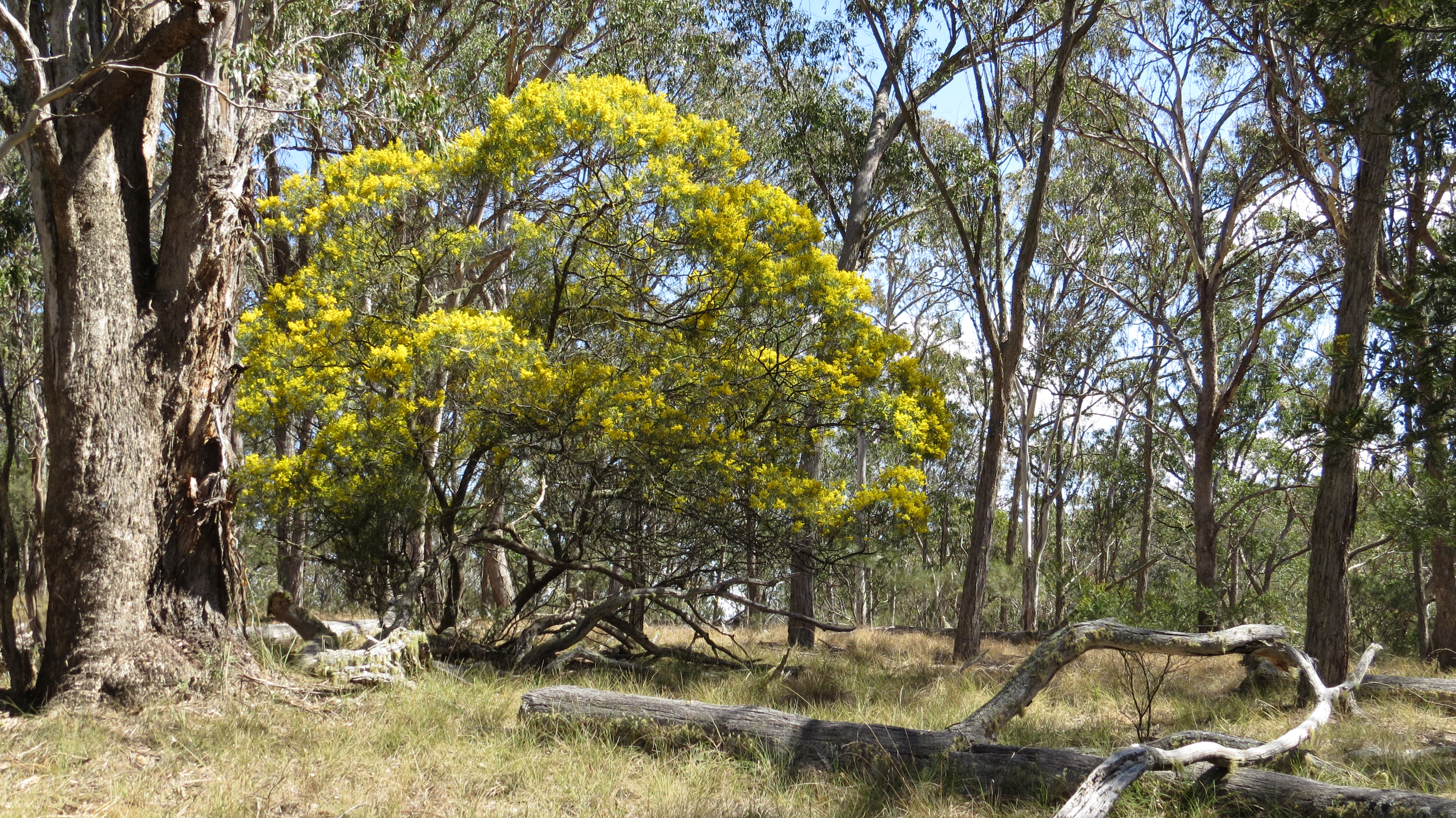
Habit at Wollomombi Falls

Acacia ingramii, commonly known as Ingram's wattle, is a species of flowering plant in the family Fabaceae and is endemic to northern New South Wales, Australia. It is a spreading, bushy shrub or tree with narrowly linear phyllodes with a more or less hooked tip, spherical heads of golden yellow flowers and firmly papery, convex pods.

== Description ==
Acacia ingramii is a spreading, bushy shrub or tree that typically grows to a height of 2–5 m (6 ft 7 in – 16 ft 5 in) and has smooth grey bark. The branchlets are dark coloured with soft, white hairs pressed against the surface. The phyllodes are narrowly linear, 60–140 mm (2.4–5.5 in) long and 1.5–3.5 mm (0.059–0.138 in) wide with a more or less hooked tip. The phyllodes have a prominent midvein covered with pale yellow or white hairs, the lateral veins are obscure and there are one or two glands up to 5 mm (0.20 in) above the pulvinus. The flowers are borne in spherical heads on slender racemes 20–40 mm (0.79–1.57 in) long, each flower on a peduncle 2.5–5 mm (0.098–0.197 in) long with 14 to 22 golden yellow flowers. Flowering occurs from August to November, and the pods are convex over, and more or less constricted between the seeds, firmly papery and up to 110 mm (4.3 in) long and 5–8 mm (0.20–0.31 in) wide. The seeds are oblong, 4.5–5.0 mm (0.18–0.20 in) long with an aril on the end.

== Taxonomy ==
Acacia ingramii was first formally described in 1978 by Mary Tindale in the journal Telopea from specimens collected at Wollomombi Falls in 1974. The specific epithet honours Cyril Keith Ingram who first recognised it as a new species.

== Distribution and habitat ==
Ingram's wattle occurs in the upper catchment of the Macleay River in New South Wales to the east of Armidale. It grows in rugged gorge country in tall scrub or eucalypt woodland in soils derived from slates, mostly in the gorges from around Apsley Falls to Wollomombi Falls and also in the Guy Fawkes River National Park.

== See also ==
- List of Acacia species
