= Eucalyptus retinens =

Hillgrove box

Conservation status
- Data Deficient (IUCN 3.1)

Scientific classification
- Kingdom: Plantae
- Clade: Tracheophytes
- Clade: Angiosperms
- Clade: Eudicots
- Clade: Rosids
- Order: Myrtales
- Family: Myrtaceae
- Genus: Eucalyptus
- Species: E. retinens

Binomial name
- Eucalyptus retinens L.A.S.Johnson & K.D.Hill

Species of eucalyptus

Eucalyptus retinens, commonly known as Hillgrove box, is a species of tree that is endemic to the Northern Tablelands of New South Wales. It has rough, fibrous or flaky bark on the trunk and larger branches, smooth bark on the thinner branches, lance-shaped adult leaves, flower buds in groups of seven, white flowers and cup-shaped, cylindrical or hemispherical fruit.

== Description ==
Eucalyptus retinens is a tree that typically grows to a height of 20–25 m (66–82 ft) and forms a lignotuber. The bark on the trunk and larger branches is rough, fibrous or flaky and grey and the bark on the thinner branches is grey to greenish. Young plants and coppice regrowth have stems that are square in cross-section and sessile leaves that are 35–100 mm (1.4–3.9 in) long, 25–80 mm (0.98–3.15 in) wide and arranged in opposite pairs with their bases surrounding the stem. Adult leaves are the same shade of glossy green on both sides, lance-shaped or curved, 90–300 mm (3.5–11.8 in) long and 10–40 mm (0.39–1.57 in) wide, tapering to a petiole 12–40 mm (0.47–1.57 in) long. The flower buds are arranged in leaf axils in groups of seven on an unbranched peduncle 5–17 mm (0.20–0.67 in) long, the individual buds sessile or on pedicels up to 5 mm (0.20 in) long. Mature buds are oval to oblong, 7–10 mm (0.28–0.39 in) long and 3–5 mm (0.12–0.20 in) wide with a rounded or conical operculum. The flowers are white and the fruit is a woody, cup-shaped, cylindrical or hemispherical capsule 5–10 mm (0.20–0.39 in) long and 7–10 mm (0.28–0.39 in) wide with the valves protruding above the rim of the fruit.

== Taxonomy and naming ==
Eucalyptus retinens was first formally described in 1990 by Lawrie Johnson and Ken Hill in the journal Telopea from material collected north of Ebor in 1954. The specific epithet (retinens) is a Latin word meaning "retaining", referring to the persistent bark of this species.

== Distribution and habitat ==
Hillgrove box grows at the edge of steep gorges or on the top of steep ridges on the eastern parts of the Northern Tablelands.
