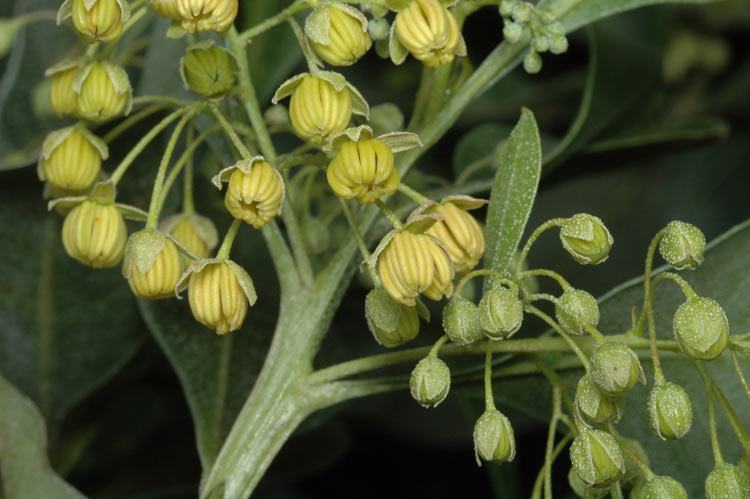
- Flowers in the Australian Botanic Garden Mount Annan

Scientific classification
- Kingdom: Plantae
- Clade: Tracheophytes
- Clade: Angiosperms
- Clade: Eudicots
- Clade: Rosids
- Order: Sapindales
- Family: Sapindaceae
- Genus: Dodonaea
- Species: D. rhombifolia

Binomial name
- Dodonaea rhombifolia N.A.Wakef.

= Dodonaea rhombifolia =

Broad-leaf hop-bush

Species of flowering plant

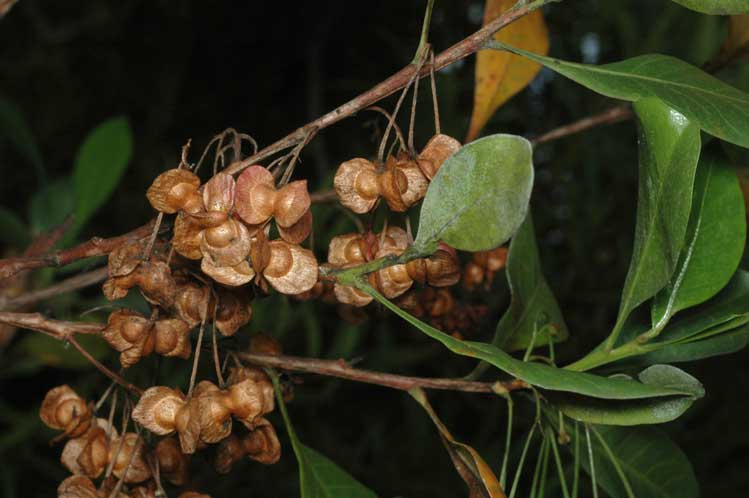
Fruit in the Australian National Botanic Gardens

Dodonaea rhombifolia, commonly known as broad-leaf hop-bush is a species of plant in the family Sapindaceae and is endemic to eastern Australia. It is an erect, dioecious shrub with simple, usually elliptic leaves, flowers arranged in cymess, the flowers usually with four sepals and eight stamens, and capsules with 4 wings.

== Description ==
Dodonaea rhombifolia is an erect, dioecious shrub that typically grows to a height of up to 1.5 m (4 ft 11 in) and has angular, ribbed or flattened branchlets. Its leaves are simple, usually elliptic, 50–90 mm (2.0–3.5 in) long and 14–27 mm (0.55–1.06 in) wide on a petiole 4–10.5 mm (0.16–0.41 in) long. The flowers are borne singly or in small numbers in cymes in leaf axils, each flower on a pedicel 3.5–8.5 mm (0.14–0.33 in) long. There are four lance-shaped to egg-shaped sepals 2–3.4 mm (0.079–0.134 in) long that fall off as the flower develops, and eight stamens. The ovary is glabrous and the capsule is 10–13 mm (0.39–0.51 in) long and 15–24 mm (0.59–0.94 in) wide with four membranous wings 6–8.5 mm (0.24–0.33 in) wide with dull, black lens-shaped seeds 2.8–3.0 mm (0.11–0.12 in) long.

== Taxonomy ==
Dodonaea rhombifolia was first formally described by in 1955 Norman Wakefield in The Victorian Naturalist from a specimen collected by Ferdinand von Mueller in "granitic gullies on the lower Hume River in 1874. The specific epithet (rhombifolia) means 'rhombus-leaved'.

== Distribution and habitat ==
Broad-leaf hop-bush grows in rocky granite or basalt soils in shrubland, near creeks in north-eastern and eastern Victoria, and in the north-east and far south-east of New South Wales.

== Conservation status ==
Dodonaea ronbifolia is listed as "vulnerable" under the Victorian Government Flora and Fauna Guarantee Act 1988.
