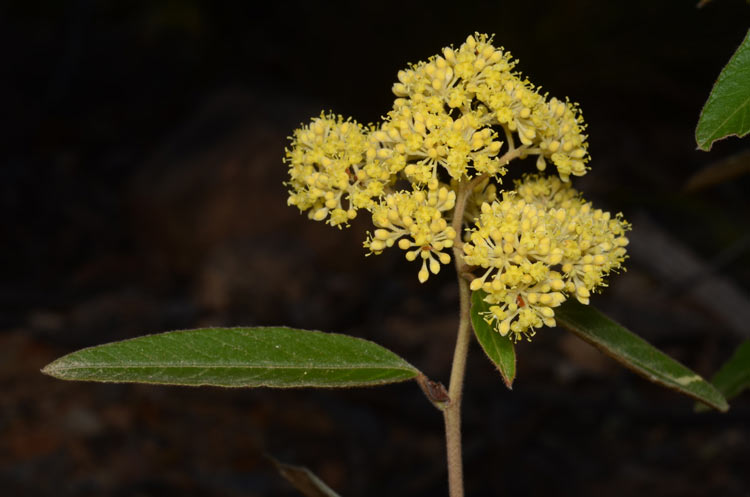
- Pomaderris lanigera in Expedition National Park

Scientific classification
- Kingdom: Plantae
- Clade: Tracheophytes
- Clade: Angiosperms
- Clade: Eudicots
- Clade: Rosids
- Order: Rosales
- Family: Rhamnaceae
- Genus: Pomaderris
- Species: P. lanigera

Binomial name
- Pomaderris lanigera (Andrews) Sims

Synonyms
- Ceanothus laniger Andrews; Pomaderris ferruginea var. pubescens Benth.; Pomaderris hirta Reissek; Pomaderris obscura Sieber ex Fenzl nom. inval., pro syn.; Pomaderris simsii Sweet nom. inval., nom. nud.

= Pomaderris lanigera =

Woolly pomaderris

Species of flowering plant

Pomaderris lanigera, commonly known as woolly pomaderris, is a species of flowering plant in the family Rhamnaceae and is endemic to south-eastern continental Australia. It is a shrub or small tree with hairy stems, lance-shaped to egg-shaped or elliptic leaves, and hemispherical clusters of yellow flowers.

== Description ==
Pomaderris lanigera is a shrub that typically grows to a height of 0.5–3 m (1 ft 8 in – 9 ft 10 in), its branchlets covered with shaggy, rust-coloured and star-shaped hairs. The leaves are lance-shaped to egg-shaped or elliptic, 40–130 mm (1.6–5.1 in) long and 20–50 mm (0.79–1.97 in) wide with stipules 4–6 mm (0.16–0.24 in) long at the base but that fall off as the leaf develops. The upper surface of the leaves has a few erect hairs and the lower surface is covered with shaggy, rust-coloured, star-shaped hairs. The flowers are yellow with shaggy rust-coloured hairs on the back and are arranged in more or less hemispherical panicles 40–120 mm (1.6–4.7 in) in diameter. Each flower is on a pedicel 2.5–5.5 mm (0.098–0.217 in) long with bracts at the base but that fall off as the flower opens. The floral cup is 1.0–1.5 mm (0.039–0.059 in) long, the sepals 2–3 mm (0.079–0.118 in) long but fall off as the flowers open, and the petals are spatula-shaped and 1.5–2.5 mm (0.059–0.098 in) long. Flowering occurs from August to October.

== Taxonomy ==
Woolly pomaderris was first formally described in 1809 by Henry Cranke Andrews who gave it the name Ceanothus laniger in The Botanist's Repository for New, and Rare Plants. In 1816, John Sims changed the name to Pomaderris lanigera in The Botanical Magazine. The specific epithet (lanigera) means "woolly".

== Distribution and habitat ==
Pomaderris lanigera is widespread in forest on the coast and nearby ranges from south-eastern Queensland through New South Wales to near Melbourne in Victoria.
