= Grevillea obtusiflora =

Conservation status
- Endangered (EPBC Act)

Scientific classification
- Kingdom: Plantae
- Clade: Tracheophytes
- Clade: Angiosperms
- Clade: Eudicots
- Order: Proteales
- Family: Proteaceae
- Genus: Grevillea
- Species: G. obtusiflora

Binomial name
- Grevillea obtusiflora R.Br.

Species of shrub endemic to Australia

Grevillea obtusiflora is a species of flowering plant in the family Proteaceae and is endemic to a small area of eastern New South Wales. It is a low, spreading to erect shrub with many stems, narrowly elliptic to oblong or linear to narrowly egg-shaped leaves with the narrower end towards the base, and pinkish-red and cream-coloured flowers with a red style.

== Description ==
Grevillea obtusiflora is a spreading to erect shrub that typically grows to a height of 0.2–1 m (7.9 in – 3 ft 3.4 in) has many stems. Its leaves are narrowly elliptic to oblong or linear to narrowly egg-shaped, mostly 20–30 mm (0.79–1.18 in) long and 1–4 mm (0.039–0.157 in) wide with the edges turned down or rolled under, sometimes covering the silky-hairy lower surface. The flowers are arranged on the ends of branches in sometimes branched clusters, each cluster with up to six flowers on a woolly-hairy rachis 1.5–3 mm (0.059–0.118 in) long. The flowers are pink to pinkish-red and cream-coloured with a red style, the pistil usually 18–23 mm (0.71–0.91 in) long. Flowering time varies with subspecies and the fruit is a narrowly elliptic follicle 11–13.5 mm (0.43–0.53 in) long.

== Taxonomy ==
Grevillea obtusiflora was first formally described in 1830 by Robert Brown in his Supplementum primum Prodromi florae Novae Hollandiae from specimens collected by Allan Cunningham in the Blue Mountains in 1822. The specific epithet (obtusiflora) means "blunt-flowered".

The names of two subspecies of G. obtusiflora have been accepted by the Australian Plant Census:

- Grevillea obtusiflora subsp. fecunda Makinson has leaves 1.0–1.2 mm (0.039–0.047 in) wide with the leaves turned down or rolled under, obscuring most of the lower surface, the pistil mostly 20–23 mm (0.79–0.91 in) long. Flowering occurs from August to December. This subspecies is only known to reproduce from rhizomes and does not develop fruit.
- Grevillea obtusiflora R.Br. subsp. obtusiflora has leaves 1.5–5 mm (0.059–0.197 in) wide with the leaves turned down or rolled under, but leaving most of the lower surface exposed, the pistil usually 15–19 mm (0.59–0.75 in) long. Flowering occurs from July to October. This subspecies reproduces from rhizomes but does develop fruit.

== Distribution and habitat ==
Subspecies fecunda grows in low, open forest near sandstone boulders in the catchment of the Capertee River at an altitude of about 570 m (1,870 ft) and subspecies obtusiflora is only known from a few collections near Clandulla where it is found in the understorey of forest.

== Conservation status ==
Both subspecies of G. obtusiflora are listed as "endangered" under the Australian Government Environment Protection and Biodiversity Conservation Act 1999 and the New South Wales Government Biodiversity Conservation Act 2016. The main threats to the subspecies include changes to natural fire regimes, roadside management activities, inappropriate land use and the small size of the populations of both subspecies. A recovery plan has been prepared.
