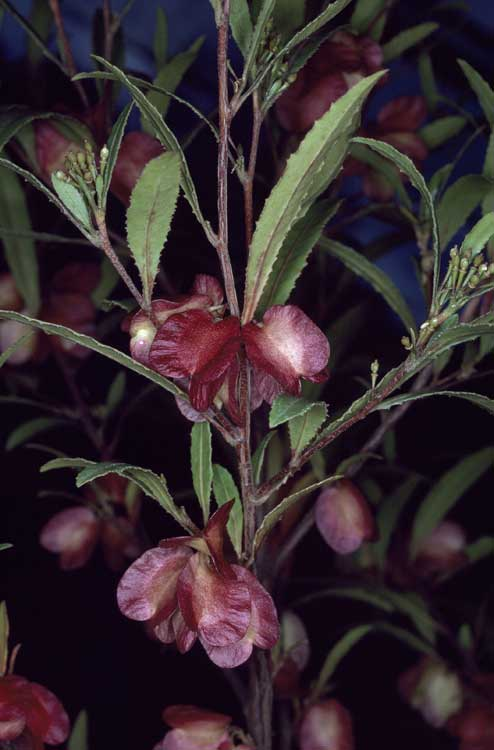
- In the Australian National Botanic Gardens

Scientific classification
- Kingdom: Plantae
- Clade: Tracheophytes
- Clade: Angiosperms
- Clade: Eudicots
- Clade: Rosids
- Order: Sapindales
- Family: Sapindaceae
- Genus: Dodonaea
- Species: D. serratifolia

Binomial name
- Dodonaea serratifolia McGill.

= Dodonaea serratifolia =

Species of plant

Dodonaea serratifolia is a species of flowering plant in the family Sapindaceae and is endemic to the Great Dividing Range in New South Wales, Australia. It is a polygamodioecious, erect shrub with simple, narrowly ellipic leaves with irregular serrations on the edges, flowers in cymes with four sepals, six to eight stamens, and capsules with four or five membranous wings.

== Description ==
Dodonaea serratifolia is an erect, polygamodioecious shrub that typically grows to a height of up to 1.5 m (4 ft 11 in). Its leaves are simple, glabrous, 35–72 mm (1.4–2.8 in) long and 6–12 mm (0.24–0.47 in) wide on a petiole 2.0–2.5 mm (0.079–0.098 in) long. The flowers are arranged in cymes of three to six on pedicels 2.0–2.5 mm (0.079–0.098 in) long. The flowers have four egg-shaped sepals 2.0–2.3 mm (0.079–0.091 in) long that fall off as the flowers open. There are six to eight stamens and the ovary is glabrous. The fruit is a glabrous, three- or four-winged, broadly elliptic capsule, 14–17 mm (0.55–0.67 in) long and 13–15 mm (0.51–0.59 in) wide, the wings 4–5 mm (0.16–0.20 in) wide and membranous.

== Taxonomy ==
Dodonaea serratifolia was first formally described in 1975 by Donald MacGillivray in the journal Telopea from specimens near Grassy Creek in the Gibraltar Range National Park in 1966. The specific epithet (serratifolia) means 'serrate-leaved'.

== Distribution and habitat ==
This species of Dodonaea grows in forest on granitic soils in a few populations along the Great Dividing Range from west of Grafton to west of Port Macquarie in New South Wales.
