= Apsley Falls =

Two waterfalls on the Apsley River in New South Wales, Australia

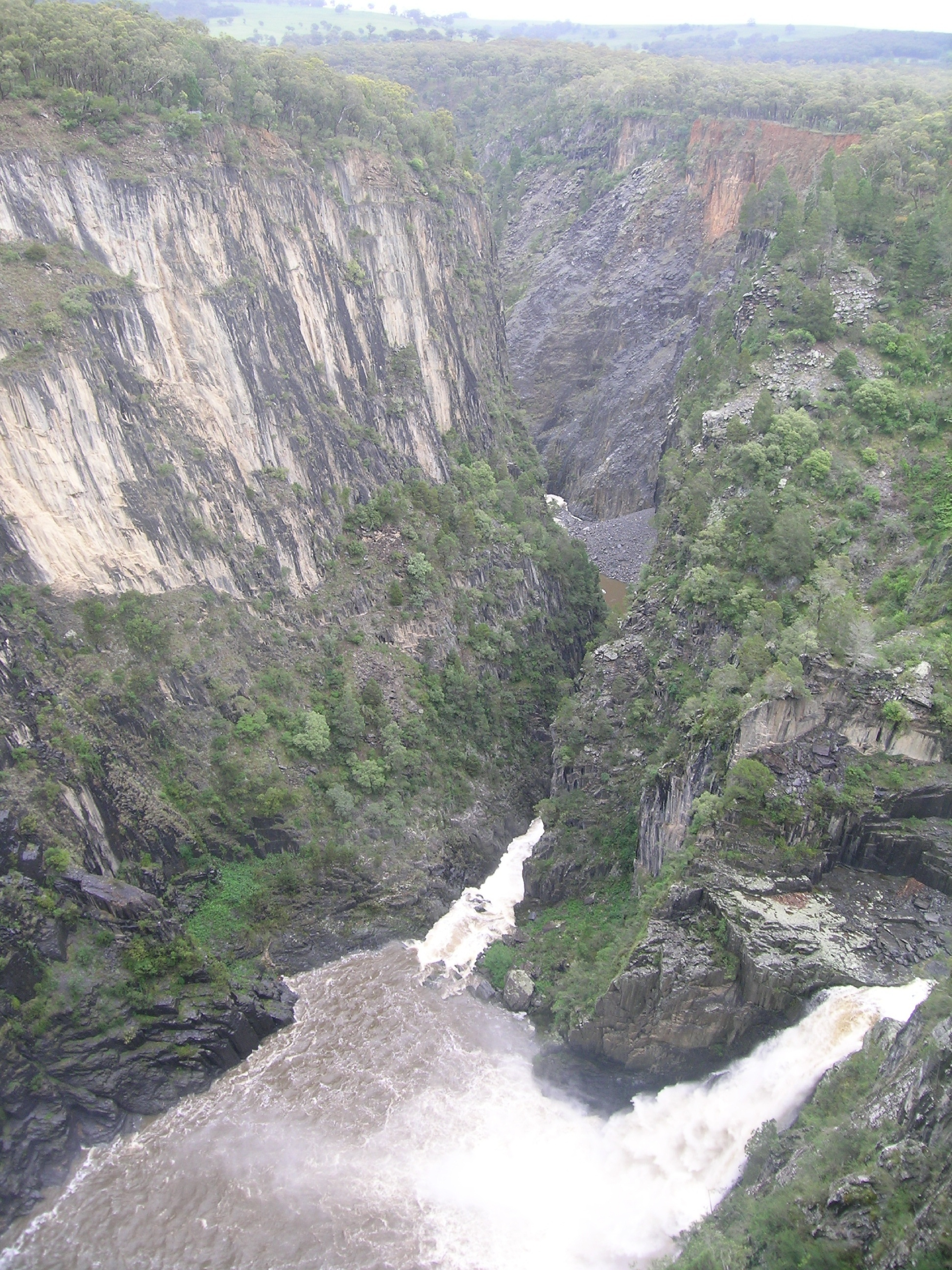
- The second drop of the Apsley Falls

- Location within New South Wales
- Location: Northern Tablelands, New South Wales, Australia
- Coordinates: 31°3′01″S 151°46′10″E
- Type: Cascade
- Total height: 123 metres (404 ft)
- Number of drops: 2
- Longest drop: 65 metres (213 ft)

The Apsley Falls are two waterfalls on the Apsley River in the Northern Tablelands region of New South Wales, Australia. The falls are located about 20 kilometres (12 mi) east of Walcha, and 1 kilometre off the Oxley Highway in a deep gorge in Oxley Wild Rivers National Park. They are the first falls in a succession of dramatic drops in an area that has some of the most remarkable scenery in Eastern Australia. The first drop of the falls is about 65 metres (213 ft) in depth, and the second, which is about 800 metres (2,625 ft) further on, plummets 58 metres (190 ft) to the bottom of the gorge.

== History ==
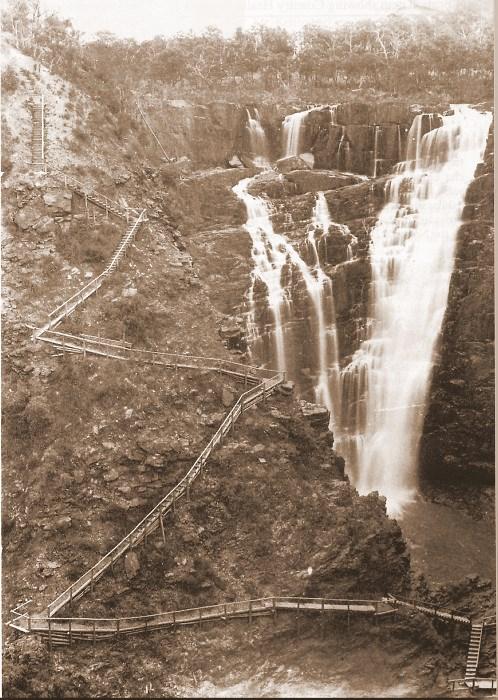
The old wooden stairway, Apsley Falls, Walcha.

Aboriginal people tell the story of how the Rainbow Serpent created the gorge at Apsley Falls in the Dreamtime. The Rainbow Serpent is said to travel underground from the base of the falls to reappear 20 km upstream at the Mill Hole on the Apsley River in Walcha. The site is now marked at the Mill Hole by the Rainbow Serpent mosaic made with the help of the local Aboriginal community.

Apart from Aboriginal significance of the area as a meeting place, John Oxley passed by the falls on 13 September 1818 and he named them the Bathurst Falls. He described it as "one of the most magnificent waterfalls we have seen".

Oxley named the Apsley River and wrote in his journal that he was "lost in astonishment at the sight of this wonderful natural sublimity".

In 1902 three men, Ted Baker, Jim McMillan and "Wattie" Joiner built the wooden stairway that zigzagged its way from the top of the gorge to the water's edge. All timber used in this dangerous and mammoth task was hand dressed with an axe and adze by this trio. The original stairway was used until 1932, when it was declared unsafe and partly demolished. in 2020 the wooden stairway was fully demolished.

Quite some time after parts of this stairway rotted and became dangerous, the Walcha Lions Club set about the huge task of erecting a steel staircase and viewing platform to halfway down the gorge. One of the Lions, Lindsay McMillan (son of the above Jim McMillan), designed the steel structure, lookout and platform. All materials were supplied by the Walcha Shire Council and it took the Lions Club members 1,745 hours to complete the job during 1961. The Lions were internationally, and justly, recognised for their tremendous contribution here. The official opening of the scenic stairway was on 14 October 1961 by the state member for Armidale, Davis Hughes.

== Features ==
The sheer sided walls of the upper Apsley Gorge are largely caused by the slate in this area which splits vertically.

The gorge rim supports a vegetation of forest and woodland with a limited understorey of shrubby plants. Common plants include a number of wattles, Acacia amoena (boomerang wattle), Acacia dealbata (silver wattle), Acacia filicifolia (fern-leaved wattle), plus tea trees, Eucalyptus caliginosa (broad-leaved stringy barks), Eucalyptus viminalis (ribbon gums), Eucalyptus nicholii (narrow leaved peppermint), forest red gum, Eucalyptus melliodora (yellow box), Dipodium punctatum (hyacinth orchids), Hakea fraseri (gorge hakea), Jacksonia scoparia (dogwood or native broom) and daisy bush.

Wedge-tailed eagles may be seen soaring on the thermals in the area. Kangaroos, crimson rosellas, echidnas also known as "spiny anteaters" and wallabies frequent the area.

== Facilities ==
Since the NSW National Parks & Wildlife Service took over they have constructed additional lookouts and walkways to view and photograph this magnificent gorge and the two falls. There are several short walks that can be taken from the car parks and these are highlighted in the information shelter erected in the area near the toilet facilities.

The main falls and gorge can be easily viewed from a lookout accessible from the main carpark.

in addition the Oxley Walk is a 2.7 km, 1 1/2 hours walk on a sealed walkway, which crosses the river via a footbridge, then continues around the northern side of the gorge. A further lookout offers fine views of the main falls (650 m) and the track continues past another three lookouts, where one can view a second waterfall and the dramatic cliffs of the chasm. This bridge was washed away in a flood on 28 December 2009, but the replacement was opened in June 2012.

Good facilities are available for caravan or tent campers, including fire wood, toilets, interpretive information, hardened walking tracks, access for disabled people, ten viewing platforms, Aboriginal history, flora and fauna. A small camping fee applies. Dogs and other domestic pets are not allowed.

== See also ==
- List of waterfalls
- List of waterfalls in Australia
