= Round Mountain (Northern Tablelands) =

Mountain in New South Wales, Australia

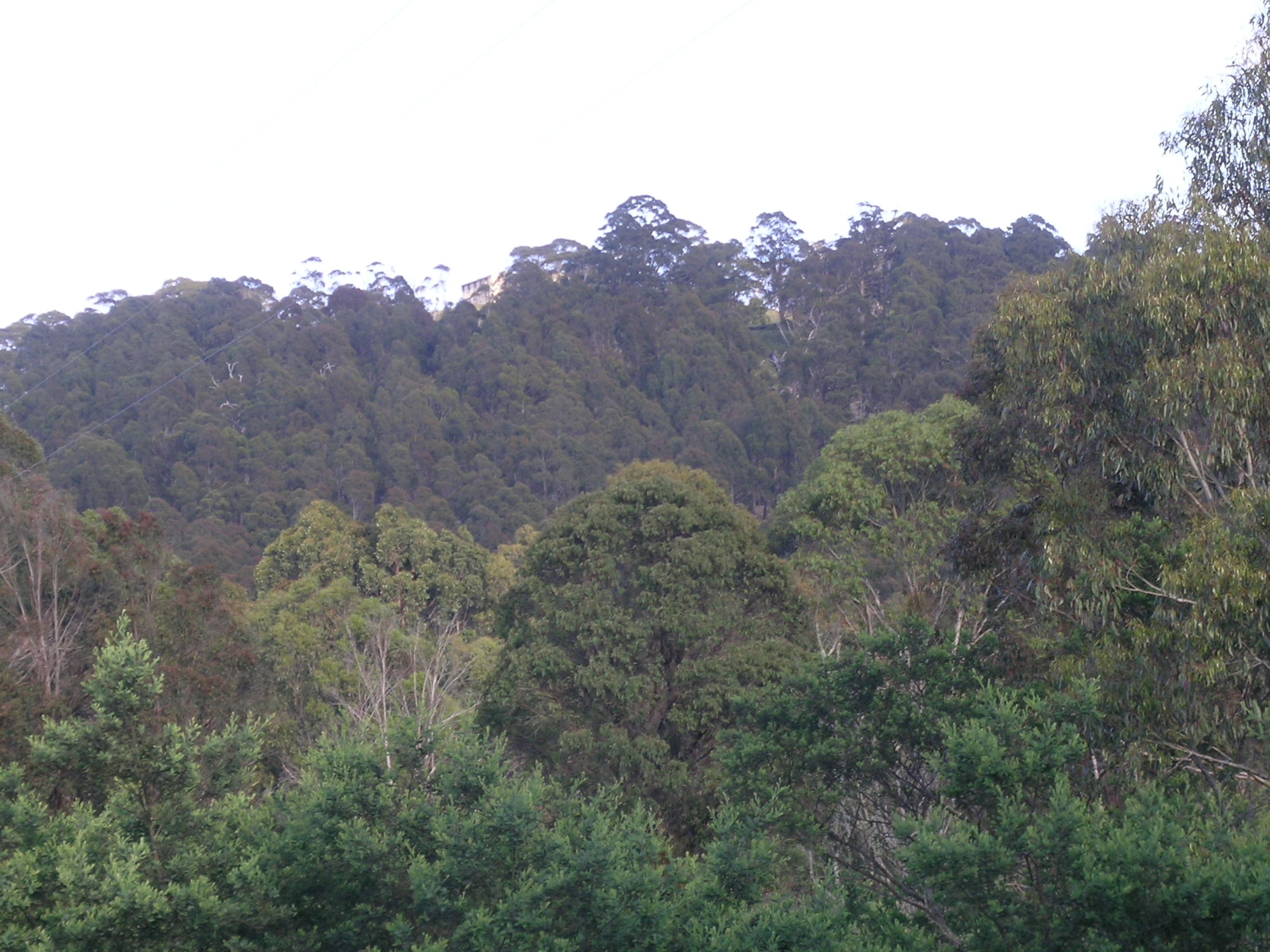
- Radar station, Round Mountain

Highest point
- Elevation: 1,586 m (5,203 ft)
- Coordinates: 30°26′30″S 152°14′00″E

Geography
- Location within New South Wales
- Location: Northern Tablelands, New South Wales, Australia
- Parent range: Snowy Range (in Northern NSW), Great Dividing Range
- Topo map: Maiden Creek

Round Mountain, a mountain of the Snowy Range, a spur of the Great Dividing Range, is located on the Northern Tablelands in the New England region in New South Wales, Australia.

With an elevation of 1,586 metres (5,203 ft) above sea level, Round Mountain is the highest peak of the Snowy Range which forms part of the eastern escarpment of the Northern Tablelands. The mountain is located in Cathedral Rock National Park, about 72 kilometres (45 mi) east of Armidale and 63 kilometres (39 mi) west of Dorrigo, and 10 kilometres (6.2 mi) northwest of the better known Point Lookout, in New England National Park. It is located a few kilometres west of the small settlement of Ebor. The nearest sealed road is the Waterfall Way, approximately 6.5 kilometres (4.0 mi) from the mountain peak.

== Description ==
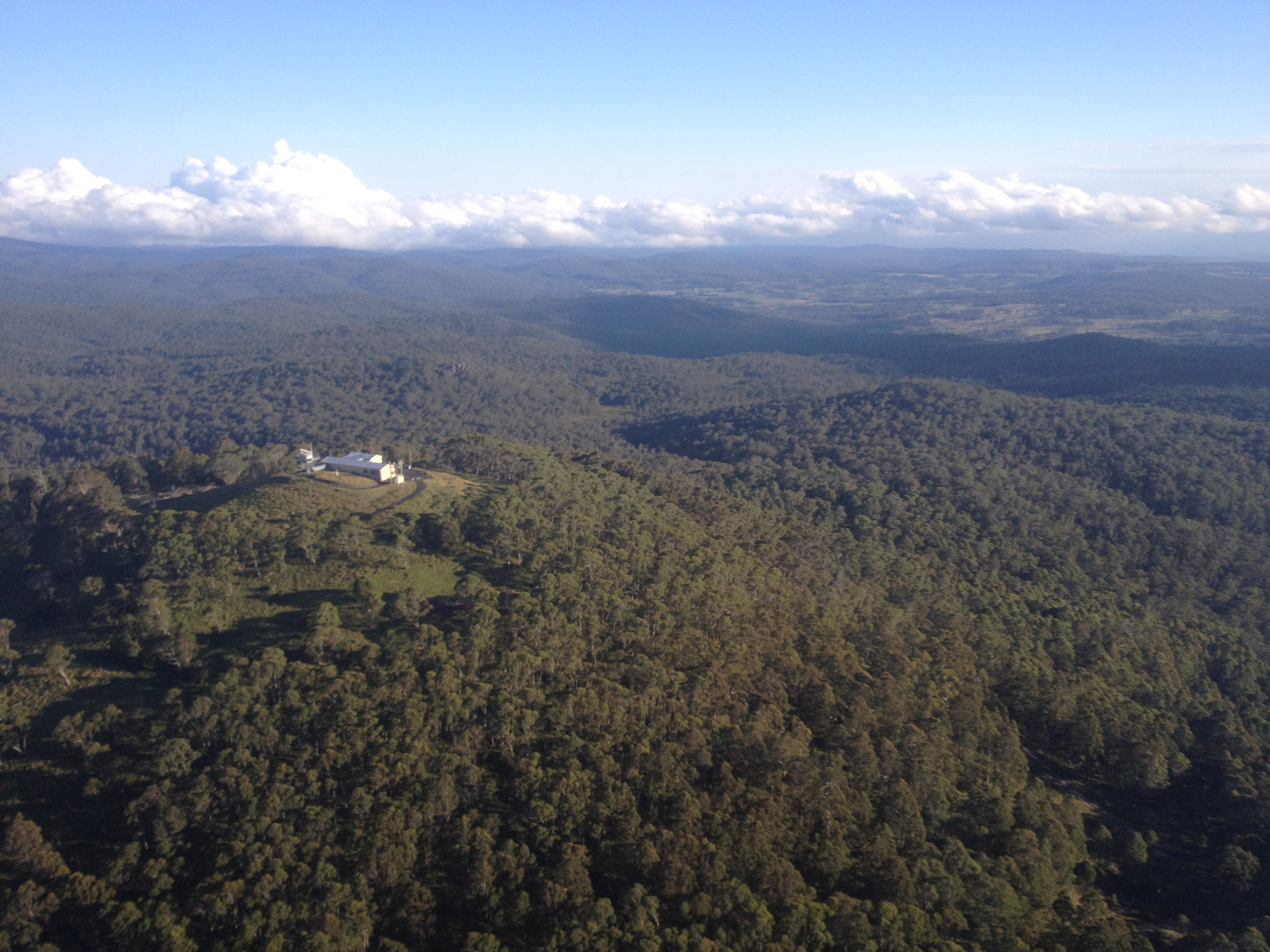
Round Mountain Radar Station, from the air

The northern slopes of Round Mountain are drained by the Guy Fawkes River which flows over the Ebor Falls and eventually goes into the Clarence River. The south slopes of Round Mountain are drained by the Styx River which flows to the Macleay River and the Oaky River which drains into the Chandler River.

A radar air navigation station, for the control and guidance of aircraft, is located on the summit of Round Mountain.

== See also ==
- List of mountains in Australia § New South Wales
