= Oaky River =

Coordinates: 30°40′S 152°01′E

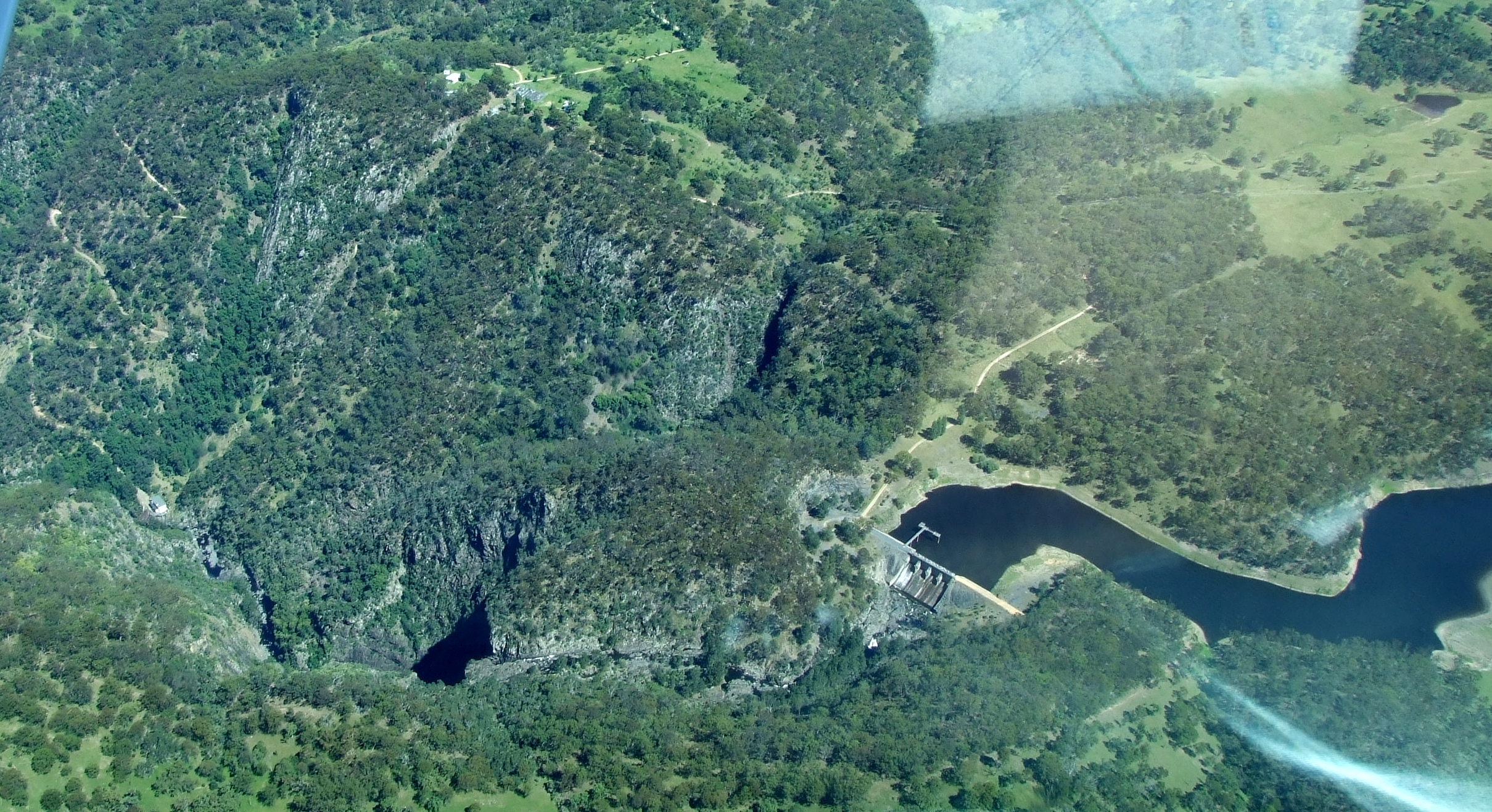
- Oaky River Dam and gorge

Location
- Country: Australia
- State: New South Wales
- IBRA: New England Tablelands
- District: Northern Tablelands
- local government area: Armidale Dumaresq

Physical characteristics
- Source: Round Mountain, Sonwy Range, Great Dividing Range
  - location: below Point Lookout, near Ebor
  - elevation: 1,400 m (4,600 ft)
- Mouth: confluence with the Chandler River
  - location: near Jeogla
  - elevation: 277 m (909 ft)
- Length: 60 km (37 mi)

Basin features
- River system: Macleay River catchment
- Tributaries
  - right: Ponds Creek
- National park: Cathedral Rock NP, New England NP

Oaky River, a perennial stream of the Macleay River catchment, is located in the Northern Tablelands district of New South Wales, Australia.

== Course and features ==
Oaky River rises on the southern slopes of Round Mountain, the highest peak of the Snowy Range, a spur of the Great Dividing Range south southwest of Ebor, and flows generally southwest, joined by one minor tributary before reaching its confluence with the Chandler River, southwest of Jeogla. The river descends 881 metres (2,890 ft) over its 51 kilometres (32 mi) course; rapidly descending into a deep gorge where it meets the Chandler River.

The upper reaches of Oaky River are transversed by the Waterfall Way between Wollomombi and Ebor.

Oaky River and its tributaries are trout streams and platypus may be sighted in the waters.

== Reservoir & Hydroelectric Power Station ==
The river is impounded by Oaky River Dam, located approximately 40 kilometres (25 mi) from Armidale. At capacity, the dam covers around 42 hectares (100 acres) and holds 2,780 megalitres (98×10^{6} cu ft) of water. A hydroelectric power station is located at the dam and the flow of water is used to generate electricity. The power station has five turbines that generate 12 megawatts (16,000 hp). Zihni Buzo, an Albanian migrant and Harvard-educated civil engineer was the leading engineer on the construction of the dam and hydroelectric scheme. This dam burst in February 2013 and is no longer viable.

== See also ==
- List of rivers of Australia
- Rivers of New South Wales
