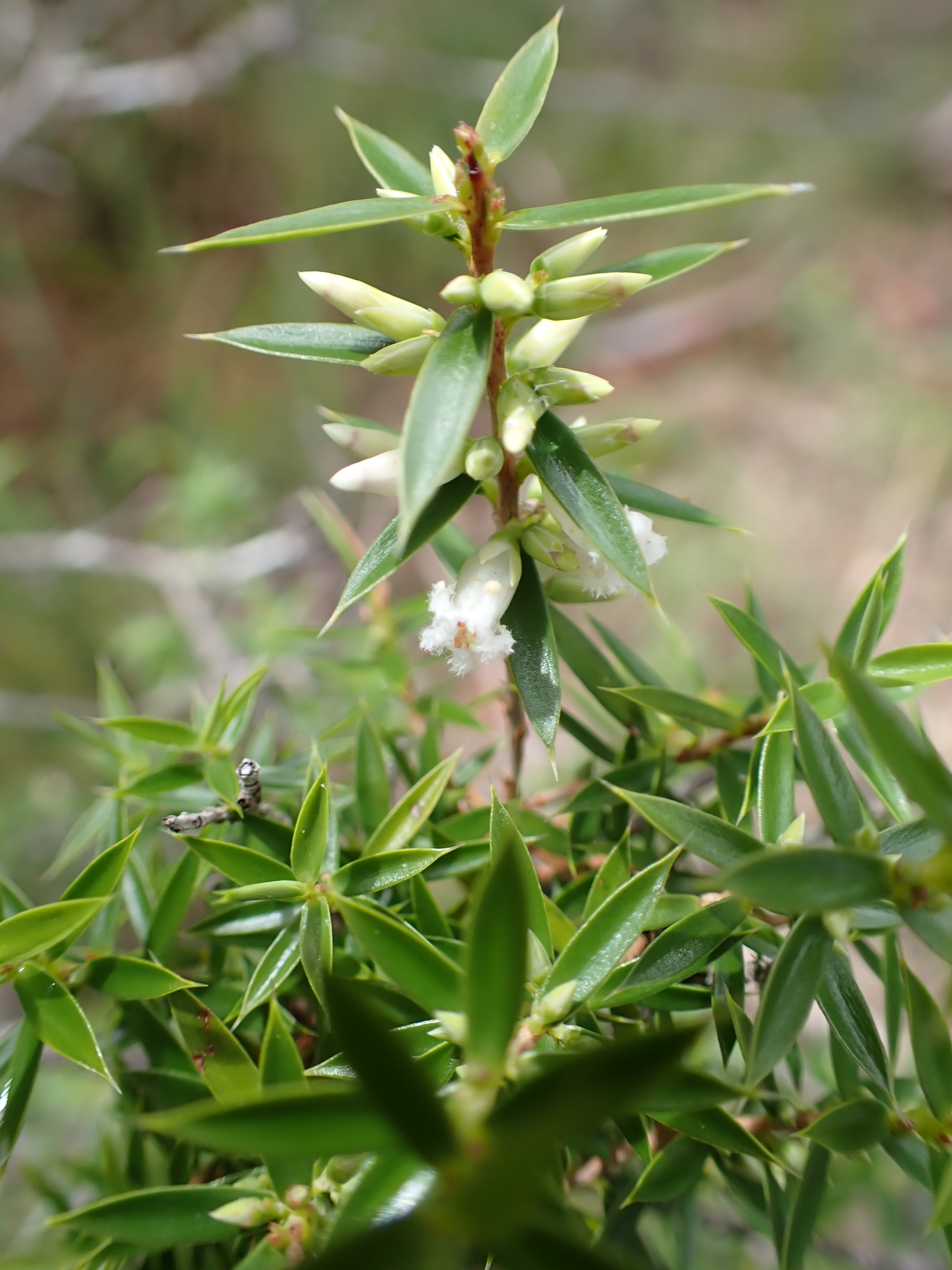

Scientific classification
- Kingdom: Plantae
- Clade: Tracheophytes
- Clade: Angiosperms
- Clade: Eudicots
- Clade: Asterids
- Order: Ericales
- Family: Ericaceae
- Genus: Styphelia
- Species: S. trichostyla

Binomial name
- Styphelia trichostyla (J.M.Powell) Hislop, Crayn & Puente-Lel.

Synonyms
- Leucopogon trichostylus J.M.Powell

= Styphelia trichostyla =

Species of shrub

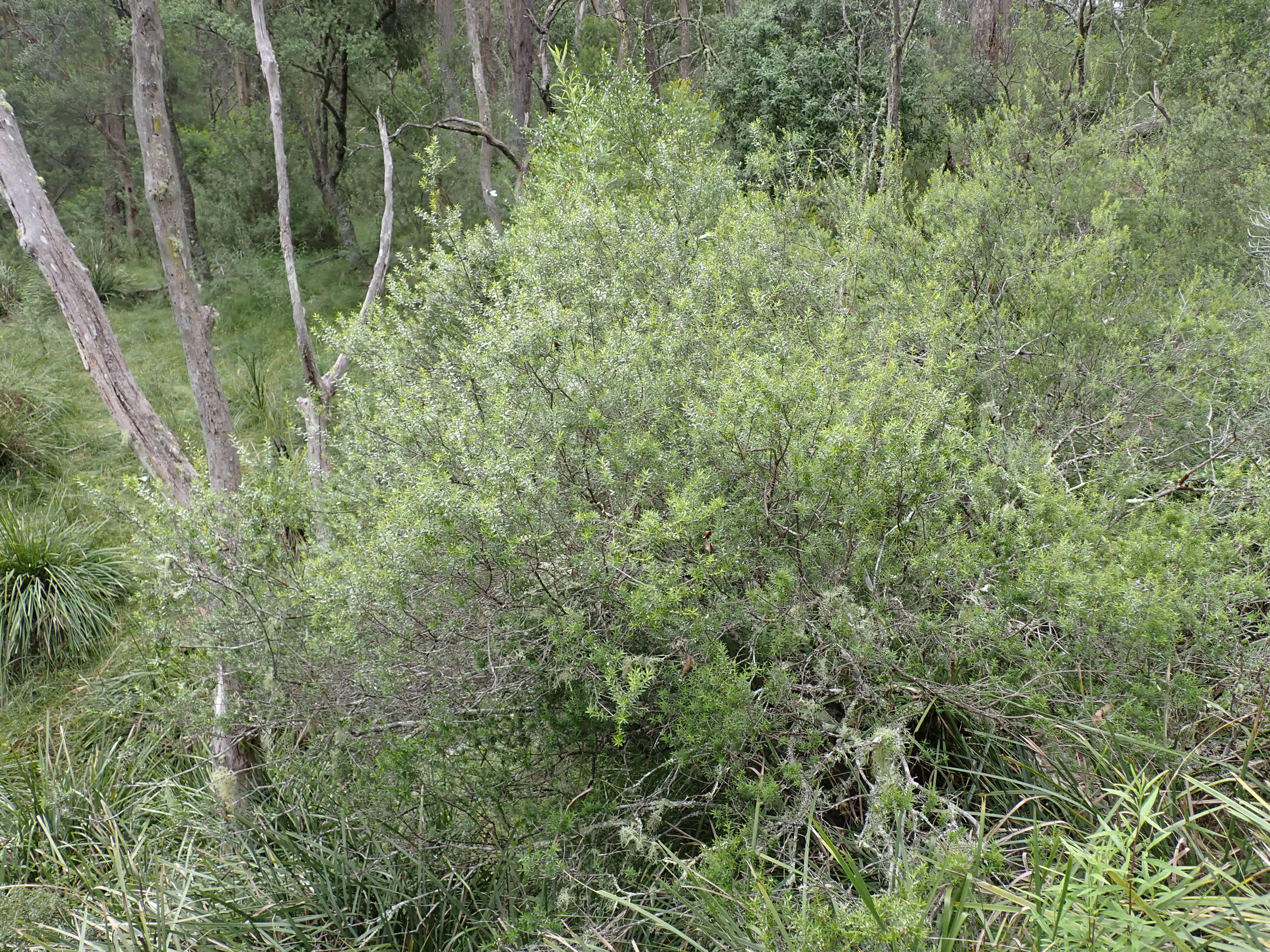
Habit near Wollomombi Falls

Styphelia trichostyla, commonly known as daphne heath, is a species of flowering plant in the heath family Ericaceae, and is endemic to eastern Australia. It is an erect to spreading shrub with elliptic to egg-shaped leaves, and white, tube-shaped flowers arranged singly or in groups of up to three in leaf axils.

== Description ==
Styphelia trichostyla is an erect to spreading shrub that typically grows to a height of 1.0–1.5 m (3 ft 3 in – 4 ft 11 in). Its leaves are elliptic to more or less egg-shaped with the narrower end towards the base, 8.4–14 mm (0.33–0.55 in) long and 2.1–3.7 mm (0.083–0.146 in) wide on a petiole 0.8–1.2 mm (0.031–0.047 in) long. Both sides of the leaves are glabrous, the lower surface with more or less parallel veins. The flowers are borne singly or in groups of up to three in leaf axils, with bracteoles 1.2–2.8 mm (0.047–0.110 in) long at the base. The sepals are 2.7–4.8 mm (0.11–0.19 in) long, the petals white and joined at the base, forming a tube 3–6 mm (0.12–0.24 in) long, the lobes 2.7–4.6 mm (0.11–0.18 in) long and sparsely bearded on the inside. Flowering occurs from April to June and in September and October, and the fruit is an elliptic drupe 3.5–4.2 mm (0.14–0.17 in) long and glabrous.

== Taxonomy ==
This species was first formally described in 1993 by Jocelyn Marie Powell who gave it the name Leucopogon trichostylus in the journal Telopea from specimens collected by John Beaumont Williams, near Armidale in 1984. In 2020, Michael Hislop, Darren Crayn and Caroline Puente-Lelievre transferred the species to Styphelia as S. trichostyla in Australian Systematic Botany. The specific epithet (trichostyla) means "small hair-bearing", referring to the hairy lower half of the style.

== Distribution and habitat ==
Styphelia trichostyla grows on rocky outcrops or on cliff edges, sometimes in forest, and is found on the Darling Downs, Moreton and Burnett districts of Queensland and on the North Coast and Northern Tablelands of New South Wales.
