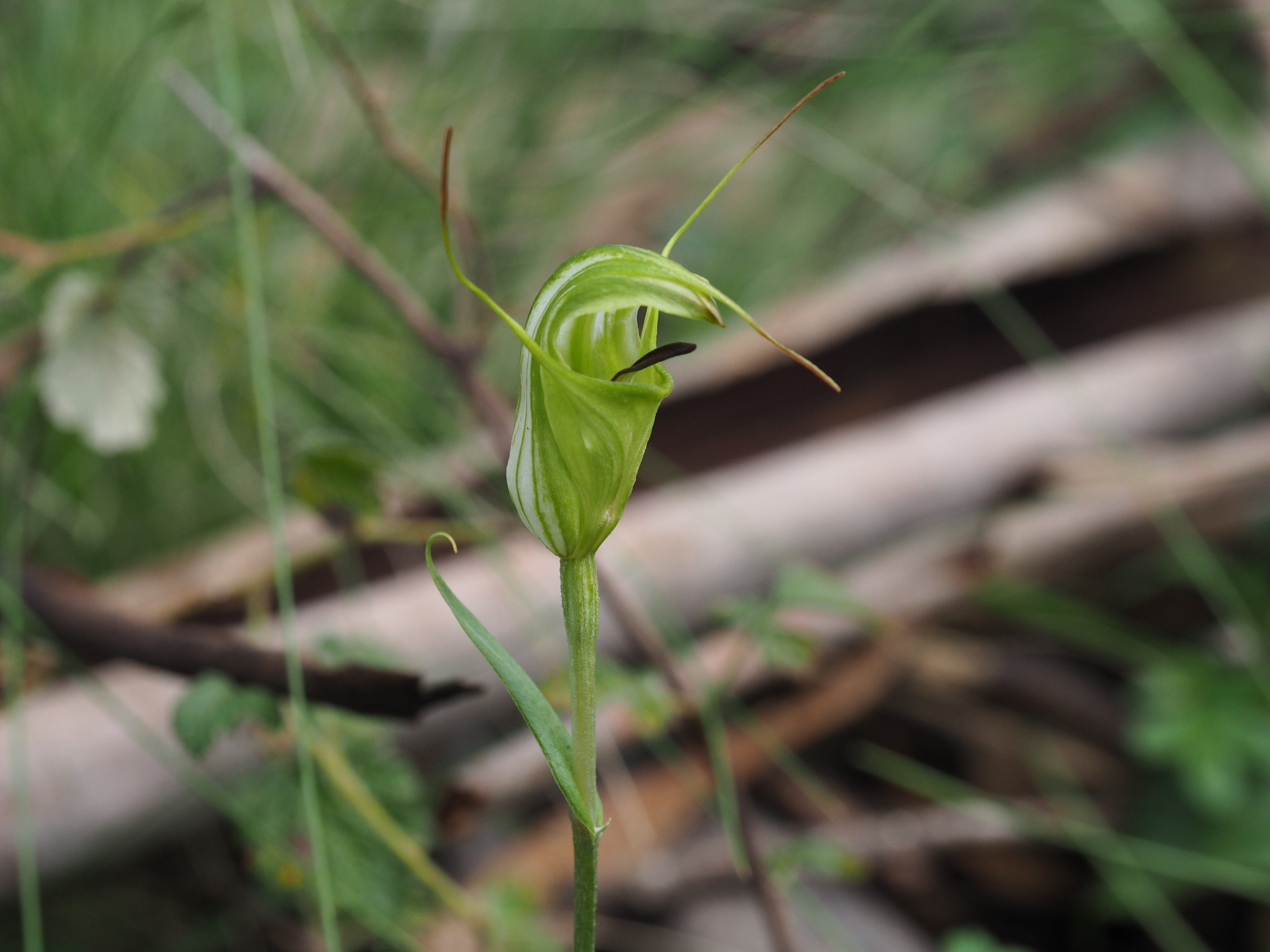
- Pterostylis metcalfei near Ebor

Scientific classification
- Kingdom: Plantae
- Clade: Tracheophytes
- Clade: Angiosperms
- Clade: Monocots
- Order: Asparagales
- Family: Orchidaceae
- Subfamily: Orchidoideae
- Tribe: Cranichideae
- Genus: Pterostylis
- Species: P. metcalfei

Binomial name
- Pterostylis metcalfei D.L.Jones

Synonyms
- Diplodium metcalfei (D.L.Jones) D.L.Jones & M.A.Clem.; Pterostylis metcaffei J.J.Riley orth. var.

= Pterostylis metcalfei =

Metcalfe's greenhood

Species of orchid

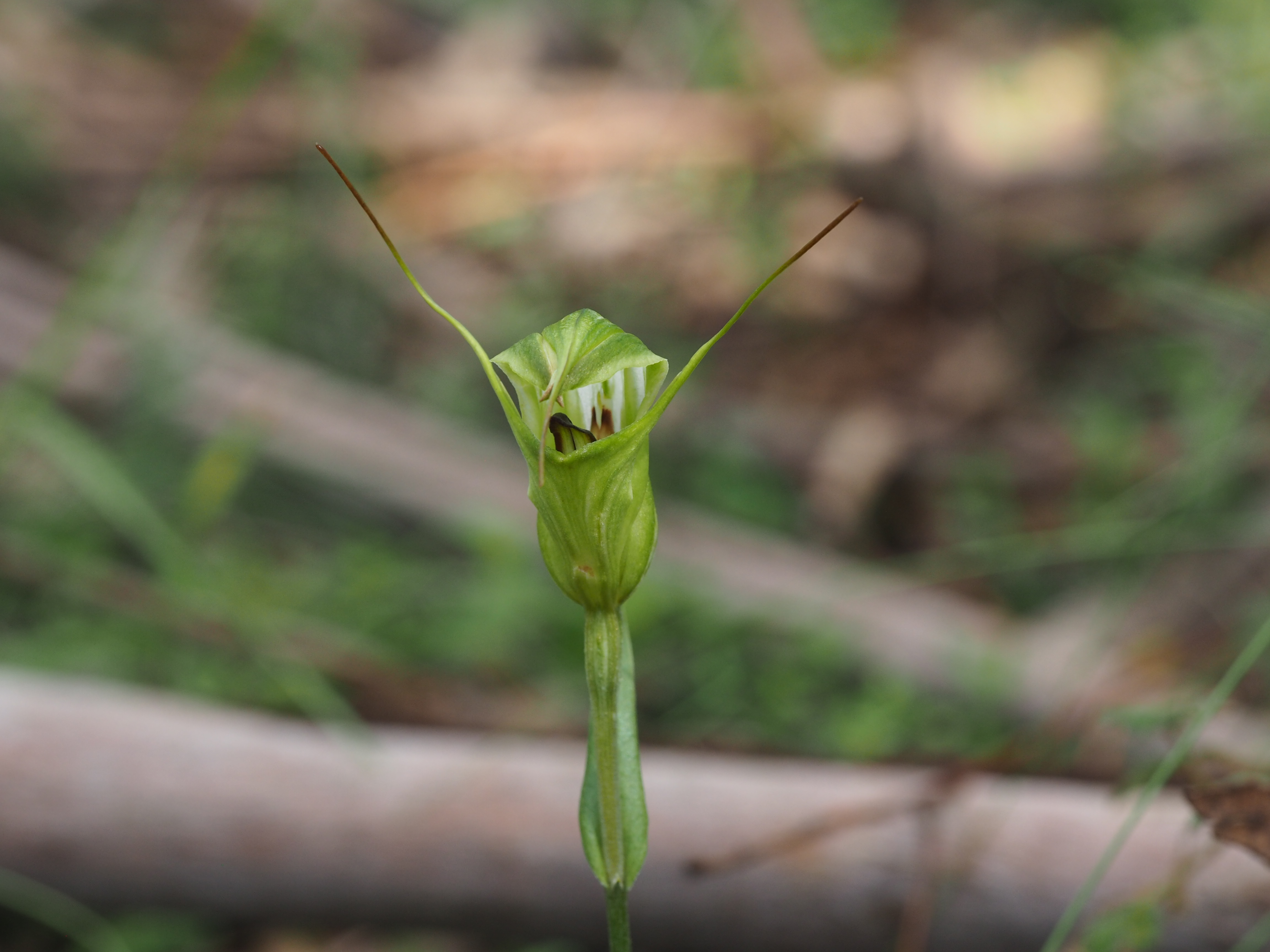
Front view

Pterostylis metcalfei, commonly known as Metcalfe's greenhood, or Ebor greenhood is a species of orchid that is endemic to the Northern Tablelands of New South Wales. As with similar greenhoods, the flowering plants differ from those which are not flowering. The non-flowering plants have a rosette of leaves flat on the ground but the flowering plants have a single flower with leaves on the flowering spike. This greenhood has a dark green and white striped flower and is known from only three locations. It is listed as an endangered species.

== Description ==
Pterostylis metcalfei has a rosette of 3 to 5 leaves, each leaf 7–30 mm (0.3–1 in) long, 7–20 mm (0.3–0.8 in) wide, dark green and flat. The flower stem is 10–30 cm (4–10 in)1 long and bears a single flower 23–28 mm (0.9–1 in) long and 9–11 mm (0.35–0.43 in) wide and shiny, greenish-white with darker green stripes. The dorsal sepal is erect at its base but then arches forward, forming a hood over the labellum and has a threadlike tip, 7–14 mm (0.3–0.6 in) long. The labellum is blunt, sharply kinked in the middle and is 13.5–17 mm (0.53–0.67 in) long and about 3 mm (0.1 in) wide. Flowering occurs from March to May.

== Taxonomy and naming ==
Pterostylis metcalfei was first formally described by David L. Jones in 1997 from a specimen collected by Peter Metcalfe on Doughboy Mountain, about 10 km (6 mi) south of Wongwibindi station, on the road to Wollomombi, on 8 May 1994. The description was published in The Orchadian. In 2002, Jones and Clements transferred the species to the genus Diplodium but the move has not been accepted by the Australian Plant Census nor by Plants of the World Online. The specific epithet (metcalfei) honours the collector of the type specimens, Peter Metcalfe.

== Distribution and habitat ==
The species is endemic to the New England Tablelands bioregion at altitudes of 1,000 to 1,350 m (3,000 to 4,000 ft). It is found on ridges and slopes with well drained soil derived from granite and basalt, growing among grass and shrubs. It is known from only three locations, only one of which is in a national park, so that it is threatened by cattle grazing and trampling.

== Conservation status ==
The Scientific Committee of the Office of Environment and Heritage, established by the Threatened Species Conservation Act, has listed P. metcalfei as "endangered" under the New South Wales Government Biodiversity Conservation Act 2016.
