= Wollomombi River =

Coordinates: 30°25′S 151°57′E

Wollomombi River Woolomombi Creek, Rockvale Creek
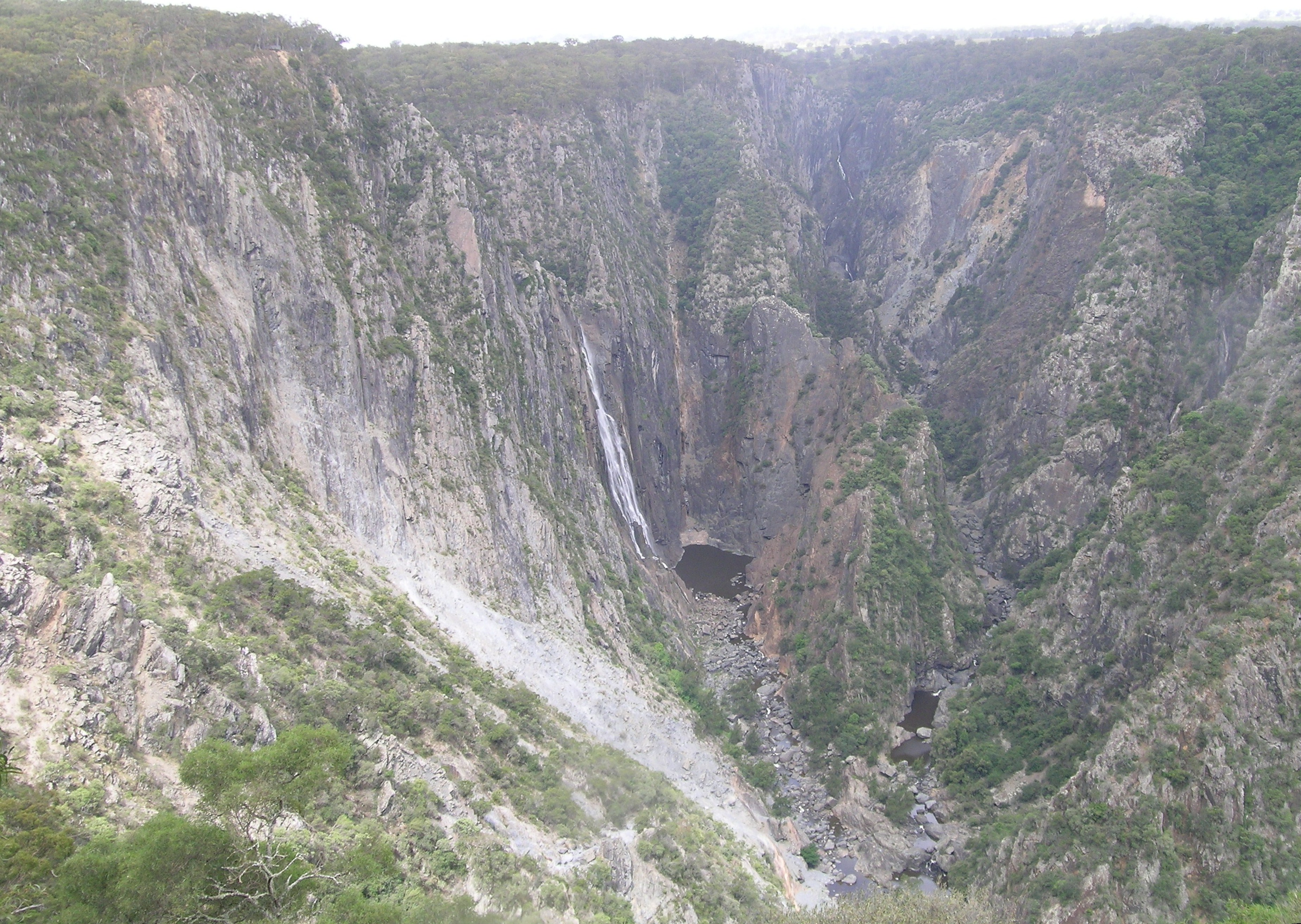
- Wollomombi River (left) showing the river's confluence with the Chandler River in Oxley Wild Rivers National Park.

Location
- Country: Australia
- State: New South Wales
- IBRA: New England Tablelands
- District: Northern Tablelands
- Local government area: Armidale Dumaresq

Physical characteristics
- Source: Great Dividing Range
  - location: southeast of Guyra
  - elevation: 1,280 m (4,200 ft)
- Mouth: confluence with the Chandler River
  - location: ear the village of Wollomombi
  - elevation: 677 m (2,221 ft)
- Length: 65 km (40 mi)

Basin features
- River system: Macleay River catchment
- Tributaries
  - left: Boundary Creek (New South Wales)
- Waterfalls: Wollomombi Falls

Wollomombi River, a perennial stream of the Macleay River catchment, is located in the Northern Tablelands district of New South Wales, Australia.

== Course and features ==
Wollomombi River rises on the eastern slopes of Chandlers Peak in the Great Dividing Range, southeast of Guyra, and flows generally southerly, joined by one minor tributary and tumbling over the Wollomombi Falls before reaching its confluence with the Chandler River, near the village of Wollomombi, south of the Cunnawarra National Park, within the Oxley Wild Rivers National Park. The river descends 606 metres (1,988 ft) over its 65 kilometres (40 mi) course; through a number of spectacular gorges and waterfalls in the Oxley Wild Rivers National Park.

At the Wollomombi Falls lookout there are scenic gorge rim walks and a steep track that takes you down to the Chandler River.

== History ==
In December 1904 two teenagers were drowned while bathing in the Wollomombi River. Another lady almost drowned while attempting to rescue them.

Beef cattle and sheep are reared on the upper reaches of the river.

== See also ==
- List of rivers of Australia
- Rivers of New South Wales
