= Styx River (New South Wales) =

Coordinates: 30°36′S 152°08′E

Location
- Country: Australia
- State: New South Wales
- IBRA: New England Tablelands
- District: Northern Tablelands
- local government area: Armidale

Physical characteristics
- Source: Great Dividing Range
  - location: below Point Lookout, near Ebor
  - elevation: 1,400 m (4,600 ft)
- Mouth: confluence with the Chandler River
  - location: near Jeogla
  - elevation: 277 m (909 ft)
- Length: 60 km (37 mi)

Basin features
- River system: Macleay River catchment
- Tributaries
  - right: Serpentine Creek, Jeogla Creek
- National park: New England NP, Oxley Wild Rivers NP

Styx River, a perennial stream of the Macleay River catchment, is located in the Northern Tablelands district of New South Wales, Australia.

== Course and features ==
The Styx River starts below Point Lookout in the Great Dividing Range along the eastern escarpment of the Northern Tablelands, south southeast of Ebor, and flows generally southwest, joined by two minor tributaries before reaching its confluence with the Chandler River, south southwest of Jeogla. The river descends 1,120 metres (3,670 ft) over its 60 kilometres (37 mi) course; rapidly descending into a deep gorge where it meets the Chandler River.

== See also ==
- List of rivers of Australia
