= Chandler River (New South Wales) =

Coordinates: 30°37′S 152°00′E

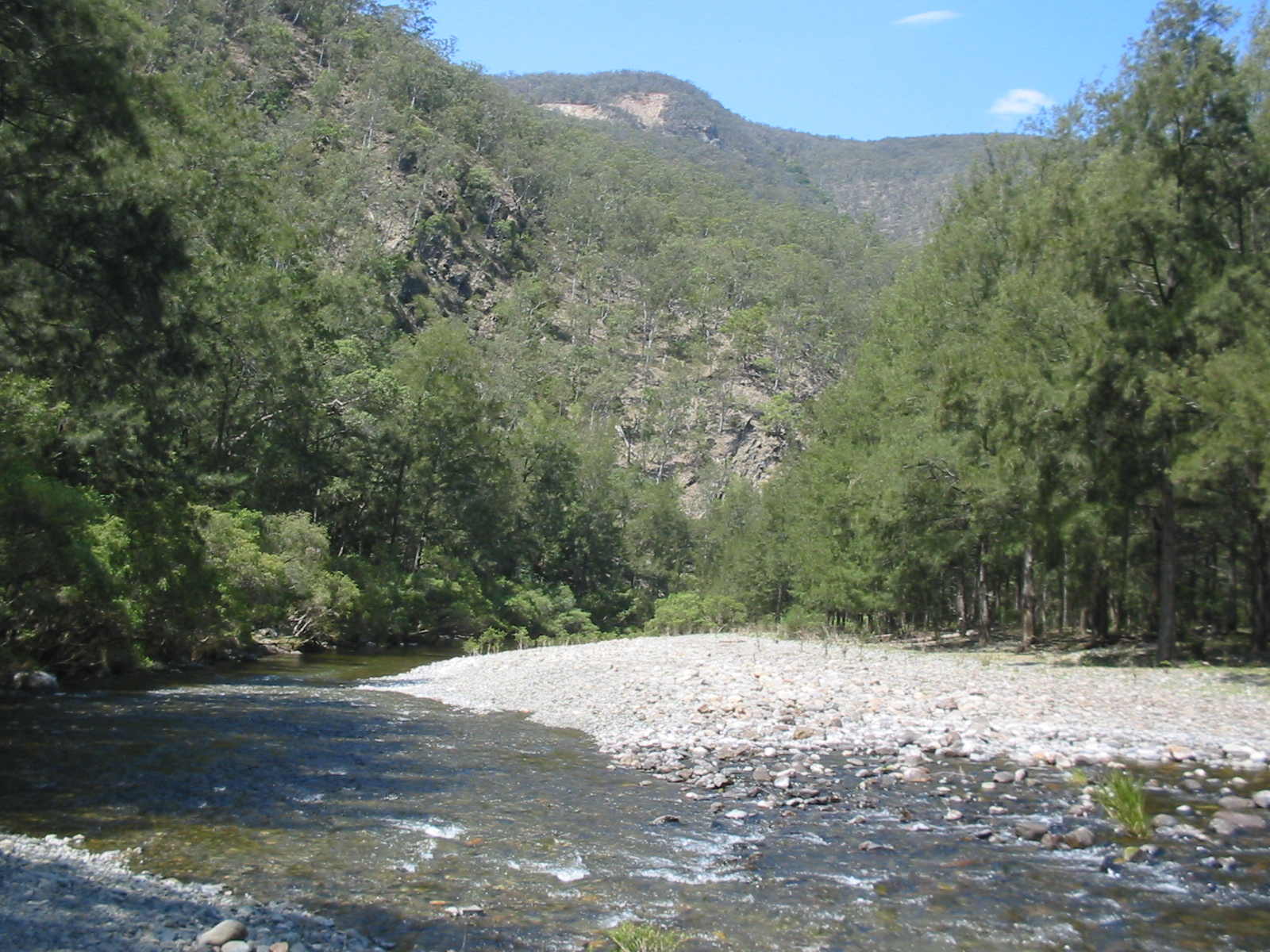
- Halls Peak Mine and the Chandler River in Oxley Wild Rivers National Park
- Etymology: named by Captain Dumaresq in honour of one of his stockmen

Location
- Country: Australia
- State: New South Wales
- Region: New England Tablelands (IBRA), Northern Tablelands
- Local government area: Armidale Dumaresq

Physical characteristics
- Source: Great Dividing Range
  - location: northeast of Armidale and southeast of Guyra
  - elevation: 1,260 m (4,130 ft)
- Mouth: confluence with the Macleay River
  - location: below Table Top Mountain, within Cunnawarra National Park
  - elevation: 210 m (690 ft)
- Length: 110 km (68 mi)

Basin features
- River system: Macleay River catchment
- Tributaries
  - left: Chandalina Creek, Maiden Creek (New South Wales), Station Creek (New South Wales), Oaky River, Styx River
  - right: Wollomombi River
- Waterfall: Chandler Falls

Chandler River, a perennial stream of the Macleay River catchment, is located in the Northern Tablelands district of New South Wales, Australia.

== Course and features ==
Chandler River rises on the eastern slopes of the Great Dividing Range, northeast of Armidale and southeast of Guyra, and flows generally southerly, joined by six tributaries including the Wollomombi, Oaky, and Styx rivers, before reaching its confluence with the Macleay River, south of the Cunnawarra National Park, below Table Top Mountain within the Oxley Wild Rivers National Park. The river descends 1,050 metres (3,440 ft) over its 111 kilometres (69 mi) course.

Within both the Cunnawarra and Oxley Wild Rivers national parks, the Chandler River passes through a number of spectacular gorges and waterfalls, including the Chandler Falls. Although not on the Chandler River, the Wollomombi Falls is located just east of the Chandler River, shortly before its confluence with the Wollomombi River. At the Wollomombi Falls lookout there are scenic gorge rim walks and a steep walking-track that descends into the Chandler River valley floor.

Elsewhere, Halls Peak camping area is situated on the banks of the Chandler River and caters for self-reliant visitors looking to experience the seclusion of remote camping in a rural setting. The trail to the camp site is very steep, descending almost 700 metres (2,300 ft). Steep sides of the trail do not have safety protection barriers. The NSW National Parks & Wildlife Service (NPWS) recommends, as a minimum, the use of high clearance low-range 4WD vehicles with a skilled experienced driver. A fee is payable and a key must be obtained at the Armidale office of the NPWS.

Chandler River is transversed by the Waterfall Way near Wollomombi.

Chandler River was named by Captain Dumaresq in honour of one of his stockmen

On the upper reaches of the river beef cattle graze; while brumbies roam the lower reaches of the river.

== See also ==
- Wollomombi Falls
- List of rivers of Australia
- Rivers of New South Wales
