= Wollomombi, New South Wales =

Coordinates: 30°31′S 152°03′E

Wollomombi
- Town
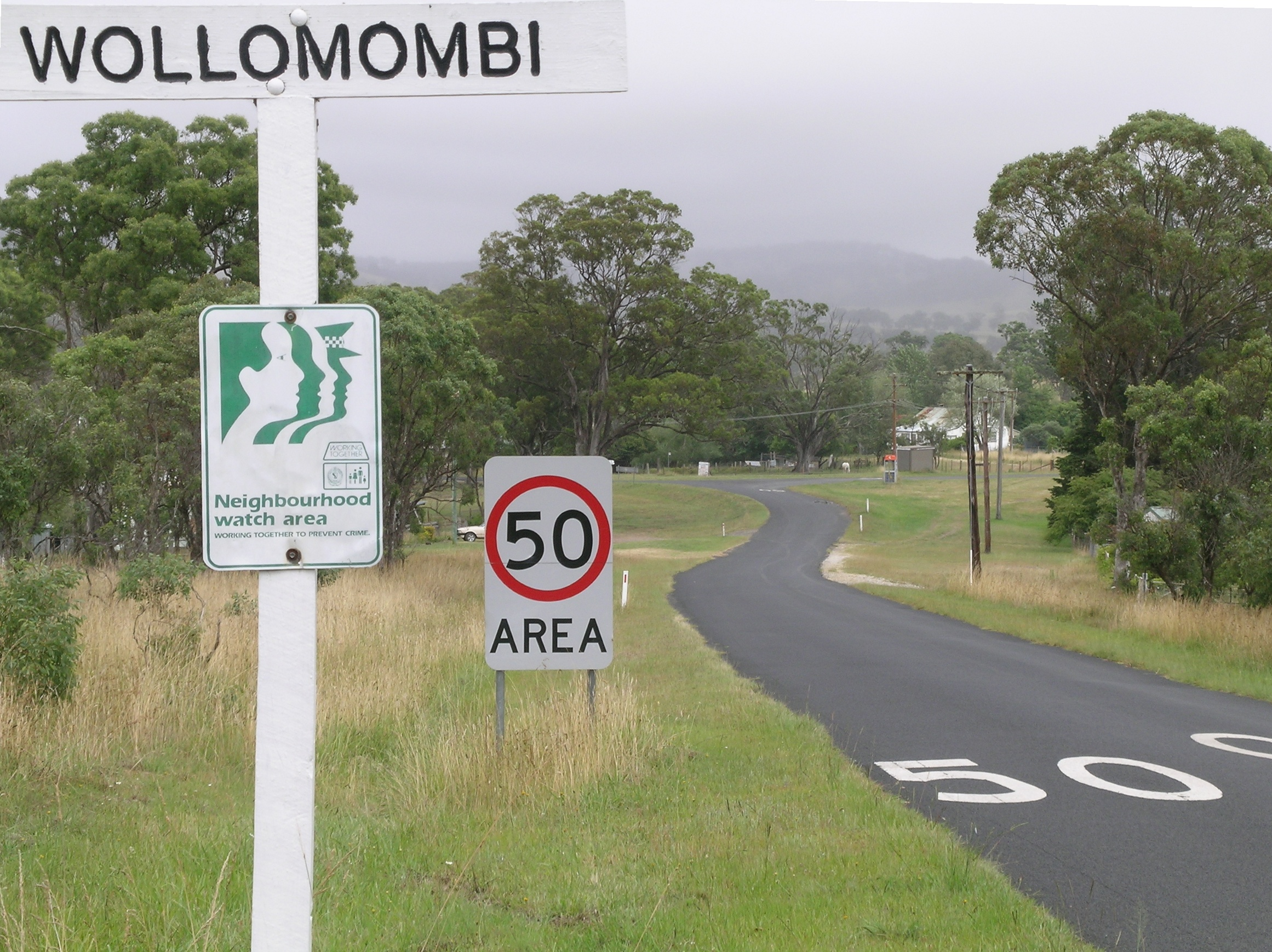
- Wollomombi
- Country: Australia
- State: New South Wales
- LGA: Armidale Regional Council
- Location: 525 km (326 mi) N of Sydney; 38 km (24 mi) E of Armidale

Government
  - State electorate: Northern Tablelands
  - Federal division: New England
- Elevation: 964 m (3,163 ft)

Population
  - Total: 112 (2016 census)
- Postcode: 2350
- County: Clarke
- Parish: Chandler
- Mean max temp: 19.8 °C (67.6 °F)
- Mean min temp: 7.5 °C (45.5 °F)
- Annual rainfall: 820 mm (32 in)

Wollomombi is a small village situated 1 km north of Waterfall Way and approximately 38 kilometres east of Armidale, New South Wales, Australia. The settlement is at an altitude of about 964 metres on the Northern Tablelands in the New England region.

The village is centered between the Wollomombi River and Chandler River. These rivers fall into the Wollomombi Gorge about 4 km away at a site known as the Wollomombi Falls, which is in Oxley Wild Rivers National Park.

Wollomombi's population was 299 in the 1961 Census, fell to 148 in the 2006 Census and to 119 in the 2021 Census.

The village of Wollomombi comprises a general store, several houses, sports ground and a community hall. St John's Presbyterian Church, an original timber building, still stands in the village.

The dominant industry in the area is livestock grazing along with an expanding tourism industry.

The Chandler Public School is a small school of 11 pupils that serves as Wollomombi's school. This school is situated on the southern side of Waterfall Way, about 1.5 km from the village.

The village once held an annual rodeo in March, along with an annual Wood Expo in October. However, in recent years, these events have no longer recurred.

== History ==
Wollomombi Post Office opened on 1 August 1879.

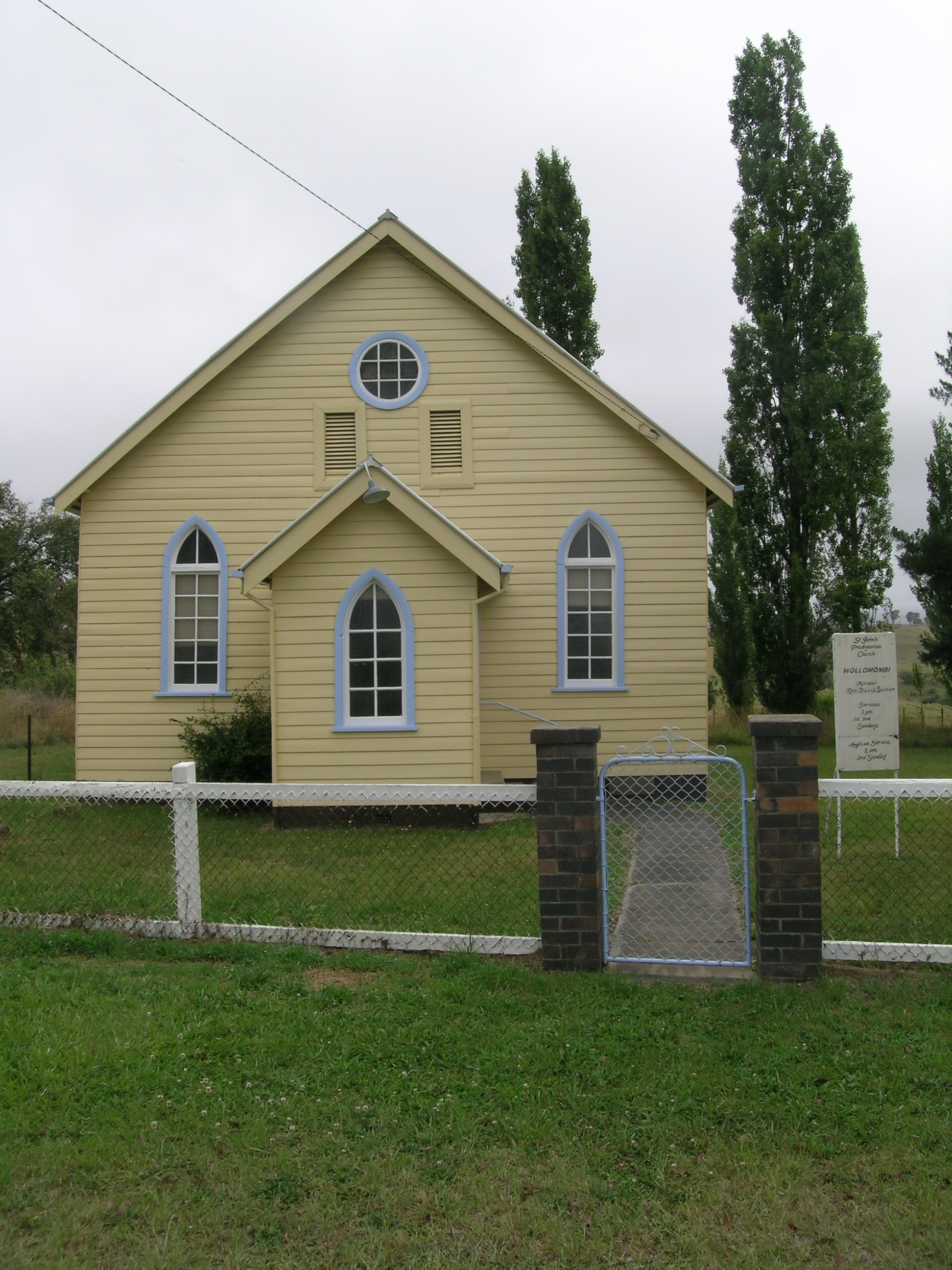
St John's Church
