= Kunderang East Pastoral Station =

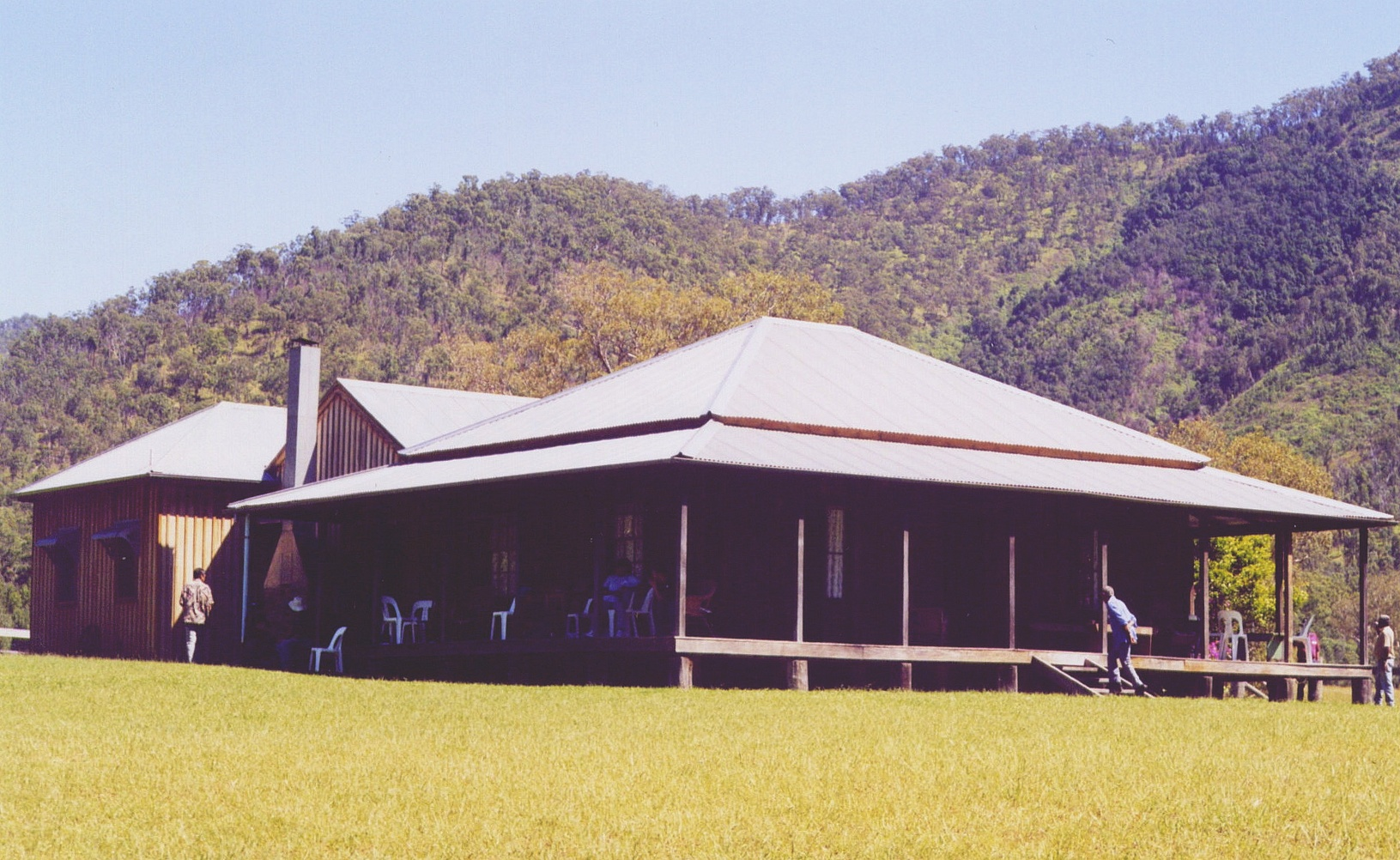
- Homestead at East Kunderang pastoral station, circa 2001

- Location within New South Wales Location within Australia
- 30.9036°S 152.1596°E
- Location: 80km north-west Oxley Wild Rivers National Park, Jeogla, Armidale Regional Council, New South Wales, Australia

History
- Built: 1892–1893

Site notes
- Owner: Office of Environment and Heritage

New South Wales Heritage Register
- Official name: Kunderang East Pastoral Station; Cunderang / Kunderang station (fmr.); Apsley Gorges
- Type: state heritage (landscape)
- Designated: 2 April 1999
- Reference no.: 996
- Type: Farm
- Category: Farming and Grazing
- Builders: Joe Small

Kunderang East Pastoral Station is a heritage-listed former pastoral station at Jeogla, Armidale Regional Council, New South Wales, Australia. It was built from 1892 to 1893 by Joe Small. It is also known as Cunderang / Kunderang station or Apsley Gorges. The property is owned by the Office of Environment and Heritage (State Government). It was added to the New South Wales State Heritage Register on 2 April 1999.

== History ==
Kunderang East Pastoral Station is located at the eastern edge of the Great Dividing Range near the headwaters of the Manning, Hasting and Macleay Rivers. The land was originally occupied by Aboriginal tribes including the Birpai, Ngaku and the large Thungutti tribe. It seems that the station took its name from a clan of the Thungutti who occupied this area.

European invasion came from the fertile tablelands and coastal strip in the 1820s. Cunderang Station was established by Captain George Jobling by 1843, possibly as an outpost for Toorookoo, Jobling's first grant. During this early period a number of Aboriginal massacres occurred on the Kunderang run, while Aboriginal people were staging a resistance to the invasion of their land.

Jobling sold his interest in the cattle run in 1854 and between then and 1889, several non-resident owners increased its size to 90,000 acres.

In 1889 Joe Fitzgerald and Alec McDonell from Cundletown, near Taree, purchased sections of the Kunderang Run, with the remainder staying with the Crawfords and becoming Kunderang West. At that point Kunderang East Station was established.

The existing Kunderang East pastoral station homestead was begun in 1890 with the construction of a three roomed vertical timber plank (locally-cut and sawn) building later used as a kitchen. In 1892, a larger four roomed solid cedar vertical plank house was built and the Fitzgerald family moved in. Soon after the gap between the earlier hut and the new house were infilled to form a dining room. The Fitzgeralds lived there until 1928. The experience of living at Kunderang East was profoundly influenced by its isolation. Although the telephone was installed in 1919, a road into the property was not put through until 1967 with electricity following in 1973. This isolation, while limiting the economic viability of the place as a cattle station, created an environment which gave unique aspects to its cultural history.

Between about 1920 and 1969 Kunderang East pastoral station varied in size, but hovered around 100,000 acres as various leases and permissive occupancies were added or forfeited. In addition to the homestead, three remote mustering huts, a restored forge and hayshed and reconstructed set of stockyards comprise the remaining infrastructure within the pastoral station precinct.

From 1928 to 1967, Kunderang East was managed by Alec McDonell. In 1967, Kunderang East was sold to Kellion Estates Pty. Ltd. although McDonell remained as the manager until 1973. Road access to the property was established in 1967, and electricity was installed in 1973. The old kitchen section was demolished and a new one built in the same location around this time. Kellion Estates carried out major works on the property from 1967 to 1989, including replacing the kitchen wing and altering the roofscape between the dining room and kitchen wing.

The property was acquired by the NSW National Parks & Wildlife Service in 1989. Major conservation and restoration works were conducted in the 1990s, restoring the roofscape to its c.1900 form. The Kellion Estates kitchen was demolished and the exterior shell of the kitchen wing substantially reconstructed based on available evidence, with a modern interior. Since acquisition by the NPWS, the homestead has been subject of maintenance works and ongoing assessment of the structures and the historic features in outlying areas of the station.

Although various leases changed, the overall size of Kunderang Station remained largely the same throughout its hundred-year operation.

The old kitchen wing underwent a change of use in 2008, being converted to a large eat-in kitchen after being used as a caretaker's cottage. The homestead is currently rented out as a commercial accommodation facility where customers access it via a four-wheel drive only access road. This adaptive reuse and associated revenue has assisted in offsetting the cost of site management over the last 20 years.

== Description ==
=== Station ===
Kunderang East Pastoral Station forms part of the Oxley Rivers National Park, part of a serial World Heritage Area listing of Gondwana Rainforests. Oxley Rivers NP is one of the largest of the national parks in this listing, particularly important for the extensive areas of dry rainforest that it contains.

Between about 1920 and 1969 Kunderang East pastoral station varied in size, but hovered around 100,000 acres as various leases and permissive occupancies were added or forfeited.

Kunderang Station is located in the middle reaches of the Macleay River Valley between Armidale and Kempsey. Although downstream of the spectacular cliffed Macleay Gorges, it is nevertheless scenically impressive. The most extensive vegetation is open woodland and dry rainforest in the Top Creek catchment of the north side of the river. The vegetation ranges from typically New England plateau species in higher parts to coastal or lowland species along the valleys. Wildlife is abundant in the area. Kunderdang Station Nature Reserve was incorporated into Oxley Wild Rivers National Park in 1989.

Kunderang is representative of an area supporting a diversity in vegetation and scenic gorges. The rugged nature of the topography has left the area in a pristine condition. It marks the eastern border of the New England flora and the western extremity of the coastal vegetation.

The pastoral station remains comprise a cleared area west of the Macleay River and otherwise surrounded by forest. Fences skirt the clearing and frame paddocks and the central homestead complex.

Edward Fitzgerald's grave is on the station south of the homestead complex. The possible site of Jack Crawford's hut is nearby to this grave.

=== Homestead complex ===
In addition to the homestead, three remote mustering huts, a restored forge (south-west of the homestead) and hay or corn shed and reconstructed set of stockyards comprise the remaining infrastructure within the pastoral station precinct. These are in the same area, south-west of the homestead complex.

Orchard stables are north-west of the homestead complex.

Duval's hut and yards are south of the homestead complex. An Aboriginal stockman's hut is south-west of the homestead complex.

=== Homestead (1893) ===
The main house is a four-room vertical red cedar timber plank (locally-cut and sawn) structure which originally had verandahs on all sides and two small rooms built into the south-east and south-west corners of the verandahs. This house replaced an earlier (1890) 3-roomed vertical timber plank hut, which was then converted into its kitchen block.

Prior to 1900, a dining room was created by filling in the gap between the house and its original kitchen block (demolished in 1973) and making a breezeway of the verandah of the first kitchen section.

Electricity was installed in 1973. At this time, the old kitchen section was demolished and a new one built in the same location.

=== Condition ===
As at 15 August 1997, physical condition was reported as good.

The homestead is largely intact. The cultural landscape in which the structures are situated remains an intact record of changing land use, retaining many of its original features.

== Heritage listing ==
The cultural significance of Kunderang East, lies in the way its frontier environment made clear the tragic processes of early European settlement and intensified and sharpened the nature of pastoral processes and experiences. It was this frontier where Aboriginal people were forced from the coast and tablelands and where their resistance resulted in massacres on Cunderang. It was also the steep, isolation of the country which earned a reputation for stock and created bush legends of the abilities of stockmen and their abilities. The isolation meant that nineteenth century ways of doing things were carried on well into the twentieth century. It also protected the area from large scale clearing, leaving a landscape largely unchanged in 150 years.

The tragedy of early conflicts; the bush legends created out of adversity; and the preservation of a landscape that captures a sense of history and isolation are the legacy of frontier experience that is perhaps more uniquely Australian than more comfortable properties elsewhere. In this way Kunderang East is significant as a symbol for the Australian bush experience.

Kunderang East Pastoral Station was listed on the New South Wales State Heritage Register on 2 April 1999 having satisfied the following criteria.

The place is important in demonstrating the course, or pattern, of cultural or natural history in New South Wales.

Kunderang East Station is historically significant because when established in c.1841 as Cunderang it was one of the earliest on the Macleay River. Its history demonstrates the major processes of early European settlement. The existing cedar homestead provides tangible evidence of natural resource exploitation. By the 1840s, cedar had almost disappeared from the northern rivers, that the main house at Kunderang could have been built entirely of cedar in 1892 is testament to its remoteness and inaccessibility. The number of massacres that occurred in the area of Kunderang East were a tragic consequence of the dispossession experienced by Aborigines. Kunderang East has an historical association with prominent persons involved in early settlement including Major A.C Innes, commandant of the penal colony of Port Maquarie who was a business associates of its first owner Captain George Jobling.

The place is important in demonstrating aesthetic characteristics and/or a high degree of creative or technical achievement in New South Wales.

The historic landscape of cleared grassed paddocks surrounding the homestead, ringed by massive mountain ranges is significant because it has changed little since it was the site of the first station huts in c. 1841 and reflects the isolation that occurred historically. The colour and warmth of large areas of red cedar and other unpainted timbers, create an internal ambiance of rare quality. The homestead is architecturally significant as the only known pit sawn Australian red cedar plank house constructed as late as 1892. It is the only one surviving on the coast of New South Wales.

The place has a strong or special association with a particular community or cultural group in New South Wales for social, cultural or spiritual reasons.

Kunderang East has special significance for Aboriginal people as the site of many massacres, a result of the dispossession experienced by Aborigines. It also provides tangible evidence of the major contribution that Aboriginal men and women made to the pastoral industry and of the labour arrangements made between the property manager and particular Aboriginal families to supply labour. The homestead also has broader significance for what it demonstrates about changing social customs and multi functional use. Some aspects of Kunderang's history imbue it with cultural significance at least at a state level. The two Aboriginal massacres known to have occurred on Kunderang give this place special significance to Aboriginal people and can be considered therefore to have cultural significance on a state level.

The place possesses uncommon, rare or endangered aspects of the cultural or natural history of New South Wales.

Kunderang East is rare in it aesthetic and historic values.
