= Banksia Point =

Coordinates: 30°29′S 152°24′E

Banksia Point is a point on a ridge overlooking the Bellinger River valley. It is located at 30° 29' S 152° 24' E, within the New England National Park on the Northern Tablelands in New South Wales, Australia.

The name refers to the plant genus Banksia, which grows in the area.

There are a number of cabins and a hut at Banksia Point for visitors. These are available from the National Parks and Wildlife Service for short term stays.

From Banksia Point there are many bushwalking tracks providing access to some of the area's attractions, including Weeping Rock. 10 minutes walk north along an escarpment, is the peak and picnic area known as Point Lookout.
