= Tin Mine Falls =

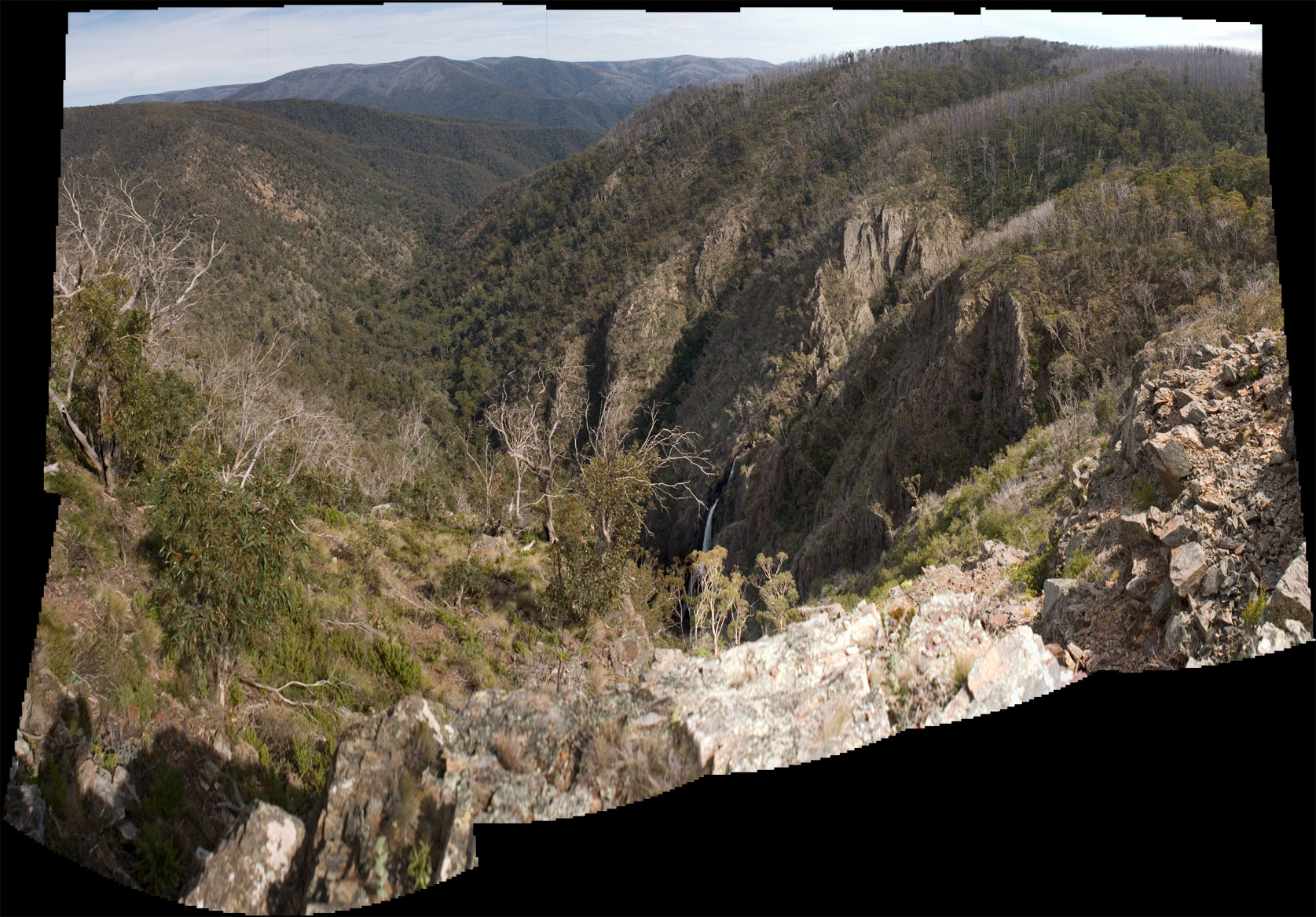
- Tin Mine Falls

- Location within New South Wales
- Location: Snowy Mountains, New South Wales, Australia
- Coordinates: 36°39′59″S 148°14′05″E
- Type: Cascade
- Total height: 130 metres (430 ft)
- Watercourse: Tin Mine Creek

The Tin Mine Falls is a cascade waterfall located in the remote Pilot Wilderness Area within the Kosciuszko National Park in the Snowy Mountains region of New South Wales, Australia. Described from top to bottom, the falls consist of non-segmented tiered cascades over bedrock with a few smaller plunges, followed by a single large plunge into a pool. The falls are recessed into a punchbowl feature making it impossible to view the entire waterfall from a single location on the ground.

== Location and features ==
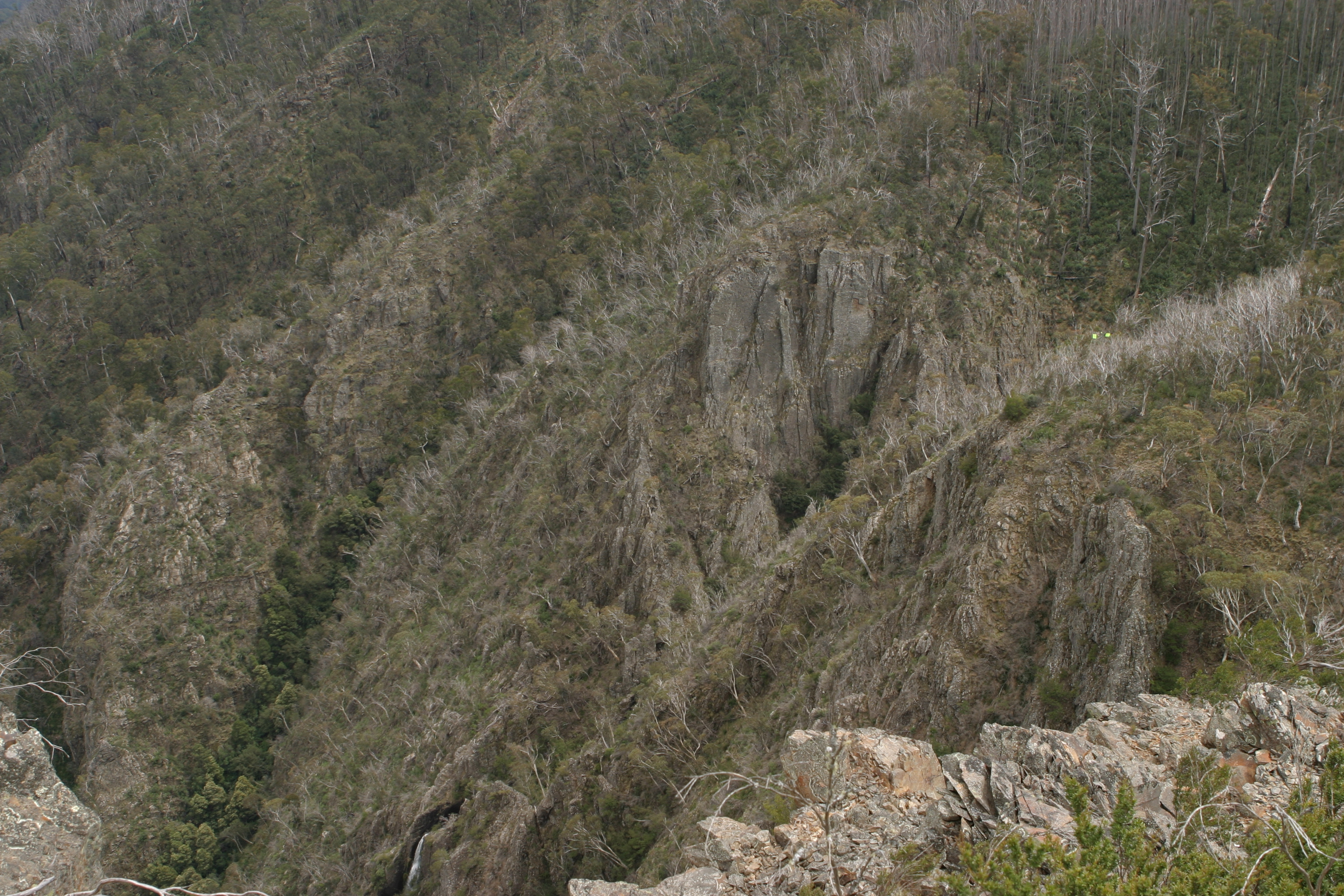
The forbidding terrain around Tin Mine Falls

The falls are located in remote country within the Kosciuszko National Park. The closest access point is the Cascade Fire Trail, a hiking trail that runs south from the Alpine Way, west of Thredbo Village.

The height of Tin Mine Falls is listed as 459 metres (1,506 ft) or 360 metres (1,180 ft), and quote a story concerning the origin of this figure: "The falls were apparently measured in 1990 by a Dr. John Pease ... using a plumb line". According to the World Waterfall Database, Tin Mine Falls is the 462nd tallest waterfall in the world, with a total height of 213 metres (699 ft). Official data from Geoscience Australia list the most significant waterfalls in Australia as:

- Wallaman Falls – Queensland, 305m
- Wollomombi Falls – New South Wales, 220 metres (720 ft) with a 100-metre (330 ft) single drop
- Ellenborough Falls – New South Wales 160 metres (520 ft) in a single drop

== Conclusions ==
The estimated height of 160–180 metres (520–590 ft) corresponds with topography but contradicts Geoscience Australia's list of the tallest waterfalls in Australia (this would make Tin Mine Falls the 3rd highest on the continent). Unless the upper limit of the falls is fixed well upstream, to include a long section of shallow-slope non-bedrock streambed, the rumoured height of 360–459 metres (1,181–1,506 ft) cannot be substantiated.

== See also ==
- List of waterfalls
- List of waterfalls in Australia
