= Jeogla, New South Wales =

Jeogla New South Wales
- Coordinates: 30°34′00″S 152°07′00″E
- Population: 40 (2016 census)
- Postcode(s): 2350
- Location: 51 km (32 mi) E of Armidale
- LGA(s): Armidale Regional Council
- State electorate(s): Northern Tablelands
- Federal division(s): New England

Jeogla is a locality in the Armidale Regional Council region of New South Wales, Australia. It contains much of Cunnawarra National Park and the Georges Creek Nature Reserve. It had a population of 40 people as of the 2016 census.

A postal receiving office opened at Jeogla on 17 May 1920, and was upgraded to a post office on 9 December that year. It closed on 24 September 1981.

Jeogla School operated from 1890 to 1891, 1893 to 1902, 1908 to 1915 (half-time with Chandler from 1908 to 1909) and from 1918 until its final closure in 1968.

== Heritage listings ==
Jeogla has a number of heritage-listed sites, including:

- Oxley Wild Rivers National Park: Kunderang East Pastoral Station
