= New England National Park =

National park in Australia

- IUCN category Ib (wilderness area)
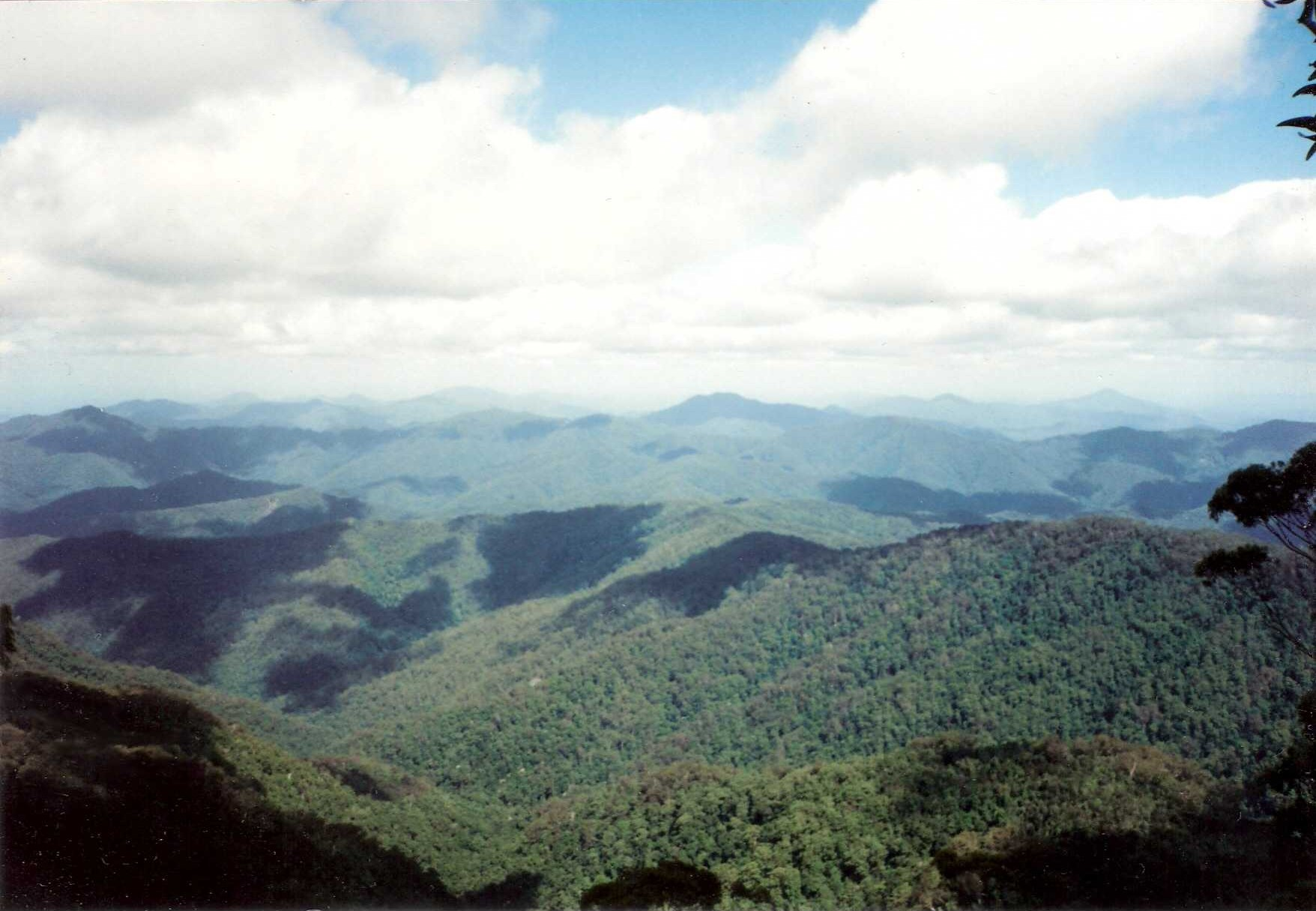
- Along the escarpment there are a number of lookouts providing expansive views.

- Location within New South Wales
- Location: New South Wales
- Nearest city: Dorrigo
- Coordinates: 30°35′34″S 152°27′30″E
- Area: 673 km^{2} (260 sq mi)
- Established: May 1937
- Governing body: NSW National Parks & Wildlife Service
- Website: Official website

The New England National Park is a protected national park located on the Northern Tablelands in the New England region of New South Wales, Australia. The 67,303-hectare (166,310-acre) park was created in May 1935 and is situated approximately 560 kilometres (350 mi) north of Sydney, and 10 kilometres (6.2 mi) south of Waterfall Way, just 85 kilometres (53 mi) east of Armidale and 65 kilometres (40 mi) west of Coffs Harbour. The closest village to New England National Park is Ebor, located 20 kilometres (12 mi) away.

The park is part of the New England Group World Heritage Site Gondwana Rainforests of Australia inscribed in 1986 and added to the Australian National Heritage List in 2007.

More than 1,000 plant species are found within the park, attracting prolific birdlife.

== History ==
In the 1920s Phillip Wright of Wollomombi led the push to have this area declared a National Park. Most of the area was declared a reserve in 1931 and in 1935 dedicated for public recreation. Between 1934 and 1956 mining leases for antimony were granted.

The national park was officially opened by the Governor General Lord Gowrie in 1937, although the wilderness area was recognised for its beauty as early as the 1920s.

New England National Park (NENP) was World Heritage listed in 1986 and forms part of the New England Group of the Gondwana Rainforests of Australia (previously the Central Eastern Rainforest Reserves of Australia) (CERRA). In 1999 the Mount Killekrankie area, which had been subject to anti-logging blockade earlier in the decade, was added to the park. The Gondwana Rainforests of Australia was added to the Australian National Heritage List in 2007.

== Geography ==
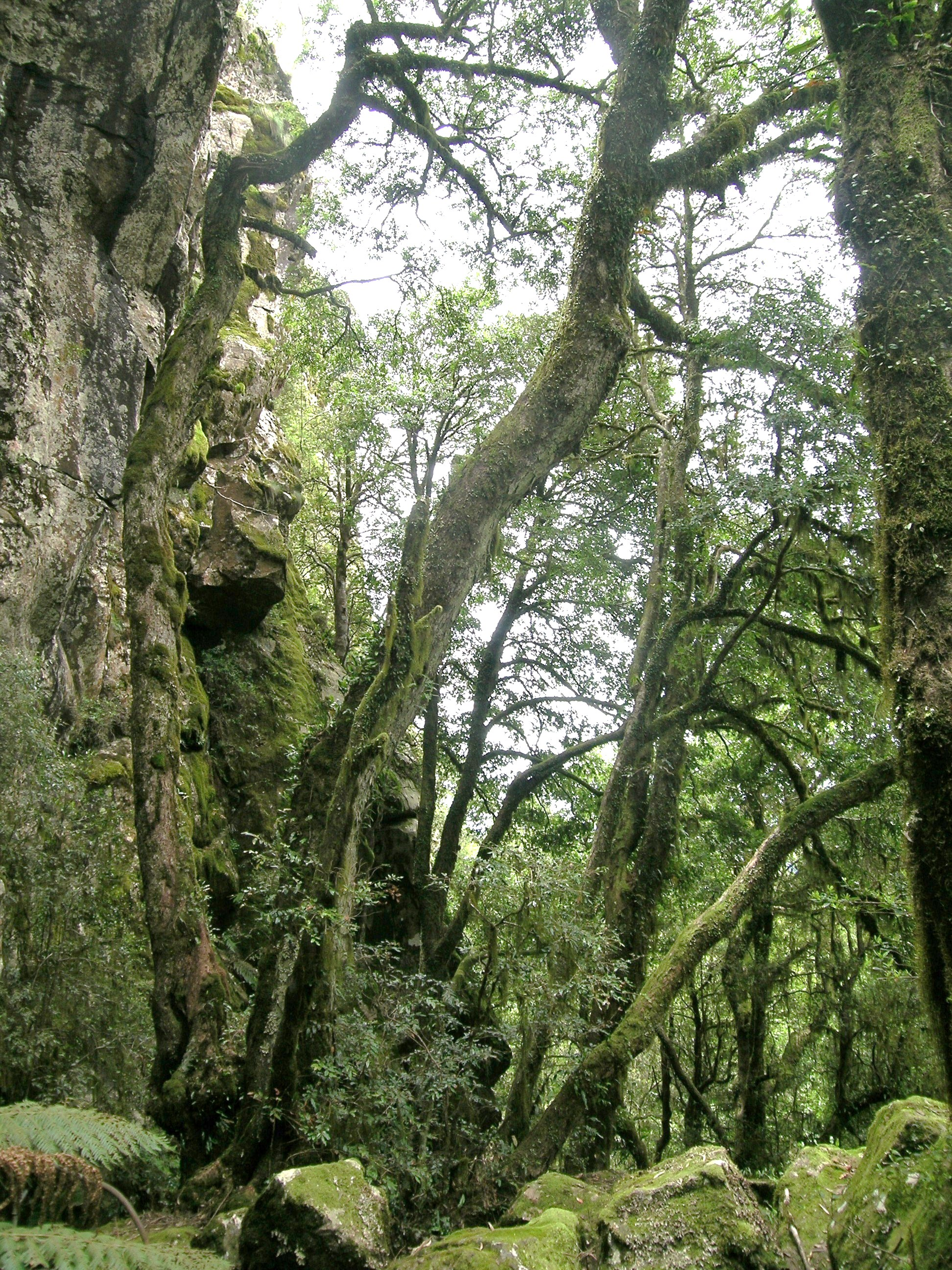
Moss covered trees and rocks on the Weeping Rock track

Located on the precipitous escarpment on the east of the undulating Northern Tablelands plateau, the wilderness consists of impressive cliffs, rugged ridges, spurs and streams. To the west the Nymboida, Guy Fawkes and Styx Rivers drain across the tablelands. To the east is the thickly forested Bellinger River valley.

The Cunnawarra National Park adjoins the New England National Park on the north-western boundary and the Bellinger River National Park joins it on the north-eastern corner.

Public access to the park focuses on the Point Lookout area, at 1,563 metres (5,128 ft) above sea level, from where on a clear day the Tasman Sea is visible. This lookout is the second tallest mountain in the region and one of the highest places north of the Snowy Mountains.

== Flora and fauna ==
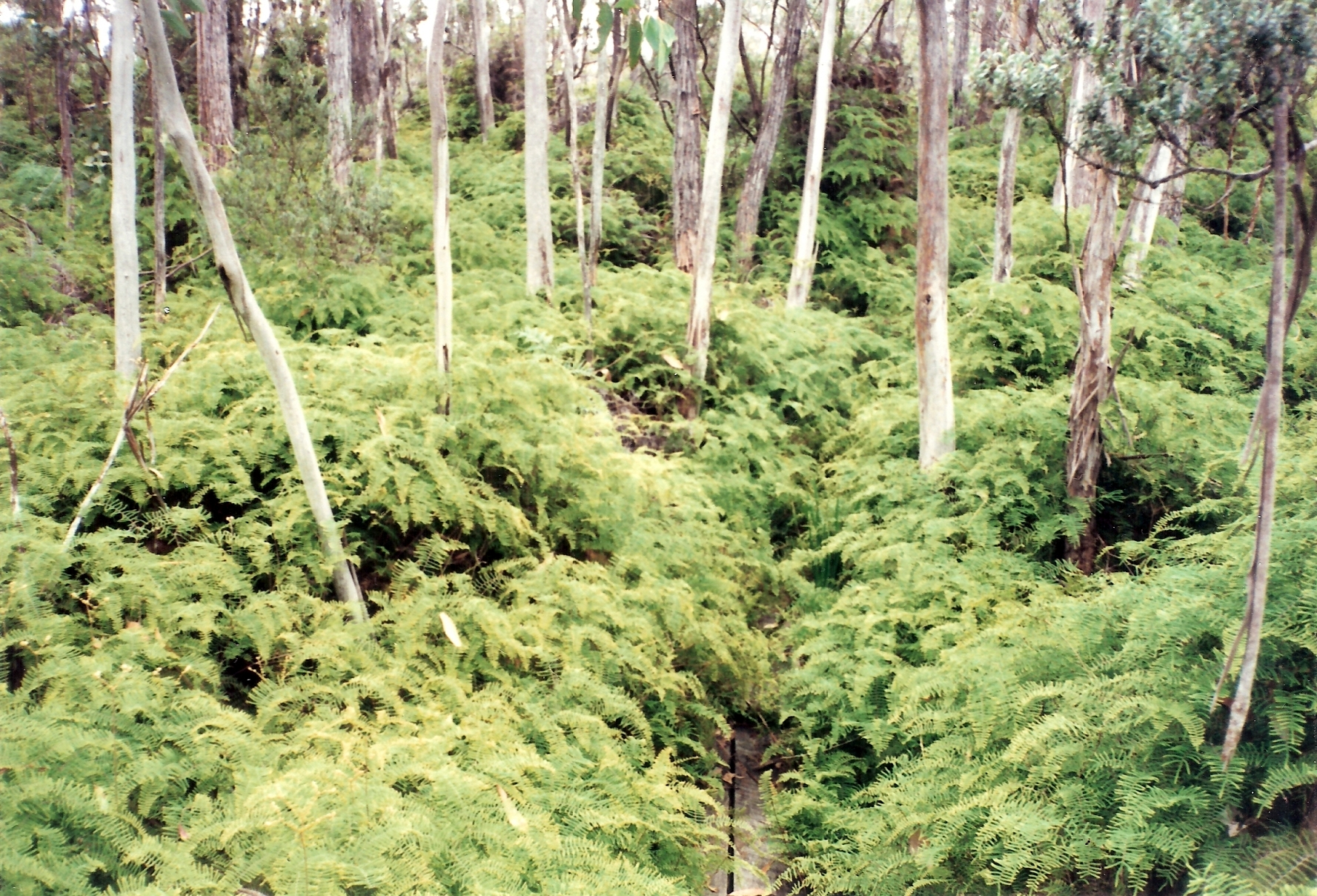
Snow gums and coral ferns on the Lyrebird Walk.

The park lies within the Eastern Australian temperate forests ecoregion. It is noted for the wide variety of plant and animal species. The diverse vegetation in the park includes sub-tropical, warm temperate and cool temperate rainforest in the higher altitudes. There are also areas of sclerophyll forest, sub-alpine woodland, heathland and swampland. In the eucalpyt forests Brush box, Sydney blue gum and Tallow-wood predominate.

Heathland is found at Wrights Lookout and in other patches. Previous estimates of the number of different plant species in the park place the figure at 500. This figure has been revised upwards to around 1,000. This includes snow gums (Eucalyptus pauciflora), Antarctic beech, tree ferns and red cedars (Toona ciliata).

Dingos, koalas, tiger quolls, common bentwing bats, brown antechinuses, and northern brown bandicoots are some of the mammals found in the park.

=== Birds ===
At least 100 species of birds have been recorded. Larger species include the wedge-tailed eagle, greater sooty owl, sulphur-crested cockatoo and superb lyrebird. Eastern whipbirds, eastern bristlebirds, crimson rosellas, Australian king parrots and several kinds of honeyeaters also inhabit the reserve.

The park has been identified by BirdLife International as an Important Bird Area (IBA) because it supports one of five remaining populations of rufous scrub-birds, as well as of flame and pale-yellow robins, paradise riflebirds, green catbirds, regent bowerbirds and Australian logrunners.

== Facilities ==
There is an extensive walking track system that traverses the higher areas of the park.

Limited accommodation is available in the park at Banksia Point. If visiting in winter it is a good idea to bring warm clothes because at such a high altitude the region experiences frequent snow falls and cold temperatures.

== See also ==
- Nambucca River
- Protected areas of New South Wales
- Taylors Arm (New South Wales)
