= Cunnawarra National Park =

National park in Australia

- IUCN category II (national park)
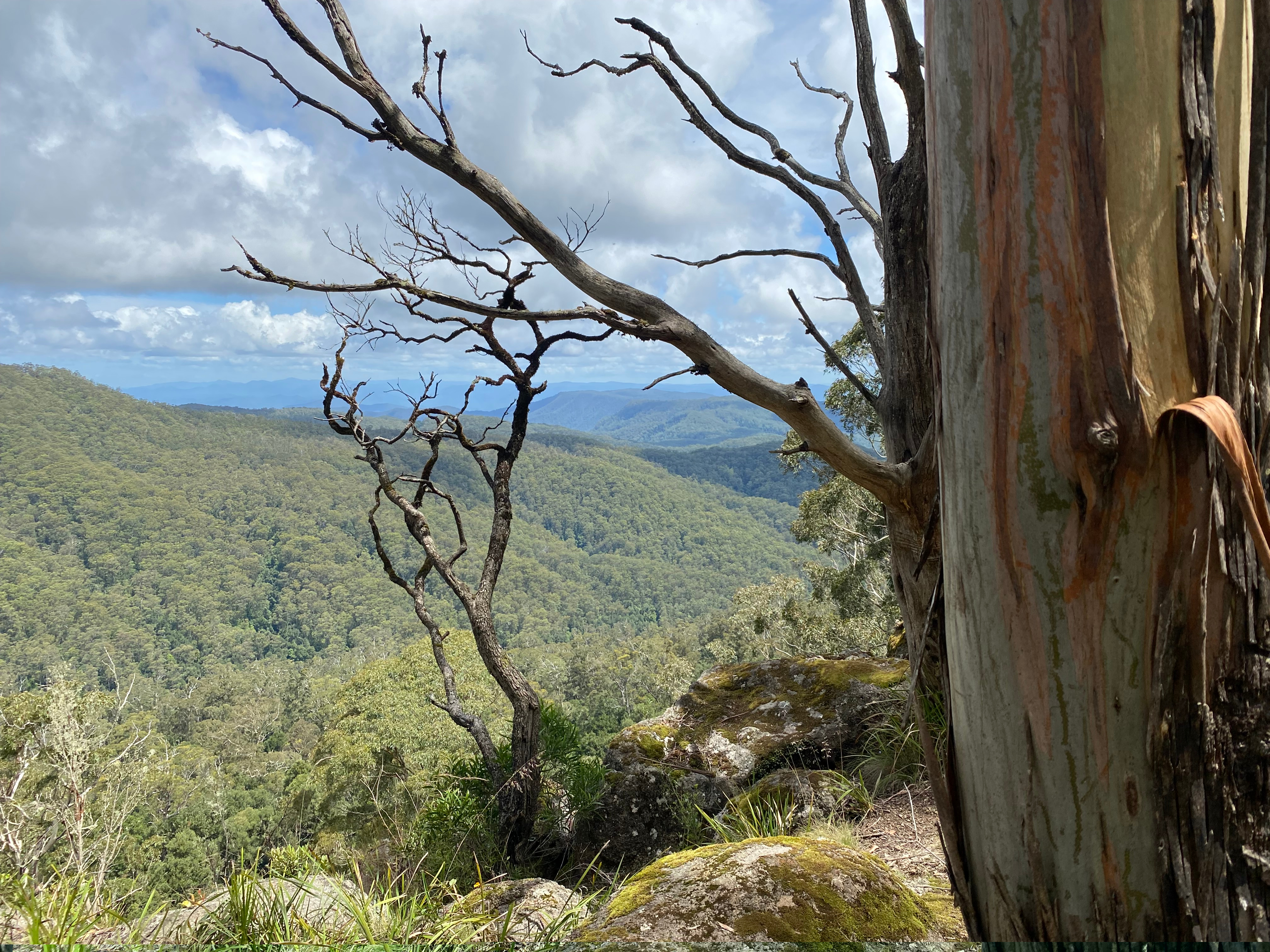
- Beech Lookout

- Location within New South Wales
- Location: New South Wales
- Coordinates: 30°37′29″S 152°13′02″E
- Area: 158 km^{2} (61 sq mi)
- Established: 1 January 1999
- Governing body: NSW National Parks & Wildlife Service

Cunnawarra is a national park located in New South Wales, Australia, 80 kilometres (50 mi) east of Armidale, 10 kilometres (6.2 mi) off the Waterfall Way and 565 kilometres (351 mi) north of Sydney. The 25-kilometre (16 mi) Styx River Forest Way runs from the Point Lookout Road through Cunnawarra National Park to the Kempsey Road. The New England National Park adjoins the Cunnawarra National Park on the north-eastern boundary and the Oxley Wild Rivers National Park joins it on the southern corner.

The Park is part of the New England Group of the World Heritage Site Gondwana Rainforests of Australia inscribed in 1986 and added to the Australian National Heritage List in 2007.

Cunnawarra is home to the tallest eucalyptus trees in NSW, and to endangered wildlife species including the glossy black cockatoo (Calyptorhynchus lathami), the rufous scrub-bird (Atrichornis rufescens), the powerful owl (Ninox strenua) and the spotted-tailed quoll (Dasyurus maculatus).

== See also ==
- Protected areas of New South Wales
