= Wollomombi Falls =

Waterfall on the Wollomombi River in New South Wales, Australia

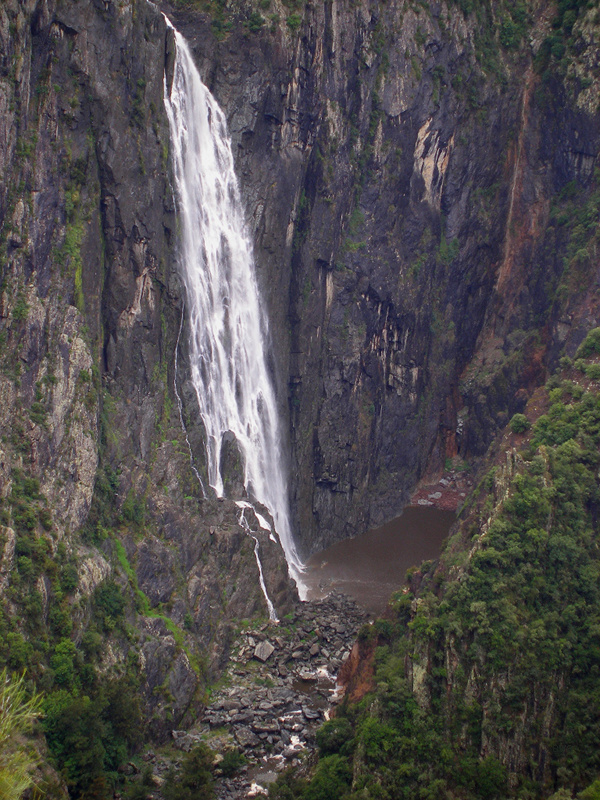
- Wollomombi Falls

- Location within New South Wales
- Location: New England, New South Wales, Australia
- Coordinates: 30°31′55″S 152°02′05″E
- Type: Plunge
- Elevation: 907 metres (2,976 ft) AHD
- Total height: 150–230 metres (490–750 ft)
- Number of drops: 1
- Longest drop: 100 metres (330 ft)
- Watercourse: Wollomombi River

The Wollomombi Falls is a horsetail waterfall on the Wollomombi River in the New England region of New South Wales, Australia.

== Location and features ==
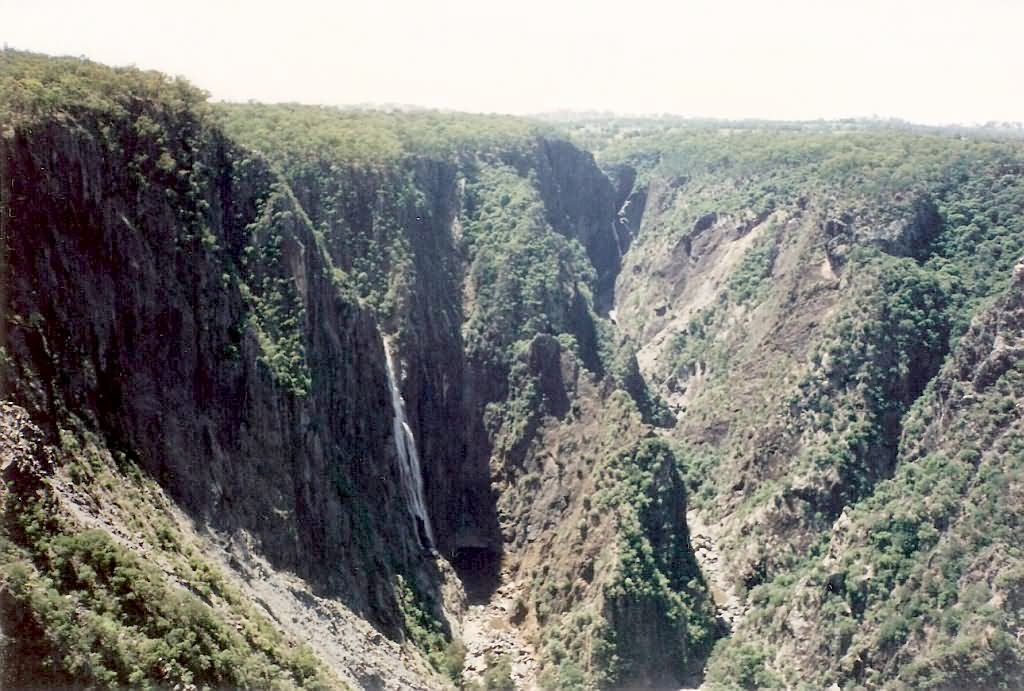
Wollomombi Falls and Chandler Falls (on right)

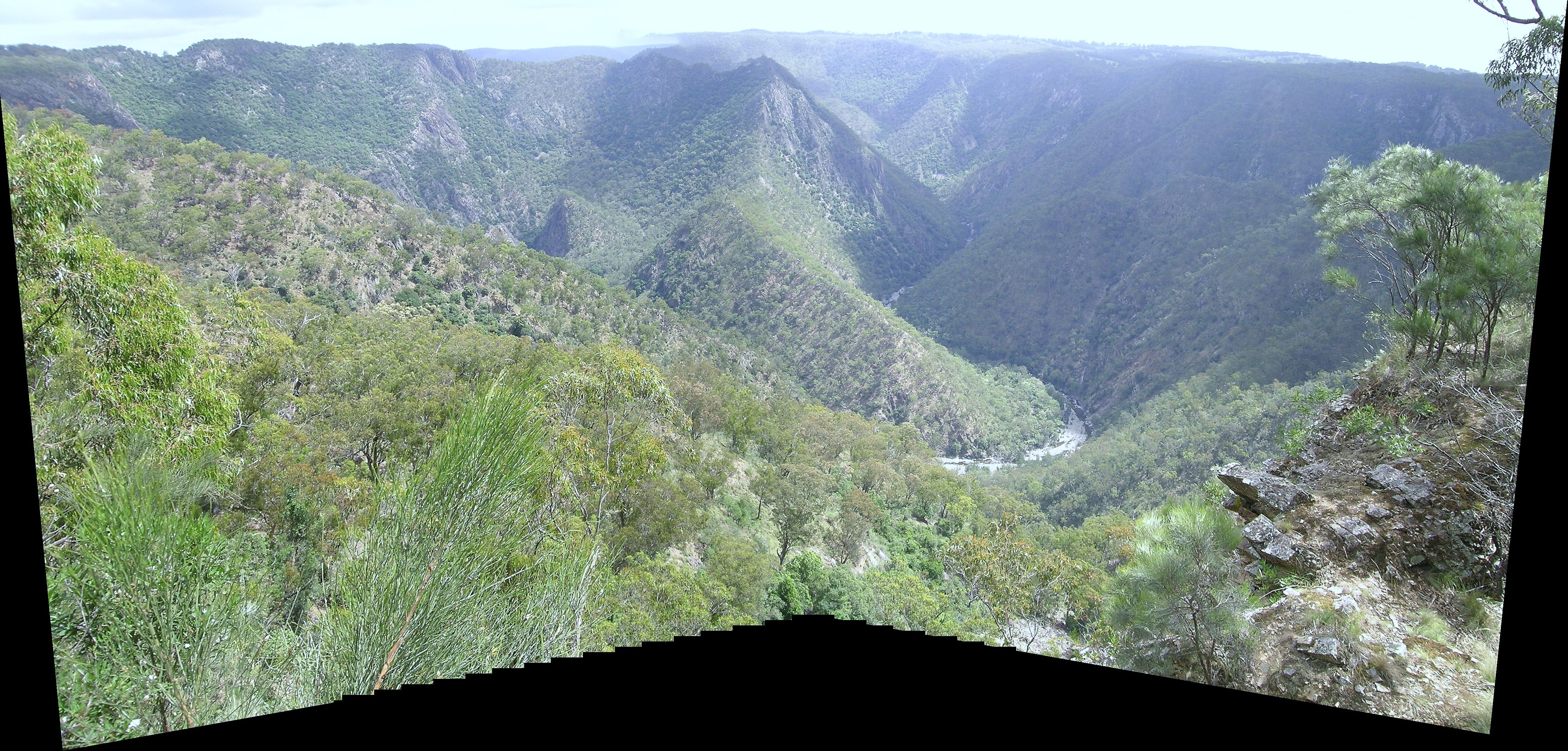
View from Edgar's Lookout, Wollomombi, NSW

In the Oxley Wild Rivers National Park approximately 40 kilometres (25 mi) due east of Armidale and 1.45 kilometres (0.90 mi) off the Waterfall Way, the Wollomombi Falls are atop the Wollomombi Gorge near the confluence of the Wollomombi River with the Chandler River. The Chandler Falls are on the Chandler River, adjacent to the Wollomombi Falls. The falls descend from an elevation of 907 metres (2,976 ft) above sea level (AHD) in one drop of 100 metres (330 ft), with a total descent that ranges in height between 150–230 metres (490–750 ft) depending on the flow of the river.

At one time they were believed to be the tallest in Australia. However, recent geographical revisions place them at second or third tallest, depending on the source, after the Tin Mine Falls in the Snowy Mountains and the Wallaman Falls, near Ingham, Queensland.

=== Hiking tracks and campground ===
Several camp grounds and walking tracks are adjacent to the Wollomombi Falls and provide access to see the waterfall. Constructed by the National Parks and Wildlife Service are the Wollomombi Gorge and Falls Picnic Area, the 4-kilometre-long (2.5 mi) long, three-hour return Wollomombi Walking Track, the 2.5-kilometre-long (1.6 mi), 90-minute return Chandler Walking Track, and the Wollomombi Campground. The Chandler Walk route passes Checks Lookout before reaching the Chandler Lookout and then winding down to the bottom of the gorge downstream from the falls. Checks Lookout is about a third of the way along this walk with a view back along the gorge to the falls. The track ends 400 metres (1,300 ft) below the top of the gorge. The Wollomombi Walk goes upstream past a lookout platform and across the Wollomombi River on a long steel bridge. The track continues to another lookout platform, which looks down on the falls from the opposite side of the gorge. A further extension of the track ends at a platform with views into the Chandler River gorge, which joins the Wollomombi Gorge.

Edgars Lookout provides an accessible view of the gorge on the western side of the falls lookouts.

Facilities include drinking water, pit toilets, shelter shed, fireplace, and bush camping sites. There is also an information display.

== See also ==
- List of waterfalls
- List of waterfalls of Australia
