= Point Lookout (New South Wales) =

Mountain in New South Wales, Australia

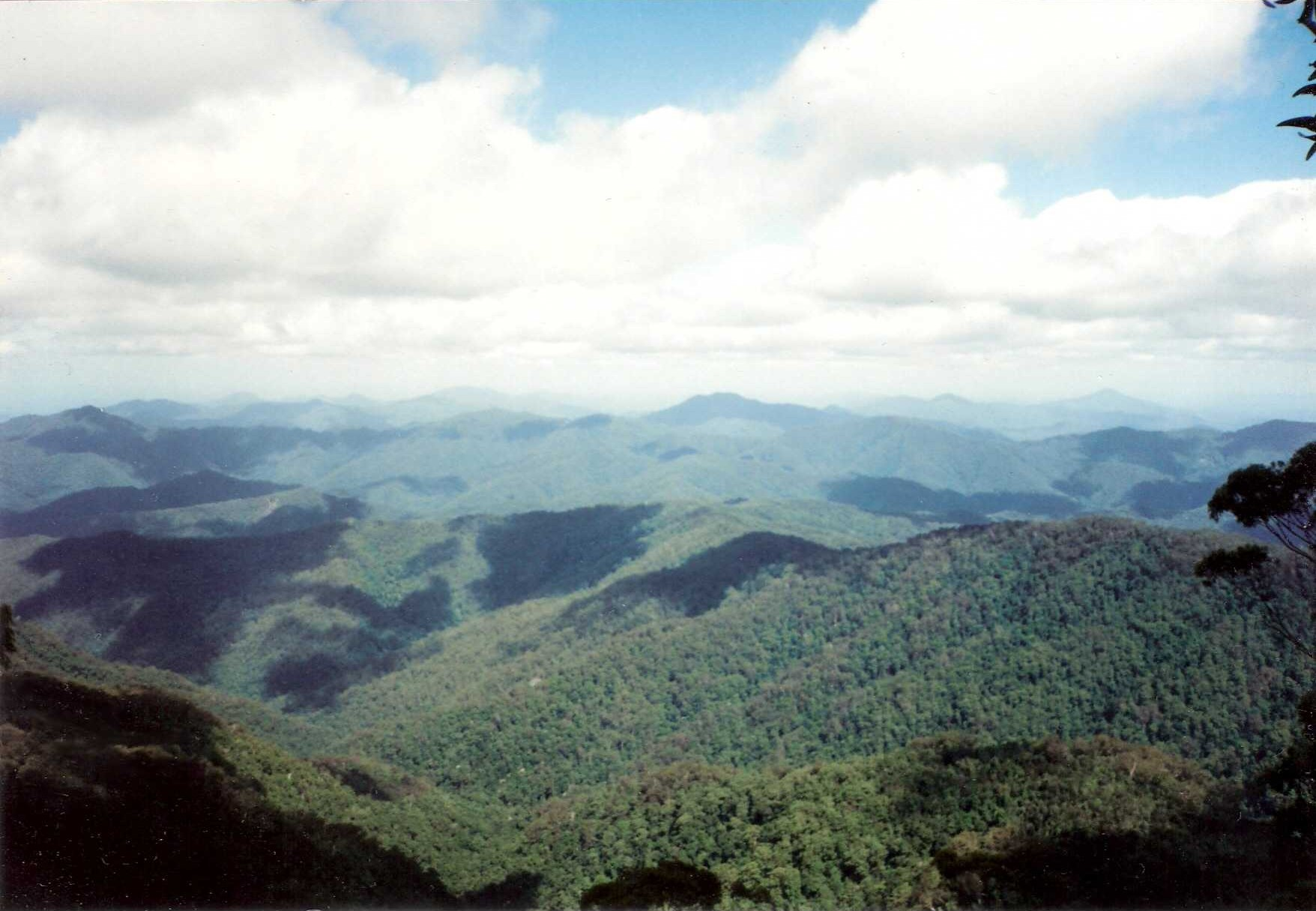
- The view from Point Lookout

Highest point
- Elevation: 1,564 m (5,131 ft)
- Coordinates: 30°29′S 152°24′E

Geography
- Location: Northern Tablelands, New South Wales, Australia
- Parent range: Snowy Range, Great Dividing Range

Point Lookout, a mountain on the Snowy Range, a spur of the Great Dividing Range, is located in the New England National Park on the eastern edge of the Northern Tablelands in the New England region of New South Wales, Australia.

With an altitude of 1,564 metres (5,131 ft) above sea level, Point Lookout is the second highest peak in the region. During cold spells the mountain may receive a light dusting of snow.

== Description ==
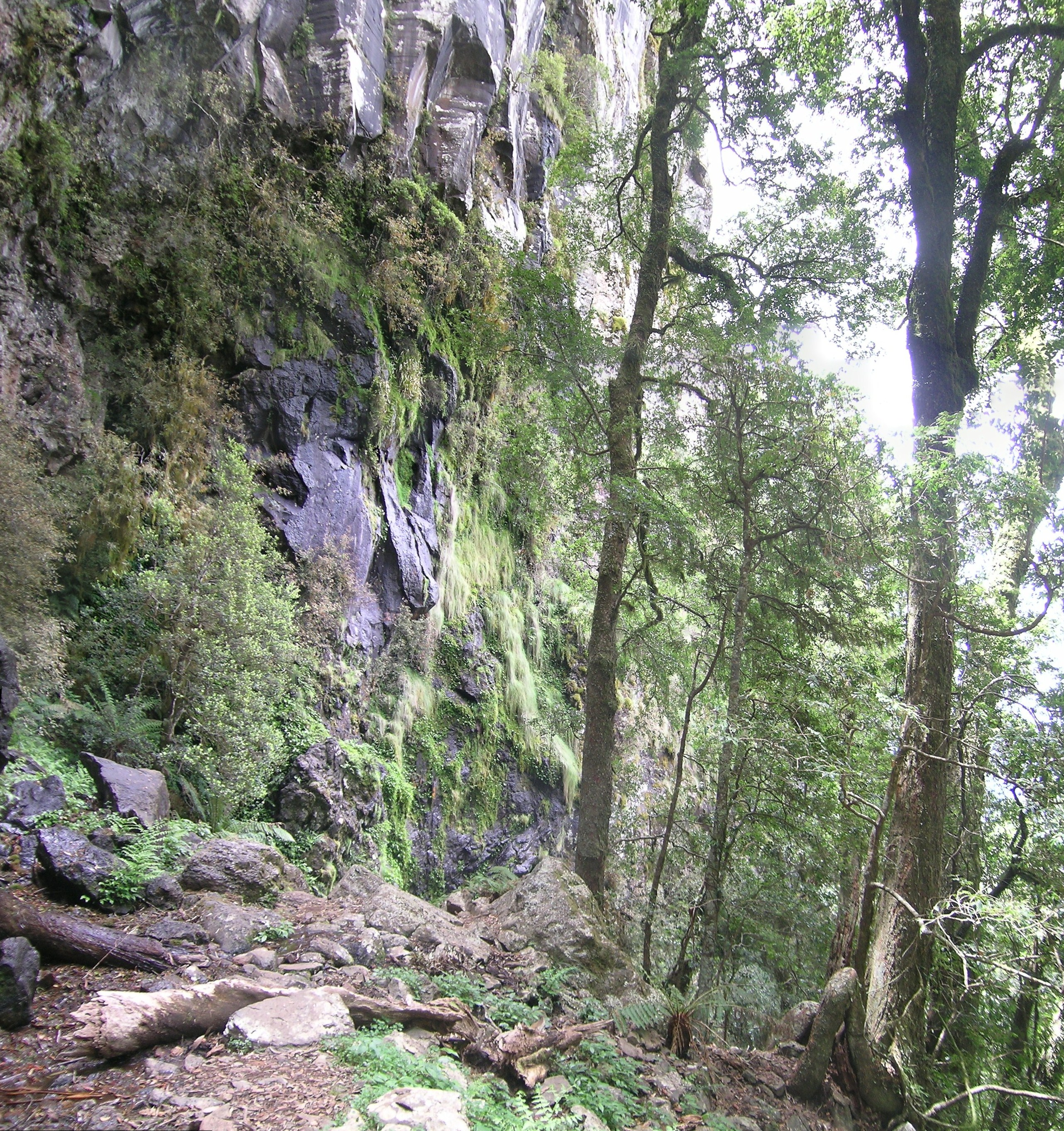
The escarpment, Point Lookout

Point Lookout is also the name of the main visitor location in the New England National Park. The Point Lookout Road is accessed via Waterfall Way and is 85 kilometres (53 mi) east of Armidale and 75 kilometres (47 mi) from Dorrigo, near Ebor. The lookouts have views east across the Bellinger River valley, out to the more developed areas of the north coast of New South Wales and the Tasman Sea on a clear day.

On the escarpment only 10 minutes walk south is Banksia Point. There are a number of cabins and a hut here. These are available from the National Parks and Wildlife Service for short term stays in the park.

== See also ==
- List of mountains in Australia § New South Wales
