= Walcha =

Walcha can refer to

- Walcha, New South Wales, a town in northeastern New South Wales, Australia
- Walcha Shire, a local government area including the town
- Helmut Walcha (1907–1991), a German organist
