= Brackendale =

Brackendale is the name of two towns in Canada and Australia:

- Brackendale, British Columbia
- Brackendale, New South Wales
