= Ohio Homestead =

- Location within New South Wales Location within Australia
- 30°58′02″S 151°36′49″E
- Location: Walcha, Walcha Shire, New South Wales, Australia

History
- Built: 1834–1837

Site notes
- Owner: Ohio Homestead Pty Ltd

New South Wales Heritage Register
- Official name: Ohio Homestead
- Type: State heritage (built)
- Designated: 2 April 1999
- Reference no.: 463
- Type: Homestead building
- Category: Residential buildings (private)

Ohio Homestead is a heritage-listed farm and former boy's home located at Walcha in the Walcha Shire, in New South Wales, Australia. It was built from 1834 to 1837. The property is owned by Ohio Homestead Pty Ltd and it was added to the New South Wales State Heritage Register on 2 April 1999.

== History ==
Ohio is Walcha's oldest house and, with Salisbury Court, Uralla, is one of the two remaining homes of New England surviving from the 1840s.

It has an attractive setting, looking down on the willow-lined Ohio Creek and is surrounded by elms and pines protecting it from hot westerly winds. The permanent waterhole in the creek, probably first determined its position.

Ohio was first taken up about 1836 by John Herring Boughton, who lived at Tillimby on the Paterson River near Gresford. In July 1839, when New England's first Crown Lands' Commissioner, G. J. Macdonald, visited the Walcha area, Ohio consisted of three slab huts where eight men lived and it had a two-hectare (five-acre) paddock of wheat, 3,285 sheep, nine head of cattle and one horse.

When the first NSW census, which included New England, was taken in 1841, there were thirteen men at Ohio, most of whom were assigned shepherds working for Boughton under the supervision of John Townshend.

In 1842, Boughton sold his depasturing licence to Abraham Nivison, a Scotsman from Sanquhar, Dumfriesshire. He had sailored from Greenock, Scotland on the Superb, a ship of 576 tonnes (635 short tons), on 13 July 1839, with his bride, Mary Wightman, whom he had married a fortnight earlier. The young couple joined her brother, A. S. Wightman in the Hunter Valley, where they gained experience of colonial conditions and looked about for a suitable place to settle. New England's climate and pastoral potential must have appealed to them because soon after they bought the Ohio run, they went up to the Northern Tablelands to live and began to build the stone homestead.

When Mary Nivison arrived at Ohio with one young daughter, she would have been among the small number of about 120 women living in New England, an area approximately the size of Britain. Her first son, born in 1842, died at Ohio before his second birthday and is buried below the house. Ohio land did not belong to Abraham Nivison until 1854. It had been held under an annual grazing licence of A£10, with an assessment on the number of stock on the run.

With an area of approximately 8,100 hectares (20,000 acres) in 1847, Ohio carried 4,250 sheep, 97 cattle and eight horses. By 1851, it held 5,356 sheep, 217 cattle and 26 horses and was run in conjunction with Congi, a run of 6,500 hectares (16,000 acres) and about 4,000 sheep. After several requests, Abraham Nivison received permission to purchase part of his head station of 65 hectares (160 acres) with another 123 and 129 hectares (304 and 320 acres), for which deeds were prepared in September 1854. In the same year he purchased Tillimby from J. H. Boughton and, with a mortgage on that land grant, borrowed money to progressively purchase the Ohio lands over the next two decades. Other properties bought included Yarrowitch, east of Walcha; Prospect, near Commissioners Waters, Armidale and Thorndale, near Warwick on the Darling Downs.

Abraham Nivison's interests revolved around his pastoral business, his church and his family. His interest in pastoral affairs can be seen with his encouragement of trial plots of pasture grasses at Ohio and Yarrowitch; introduction of Tasmanian Merino sheep from Youngtown in 1868 to improve the Ohio fine wool flock, which had come from Boughton's purchase of merinos from the Macarthur family. This interest in the nutrition of his sheep and development of improved pastures was carried on by his sons and daughters and, particularly, his grandson, A. S. Nivison.

By the 1870s the Nivisons increased and consolidated the holding to approximately 12,000 hectares (30,000 acres) converting their lease from crown land to freehold as they went.

In Scotland, the Nivisons had a long tradition of participation in the Presbyterian Church as elders and ministers. In New England, Abraham Nivison was instrumental in establishing and supporting the Presbyterian Church. Itinerant ministers visited Walcha from 1845 and the first minister appointed to New England was soon persuaded to move his headquarters from Armidale to Walcha. In 1857 a wooden Presbyterian Church was built and replaced by the existing church, opened in 1888 on land donated by Abraham Nivison, who also gave A£500 for its construction. It was named St. Mary's after his wife but the name was later changed to St. Paul's.

Abraham Nivison and his wife raised a family of three sons and three daughters at Ohio. Mary Nivison died in November 1873, but Abraham lived another 20 years and died at Ohio on 25 April 1895.

The house then lay empty for some years but about the turn of the century his eldest son, James, who had lived at The Glen, a few miles up the Ohio Creek, moved with his family to Ohio. When Abraham Nivison died his estate was valued for probate at A£48,233.

His eldest son, James, inherited Ohio where he had been born in 1848 and lived until his death there in 1914. He married Mary Perry, granddaughter of Deputy Surveyor General S. A. Perry in 1878 and they raised a family of eleven children at Ohio. James Nivison was for many years a magistrate and member of the Armidale Pastures Protection Board. He was a keen sportsman, introducing golf to the district on the Ohio links, and his sons formed the Ohio Polo team, which completed successfully against northern teams between the wars, with polo carnivals being held regularly at Ohio.

On Mirani, part of the old Ohio run, pasture improvement experiments from the 1920s led to the introduction of aerial methods to apply fertilizer in February 1950, with the transformation of pastoral carrying capacity for the tablelands.

Ohio remained the centre of family activities until after the death of Mary, in May 1931. The house passed to a grandson of Abraham Nivison, another James Nivison.

Many of Abraham Nivison's descendants, living on subdivisions of the original Ohio property, followed in the tradition he established as forerunners of new stock management and breeding programmes. They included F. W. Nivison and his son, J. F. Nivison, both vice presidents of the Royal Agricultural Society of New South Wales and renowned as expert judges of horses and cattle; A. S. Nivison an innovator in pasture improvement in New England, a leading judge of fine wool Merino sheep and holder, on many occasions, of Australian record prizes for his wool at the Newcastle wool sales; S. N. Nivison, foundation president of the North and North-West Racing Association, member of the Council of the Australian Jockey Club and only country representative on the TAB. at its foundations; P. M. Nivison, managing director of Farm Plan, a computer-system company bringing new technological methods to rural management; and Angus Nivison, landscape artist and winner in 1979 of the Herald Art Award.

In 1950 Ohio was taken over by the Church of England, who used it for some years as a boys home and later, as a conference centre. When the Church put it on the market in 1970, it was bought back by the descendants of Abraham Nivison and is now owned by Ohio Homestead Pty Ltd.

These days the Ohio estate is represented on a map by Ohio, Ohio North, Yalgoo, Yalgoolygum, Mirani, Marmindi, Petali and Miramoona. Together these subdivisions cover the same area, give or take a few hectares. Ohio and Yalgoolygum represent, for all intents and purposes, lifestyle choices. The family's own historian, Jillian Oppenheimer (1930-2019), lived at Ohio with her husband and fellow author Bruce Mitchell (1935-2009). They were able to buy Ohio back off the Church of England in 1970 and spent several years restoring it into a family home. Essentially it looks very much as it did when it was finally completed in the 1860s.

== Description ==
Ohio homestead was built in three stages. First was probably a single storey four room stone cottage, the second was the southern section with three dormer windows lighting the bedrooms upstairs. Local materials of rough volcanic stone and timber were used to build the house with locally fired bricks used for the chimneys. The low ceilings and thick stone walls were similar to those found in Scottish houses. Interior walls were of slab, lathe and plaster. The roof is made of iron. Brick fireplaces warmed the four main rooms on the ground floor which opened from central hallway and there is a staircase leading up to the bedrooms upstairs. The stone kitchen building behind the house is connected to the main house by a covered walkway, along which vines grew.

Some years later, probably in the late 1870s or early 1880s, the house was extended to the north. A new front door, entrance hall and stairway were built. A sitting room was added downstairs with two small rooms opening off it and upstairs there was another bedroom and storage space. Before the turn of the century an iron roof was put over the shingles so that rain water could be collected for household use. The stone store building was probably built at the same time as the northern extensions to the house or may have been earlier c. 1850.

Some additional wooden buildings were added behind the kitchen in early 1900s. Most station out-buildings had been built of timber and the stables, now demolished, were made of cedar slabs.

The woolshed dates from early this century when machine shearing equipment was installed about 1905.

=== Condition ===
As at 19 February 1998, the homestead has been used in an archaeological excavation and report by the University of New England.

=== Modifications and dates ===
In the 1870s and 1880s the house was extended to the north. In c. 1890s an iron roof was put over the shingles so that rain water could be collected for household use. The house remained a family home for the Nivison's until 1950 when the Church of England bought it and used it firstly as a boy's home and then a conference centre. The church sold the property in 1971 to descendants of the original owner Abraham Nivison and now it is owned by Ohio Homestead Pty. Ltd. In c. 1971–80 the then owners spent several years restoring it into a family home, as it was c. 1860s.

== Heritage listing ==
The homestead is Walcha's oldest house. The property is significant to the history of early NSW pastoral and rural development.

Ohio Homestead was listed on the New South Wales State Heritage Register on 2 April 1999.

== See also ==
- Australian residential architectural styles
