= Apsley Shire =

Former local government area in New South Wales, Australia

Apsley Shire New South Wales
- Established: 7 March 1906
- Abolished: 1 June 1955
- Council seat: Walcha
- Region: New England

Apsley Shire was a local government area in the New England region of New South Wales, Australia.

Apsley Shire was proclaimed on 7 March 1906, one of 134 shires created after the passing of the Local Government (Shires) Act 1905.

The shire offices were based in Walcha.

The Shire was amalgamated with the Municipality of Walcha to form Walcha Shire on 1 June 1955.
