= Walcha Shire =

- Local government area
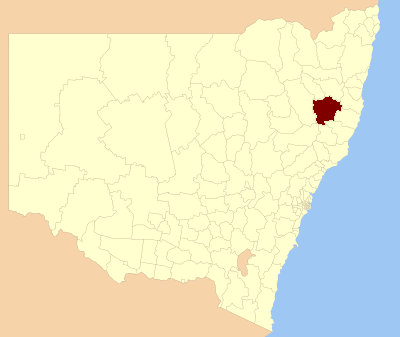
- Location in New South Wales

- Interactive map of Walcha Shire
- Coordinates: 30°59′S 151°36′E
- Country: Australia
- State: New South Wales
- Region: New England
- Established: 1 June 1955
- Council seat: Walcha

Government
  - Mayor: Janelle Archdale (Unaligned)
  - State electorates: Tamworth; Northern Tablelands
  - Federal division: New England

Area
  - Total: 6,267 km^{2} (2,420 sq mi)

Population
  - Totals: 3,092 (2016 census); 3,132 (2018 est.)
  - Density: 0.49338/km^{2} (1.27784/sq mi)
- Website: Walcha Shire
LGAs around Walcha Shire
Uralla	Armidale	Kempsey
Tamworth	Walcha Shire	Port Macquarie-Hastings
Upper Hunter	MidCoast	MidCoast

Walcha Shire is a local government area located in the New England region of New South Wales, Australia. The Shire is situated adjacent to the junction of the Oxley Highway and Thunderbolts Way and is 20 kilometres (12 mi) east of the Main North railway line passing through Walcha Road. The shire was formed on 1 June 1955 through the amalgamation of Apsley Shire and the Municipality of Walcha.

The mayor of Walcha Shire Council is James Fermanis an unaligned politician.

== Main towns and villages ==
The towns and villages of Walcha Council include Walcha, Walcha Road, Niangala, Nowendoc and Woolbrook. Settlements include: Brackendale, Yarrowitch, Tia and Bendemeer.

== Demographics ==
Selected historical census data for Hay Shire local government area
Census year		2001	2006	2011	2016	2021
Population	Estimated residents on census night	3,102	▲3,187	▼3,021	▲3,092	▼3,016
Population	LGA rank in terms of size within New South Wales			120th	120th	120th
Population	% of New South Wales population	0.05%	0.05%	▼0.04%	0.04%	0.04%
Population	% of Australian population	0.02%	0.02%	▼0.01%	0.01%	0.01%
Cultural and language diversity						
Ancestry, top responses	Australian			36.5%	▼36.4%	▲43.9%
Ancestry, top responses	English			33.0%	▼28.8%	▲40.1%
Ancestry, top responses	Scottish			9.2%	▲9.3%	▲12.6%
Ancestry, top responses	Irish			9.1%	▼7.7%	▲11.9%
Ancestry, top responses	Australian Aboriginal			n/c	n/c	▲6.1%
Language, top responses (other than English)	Torres Strait Creole	n/c	n/c	n/c	n/c	▲0.3%
Language, top responses (other than English)	Dhanggatti	n/c	n/c	n/c	n/c	▲0.3%
Language, top responses (other than English)	German	n/c	n/c	▲0.3%	▼0.1%	▲0.2%
Language, top responses (other than English)	Mandarin	n/c	n/c	▲0.3%	▼0.2%	▼0.1%
Religious affiliation						
Religious affiliation, top responses	Anglican	44.8%	▼44.6%	▼42.4%	▼34.2%	▼30.3%
Religious affiliation, top responses	No Religion, so described	6.7%	▲8.3%	▲12.8%	▲18.0%	▲26.3%
Religious affiliation, top responses	Catholic	21.2%	▼20.6%	▲20.9%	▼19.4%	▼17.8%
Religious affiliation, top responses	Not stated	n/c	n/c	n/c	▲13.1%	▼10.5%
Religious affiliation, top responses	Presbyterian and Reformed	12.7%	▲13.3%	▼12.0%	▼9.9%	▼8.5%
Median weekly incomes						
Personal income	Median weekly personal income		A$377	A$459	A$577	A$690
Personal income	% of Australian median income		80.9%	▼79.5%	▲87.2%	▼85.7%
Family income	Median weekly family income		A$920	A$1,077	A$1,329	A$1,583
Family income	% of Australian median income		78.6%	▼72.7%	▲76.6%	▼74.7%
Household income	Median weekly household income		A$686	A$826	A$1,054	A$1,224
Household income	% of Australian median income		66.8%	▲66.9%	▲73.3%	▼70.1%

=== Incomes ===
According to the Australian Bureau of Statistics during 2003–04, there:

- were 927 wage and salary earners (ranked 146th in New South Wales and 470th in Australia, less than 0.1% of both New South Wales's 2,558,415 and Australia's 7,831,856)
- was a total income of $27,787,248 (around $28 million) (ranked 147th in New South Wales and 478th in Australia, less than 0.1% of both New South Wales's $107 billion and Australia's $304 billion)
- was an estimated average income per wage and salary earner of $29,975 (ranked 153rd in New South Wales and 517th in Australia, 72% of New South Wales's $41,407 and 77% of Australia's $38,820)
- was an estimated median income per wage and salary earner of $27,590 (ranked 154th in New South Wales and 517th in Australia, 78% of New South Wales's $35,479 and 81% of Australia's $34,149).

== Heritage listings ==
There are heritage listings in Walcha, Walcha Road, and in Woolbrook.

The heritage-listed sites in Walcha are:

- Ohio Homestead
- South Street: St Andrew's Anglican Church
- Thee Street: St Andrew's Anglican Rectory

The heritage-listed sites in Walcha Road are:

- Main Northern railway: Walcha Road railway station

The heritage-listed sites in Woolbrook are:

- Woolbrook rail bridge over Macdonald River

== Council ==
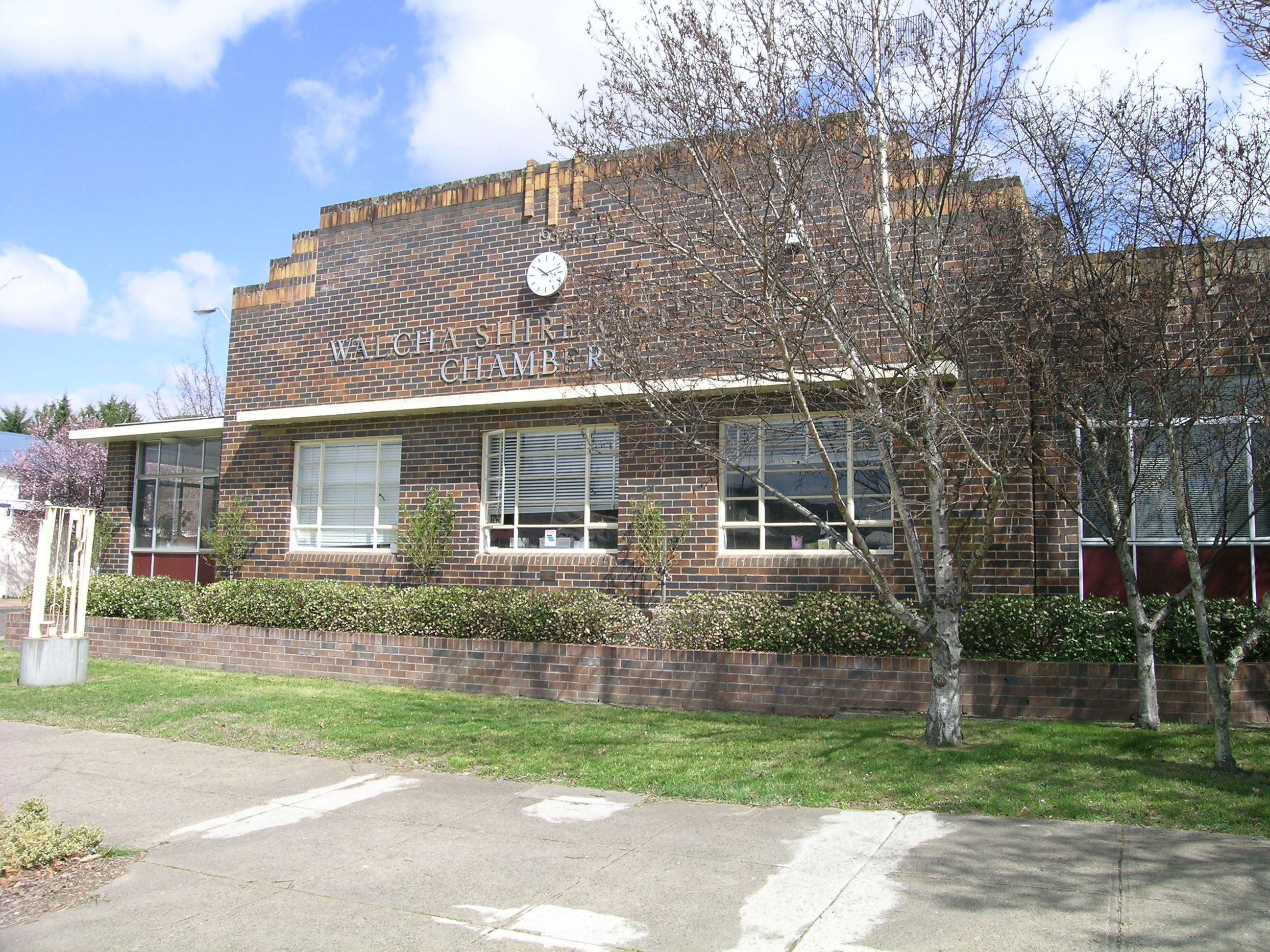
Walcha Shire Council

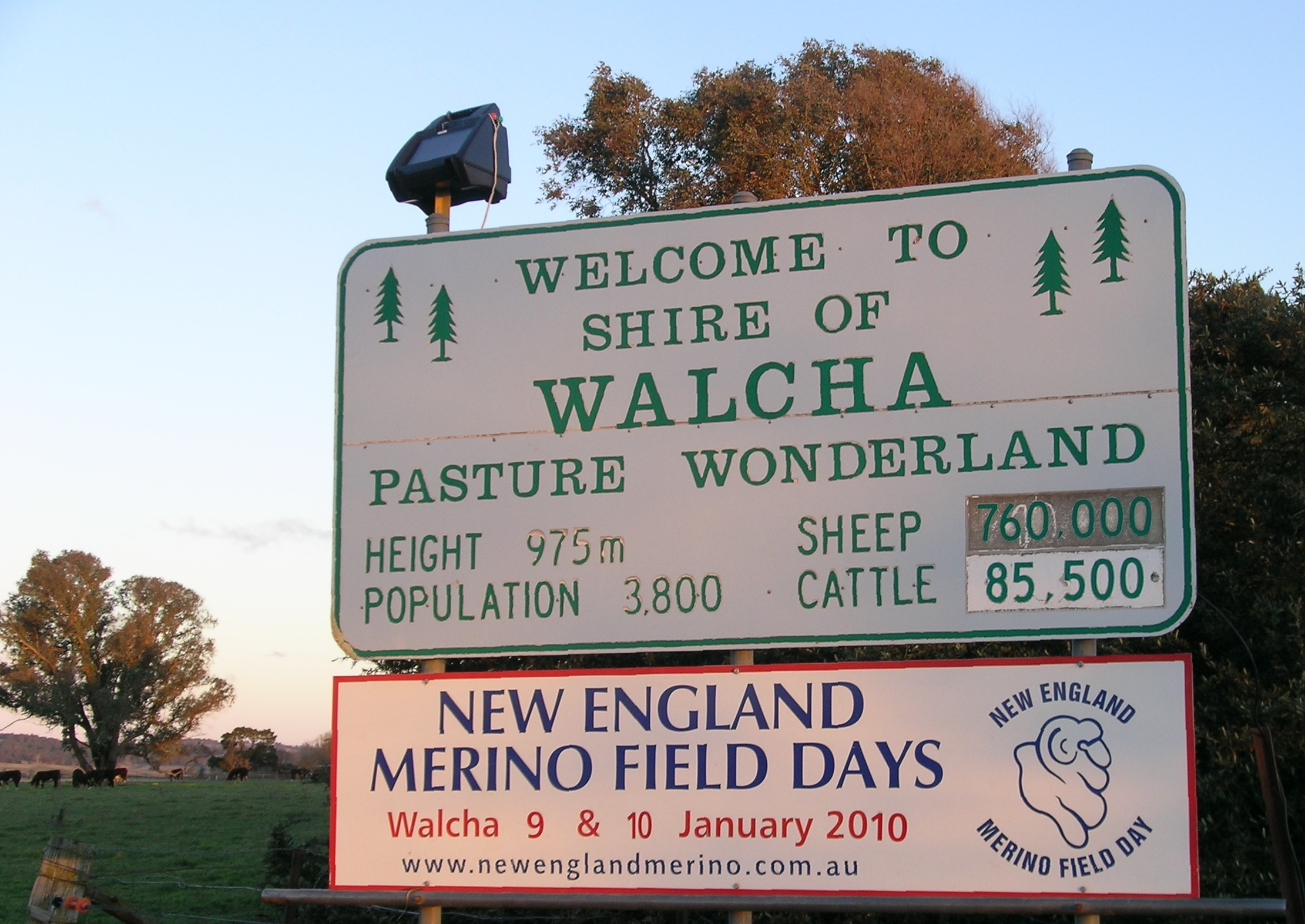
Welcome sign near the Shire boundary

=== Current composition and election method ===
Walcha Shire Council is composed of eight councillors elected proportionally to a single ward. All councillors are elected for a fixed four-year term of office. The mayor is by the councillors at the first meeting of the council.

At the 2012 local government elections, a referendum to abolish the four wards and elect councillors as one entire ward was defeated, with 56.1% voting against the resolution.

== Election results ==
=== 2024 ===
2024 New South Wales local elections: Walcha
Party	Candidate	Votes	%	±%
Independent	Eric Noakes (elected)	806	42.62	
Independent	Rachel Greig (elected)	225	11.90	
Independent	Hyde Thomson (elected)	167	8.83	
Independent	Gary Olrich (elected)	160	8.46	
Independent National	Glen O'Brien (elected)	122	6.45	
Independent	Stephen McCoy (elected)	107	5.66	
Independent	Adam Iuston (elected)	75	3.97	
Independent	Anne-Marie Pointing (elected)	71	3.75	
Independent	Holly Fletcher	42	2.22	
Independent	Michael Luchich	42	2.22	
Independent	Katrina Blomfield	34	1.80	
Independent	Warwick Fletcher	31	1.64	
Independent	Judith Salter	9	0.48	
Total formal votes		1,891	97.23	
Informal votes		54	2.77	
Turnout		1,945	83.76	

== History ==
The Shire of Apsley, its predecessor, was constituted by proclamation on 7 March 1906 and is located in the Vernon, Hawes, and Inglis counties, and comprises about 60 parishes. The area is 1,605,590 acres (6,497.6 km^{2}). The Shire of Walcha was constituted by the union of the Municipality of Walcha and the Shire of Apsley on 1 June 1955.

On 28 and 29 November 2008, torrential rain that caused severe flooding in the Apsley River and Macdonald River led to the area being declared a natural disaster area. Walcha Council estimated that it will cost approximately $1.7 million to repair damage caused to roads and infrastructure across the shire.

=== Proposed amalgamation ===
A 2015 review of local government boundaries recommended that the Walcha Shire merge with adjoining councils. The government considered two proposals. The first proposed a merger of Walcha Shire with the Tamworth Regional Council to form a new council with an area of 16,146 square kilometres (6,234 sq mi) and support a population of approximately 64,000. An alternative proposal, submitted by the Armidale Dumaresq Council on 1 March 2016, was for an amalgamation of the Armidale Dumaresq, Guyra, Uralla and Walcha councils. On 12 May 2016, the merger proposal was struck down – leaving Walcha Council to stand alone as a solo entity.
