= Brackendale, New South Wales =

Brackendale New South Wales
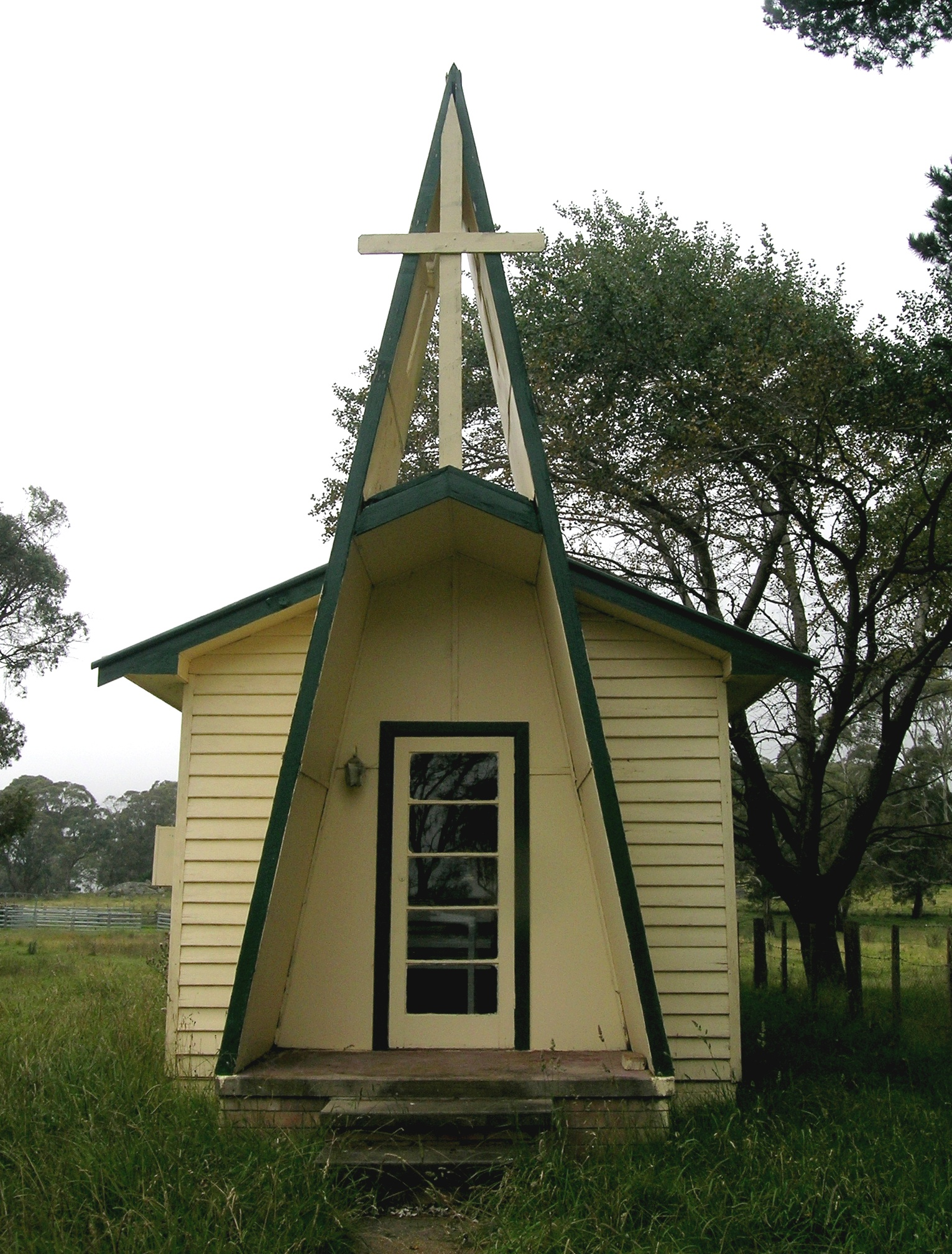
- Brackendale church

- Coordinates: 31°13′S 151°42′E
- Postcode(s): 2354
- Elevation: 1,229 m (4,032 ft)
- Location: 403 km (250 mi) N of Sydney; 167 km (104 mi) W of Port Macquarie; 120 km (75 mi) E of Tamworth; 29 km (18 mi) S of Walcha; 11 km (7 mi) SW of Tia
- LGA(s): Walcha Shire
- County: Vernon
- State electorate(s): Tamworth
- Federal division(s): New England

Brackendale is a rural locality situated on the Riamukka Road about 29 kilometres south of Walcha, New South Wales within the Walcha Shire local government area on the Northern Tablelands in Australia.

Brackendale was officially recognised as a locality in 1968 and currently comprises several houses and a church. The principal local industry is sheep and beef cattle breeding.

Orundumbi Post Office opened on 1 October 1892 and was renamed Brackendale in 1924.

The single-teacher Brackendale Public School closed in 1989.

In 2007, Brackendale and surrounding farms were quarantined following an outbreak of equine influenza.
