= St Andrew's Anglican Church, Walcha =

St Andrew's Anglican Church (former)
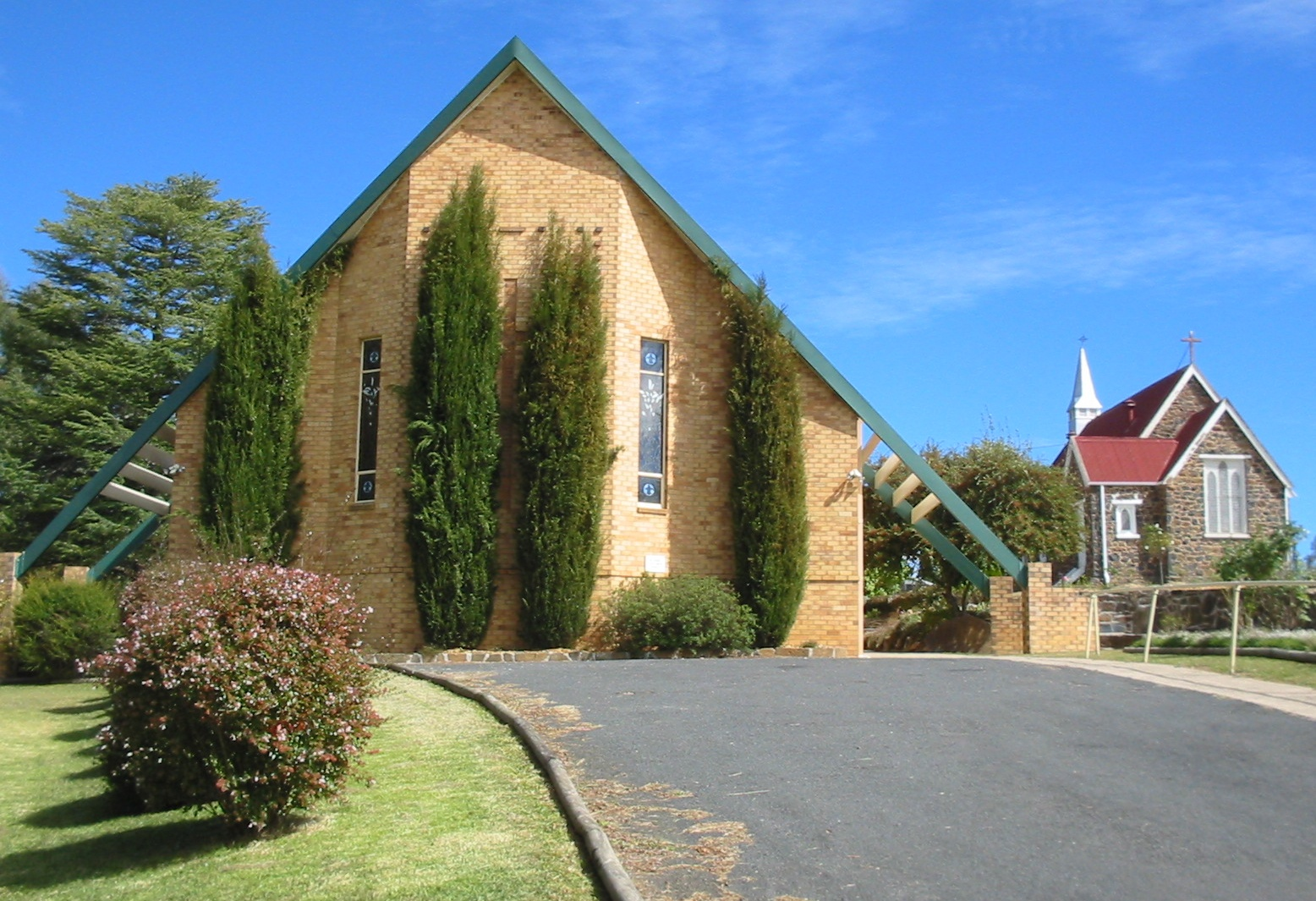
- The current (left in brick) and former (right in stone) St Andrew's Anglican churches in Walcha, pictured in 2005

- Location in New South Wales
- 30°59′02″S 151°35′26″E
- Location: South Street, Walcha, Walcha Shire, New South Wales
- Country: Australia
- Denomination: Anglican

History
- Status: Church
- Dedication: Saint Andrew

Architecture
- Functional status: Inactive
- Architectural type: Church
- Style: Victorian Rustic Gothic
- Years built: 1862–1866

New South Wales Heritage Register
- Official name: St. Andrew's Anglican Church (former); St Andrew's; St Andrews
- Type: State heritage (built)
- Designated: 2 April 1999
- Reference no.: 469
- Type: Historic site; former church

St Andrew's Anglican Church is a heritage-listed former Anglican church located at South Street, Walcha in the Walcha Shire, New South Wales, Australia. The site was added to the New South Wales State Heritage Register on 2 April 1999.

== History ==
St Andrew's Anglican Church was the third church to be built in Walcha, and is now the earliest church still standing on its original site. Construction commenced in 1862 with stone quarried from the demolished homestead at the Walcha station, Villa Wolka, and was completed in 1866. Originally known as St Paul's Church, it was renamed St Andrew's in the 1870s. A new church was built in 1963 and the adjacent parish hall was built in 1954.

== Description ==
St Andrew's Anglican Church is a Victorian Rustic Gothic–styled church that retains its original interior and contents. The church is regarded as a testament to the early pioneering families of the Walcha and New England district. The church is situated on a knoll above the town. The church is a granite building of coursed random rubble in a Rustic Gothic style, with pointed arched window frames within rectangular openings, and a pitched roof that was originally shingled and is not iron, as well as a timber shingled bellcote. The interior contains nine stained glass memorial windows dedicated to the early pioneers of the district.

== Heritage listing ==
St Andrew's Anglican Church in Walcha was listed on the New South Wales State Heritage Register on 2 April 1999. The building is classified by the NSW branch of the National Trust of Australia; and was listed on the now defunct Register of the National Estate.

== See also ==
- St Andrew's Anglican Rectory, Walcha
- List of former churches in Australia
