= Walcha Road, New South Wales =

Walcha Road New South Wales
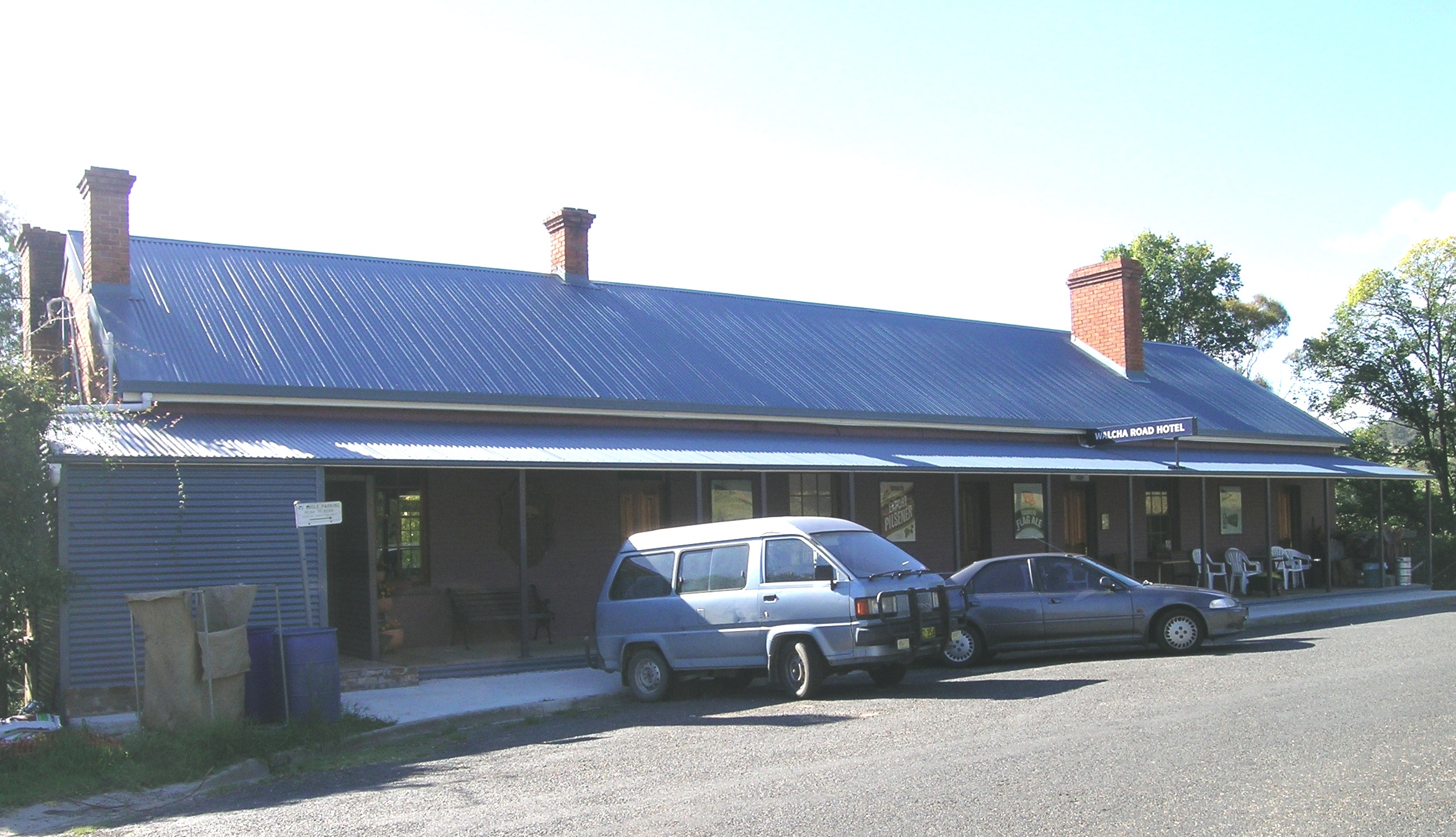
- The new hotel, Walcha Road

- Coordinates: 30°57′S 151°24′E
- Population: 20 (approx.)
- Postcode(s): 2354
- Elevation: 1,025 m (3,363 ft)
- Time zone: AEST (UTC+10)
  - Summer (DST): AEDT (UTC+11)
- Location: 445 km (277 mi) from Sydney
- LGA(s): Walcha Shire
- Region: Northern Tablelands
- County: Inglis
- State electorate(s): Tamworth
- Federal division(s): New England
Mean max temp	Mean min temp	Annual rainfall
?	?	800 mm 31.5 in

Walcha Road is a rural village with a population of about 20, located 19 kilometres (12 mi) west of Walcha in the Northern Tablelands of New South Wales, Australia.

The railway line through here from Sydney to Uralla was completed in 1882. Walcha Road Post Office opened on 16 November 1882 and closed in 1976.

Based on the Armidale train line, Walcha Road railway station served as the train stop for the Walcha district and as such carried a large volume of goods such as superphosphate, wool and livestock. During 1911 there were 8,748 bales of wool transported from here to Sydney. Livestock and goods are no longer carried and the old yards and sheds have been removed. Up until 1914, the trip to Walcha took about two hours by horses and a coach. Later a motor bus service operated along this route.

The historic hotel was burnt down in November 2004 and a new hotel was opened for meals in November 2007. A post office was opened here, but has been closed for many years. An old church located here is now a private home. Walcha Road now consists of a small number of homes and a one-man police station. The village does not have a public school and children typically attend schools in Walcha or Woolbrook.

About two point four kilometres (one point five miles) south east of the railway station is the natural feature of Crawfords Knob, timbered, with a bare summit consisting of an irregular arrangement of thousands of basalt columns.

== Heritage listings ==
Walcha Road has a number of heritage-listed sites, including:

- Main Northern railway: Walcha Road railway station
