= Dudley County =

Dudley New South Wales
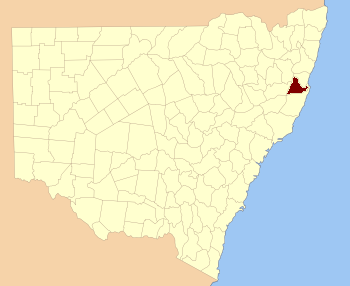
- Location in New South Wales
Lands administrative divisions around Dudley:
Clarke	Raleigh	Pacific Ocean
Vernon	Dudley	Pacific Ocean
Hawes	Macquarie	Pacific Ocean

Dudley County is one of the 141 cadastral divisions of New South Wales. Part of the southern border near the coast is the Apsley River.

Dudley County was named in honour of Dudley Ryder, Second Earl of Harrowby (1798–1882).

== Parishes within this county ==
A list of parishes found within this county; their LGA and mapping coordinates to the approximate centre of each location is as follows:

Parish	LGA	Coordinates
Bandi Bandi	Kempsey Shire Council	31°06′54″S 152°30′04″E
Barraganyatti	Kempsey Shire Council	30°51′54″S 152°56′04″E
Bellbrook	Kempsey Shire Council	30°46′54″S 152°33′04″E
Boonanghi	Kempsey Shire Council	31°04′54″S 152°36′04″E
Burragong	Kempsey Shire Council	30°57′54″S 152°42′04″E
Clarke	Kempsey Shire Council	30°59′54″S 152°20′04″E
Cliffs	Kempsey Shire Council	30°32′54″S 152°25′04″E
Clybucca	Kempsey Shire Council	30°55′54″S 152°58′04″E
Collombatti	Kempsey Shire Council	30°55′54″S 152°45′04″E
Comara	Kempsey Shire Council	30°37′54″S 152°22′04″E
Cooroobongatti	Kempsey Shire Council	30°58′54″S 152°56′04″E
Dudley	Kempsey Shire Council	31°04′54″S 152°25′04″E
Gordon	Kempsey Shire Council	30°46′54″S 152°37′04″E
Hickey	Kempsey Shire Council	30°53′14″S 152°39′50″E
Kalateenee	Kempsey Shire Council	31°05′54″S 152°47′04″E
Kemp	Kempsey Shire Council	31°03′54″S 152°30′04″E
Kullatine	Kempsey Shire Council	31°04′54″S 152°41′04″E
Loftus	Kempsey Shire Council	30°36′54″S 152°30′04″E
Macleay	Kempsey Shire Council	30°51′54″S 152°24′04″E
Nulla Nulla	Kempsey Shire Council	30°44′54″S 152°29′04″E
Oreen	Kempsey Shire Council	30°52′54″S 152°30′04″E
Panton	Kempsey Shire Council	30°56′54″S 152°26′04″E
Parrabel	Kempsey Shire Council	30°57′54″S 152°36′04″E
Pee Dee	Kempsey Shire Council	30°44′54″S 152°25′04″E
Stuart	Kempsey Shire Council	30°42′54″S 152°26′04″E
Tanban	Kempsey Shire Council	30°55′54″S 152°51′04″E
Uralgurra	Kempsey Shire Council	30°50′54″S 152°36′04″E
Vernon	Kempsey Shire Council	30°55′54″S 152°20′04″E
Warbro	Kempsey Shire Council	30°56′54″S 152°30′04″E
Warne	Kempsey Shire Council	30°49′54″S 152°20′04″E
Willawarrin	Kempsey Shire Council	30°55′54″S 152°38′04″E
Willi Willi	Kempsey Shire Council	30°59′54″S 152°26′04″E
Wittitrin	Kempsey Shire Council	31°07′21″S 152°40′56″E
Wolseley	Kempsey Shire Council	30°37′54″S 152°25′04″E
Yarrabandini	Kempsey Shire Council	30°58′54″S 152°49′04″E
Yarrahapinni	Kempsey Shire Council	30°48′54″S 152°58′04″E
Yarravel	Kempsey Shire Council	31°01′54″S 152°44′04″E
