= Bandi Bandi, New South Wales =

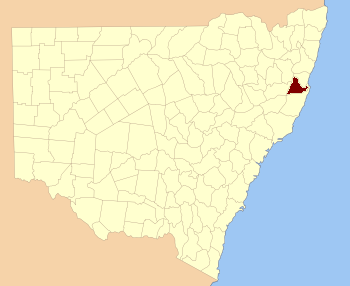
Dudley NSW.

Bandi Bandi located at 31°06′54″S 152°30′04″E in the hinterland behind Kempsey, New South Wales is a civil parish of Dudley County. and rural locality in the Kempsey Shire Council Area of the midnorth coast of New South Wales, Australia.

Although there is some agriculture in Bandi Bandi most of the locality is occupied by Willi Willi National Park.
