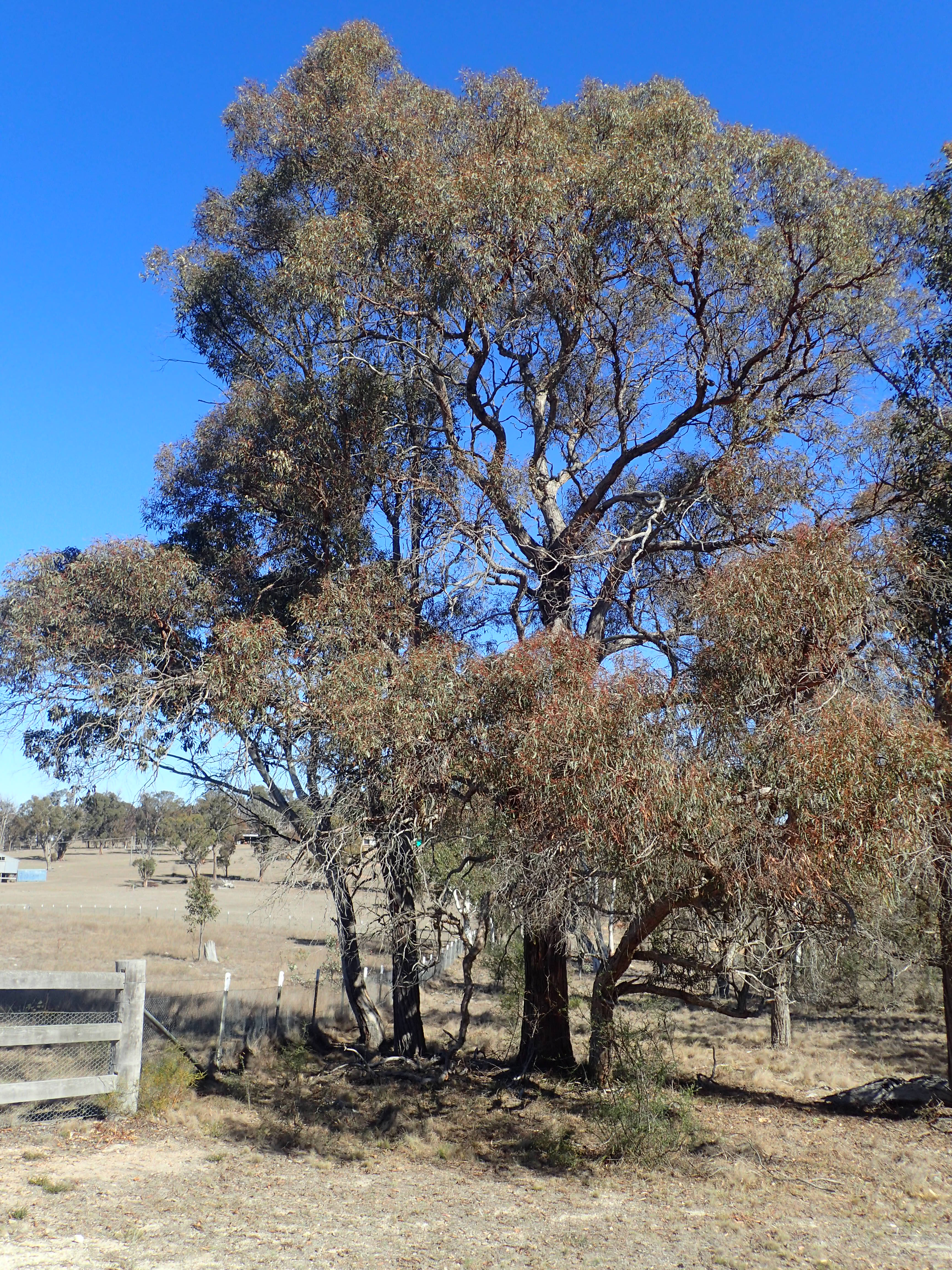
- Eucalyptus nicholii, east of Armidale

Conservation status
- Vulnerable (IUCN 3.1)

- Vulnerable (EPBC Act)

Scientific classification
- Kingdom: Plantae
- Clade: Tracheophytes
- Clade: Angiosperms
- Clade: Eudicots
- Clade: Rosids
- Order: Myrtales
- Family: Myrtaceae
- Genus: Eucalyptus
- Species: E. nicholii

Binomial name
- Eucalyptus nicholii Maiden & Blakely
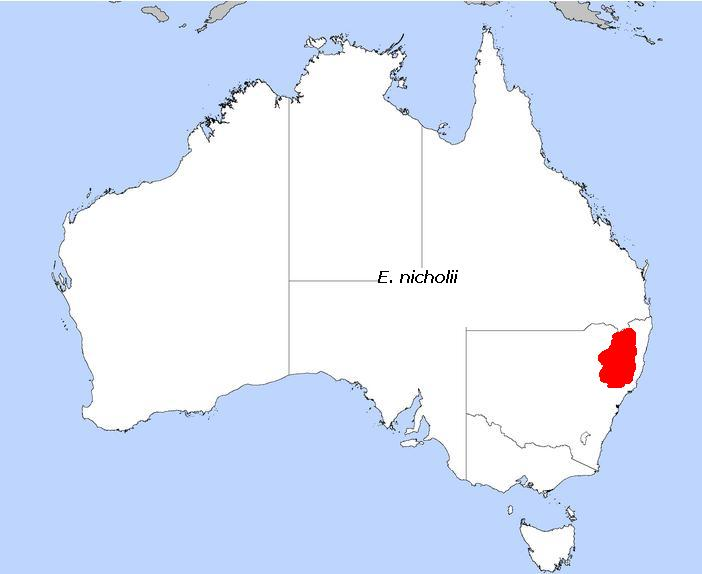
- E. nicholii, field distribution

Synonyms
- Eucalyptus acaciaeformis var. linearis H.Deane & Maiden orth. var.; Eucalyptus acaciiformis var. linearis H.Deane & Maiden; Eucalyptus nicholi Maiden & Blakely orth. var.

= Eucalyptus nicholii =

Narrow-leaved black peppermint

Species of eucalyptus

Eucalyptus nicholii, commonly known as the narrow-leaved black peppermint or willow peppermint, is a species of small to medium-sized tree that is endemic to New South Wales. It has thick, rough, fibrous bark on the trunk and branches, small, narrow adult leaves, flower buds arranged in groups of seven, white flowers and small, hemispherical, bell-shaped or conical fruit.

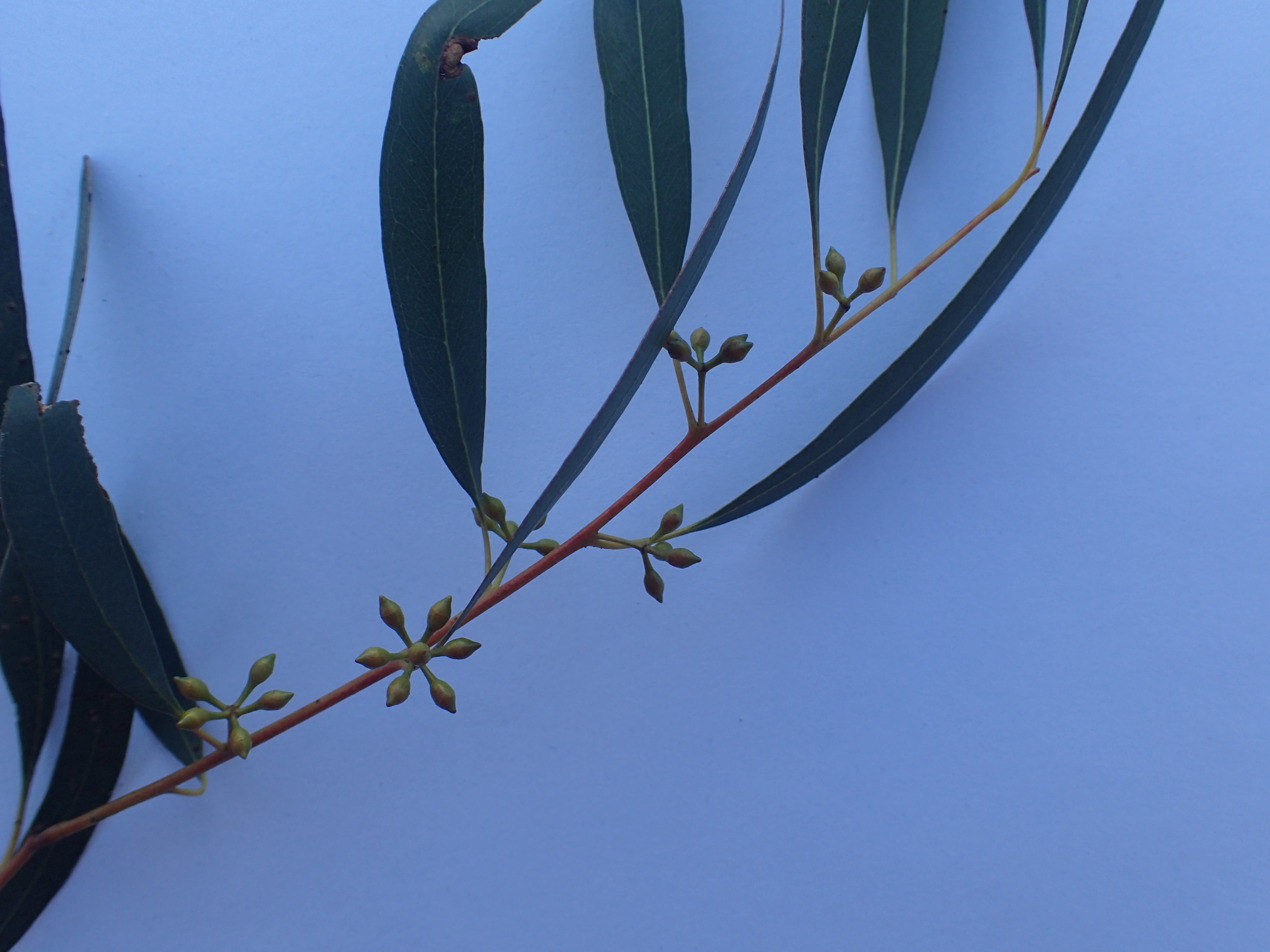
Flower buds

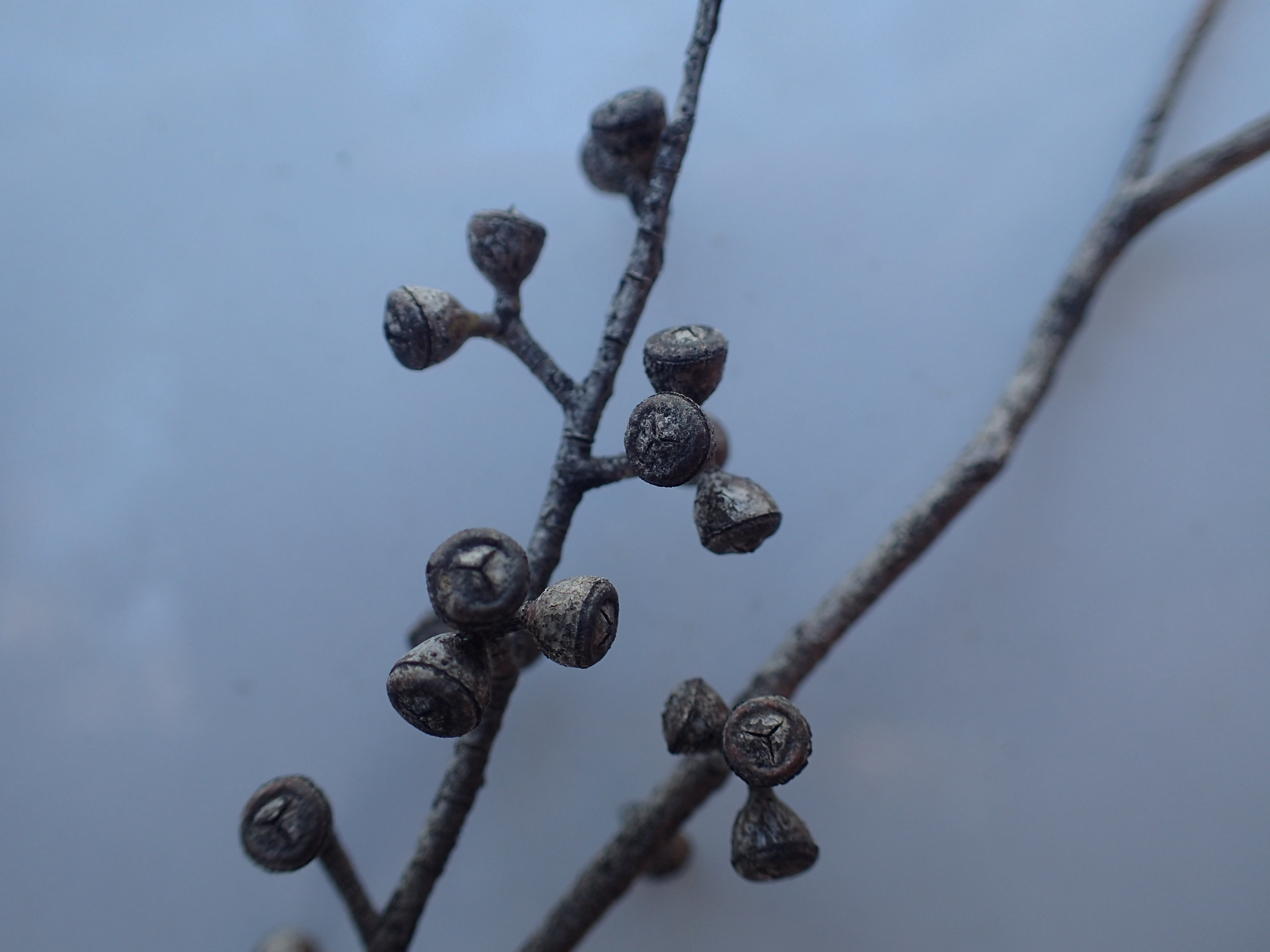
Fruit

== Description ==
Eucalyptus nicholii is a tree that typically grows to a height of 15–18 m (49–59 ft) and forms a lignotuber. It has thick, rough, fibrous, yellowish-brown to grey-brown bark with red-brown underlayers. The bark is coarsely fissured on the trunk and branches, but the outer branches sometimes have smooth bark that is shed in short ribbons. Young plants and coppice regrowth have dull, greyish, linear to narrow lance-shaped leaves 20–64 mm (0.79–2.52 in) long and 2–10 mm (0.079–0.394 in) wide. Adult leaves are the same dull greyish green on both sides, narrow lance-shaped, 60–140 mm (2.4–5.5 in) long and 5–12 mm (0.20–0.47 in) wide on a petiole 5–15 mm (0.20–0.59 in) long. The flower buds are arranged in leaf axils in groups of seven on an unbranched peduncle 3–8 mm (0.12–0.31 in) long, the individual buds on pedicels 2–4 mm (0.079–0.157 in) long. Mature buds are oval, 3–5 mm (0.12–0.20 in) long and 2–3 mm (0.079–0.118 in) wide with a conical operculum. Flowering occurs from late summer to early autumn and the flowers are white. The fruit is a woody hemispherical, bell-shaped or conical capsule 3–4 mm (0.12–0.16 in) long and 3–5 mm (0.12–0.20 in) wide with the valves protruding slightly above the rim of the fruit.

== Taxonomy and naming ==
Eucalyptus nicholii was first formally described in 1929 by Joseph Maiden and William Blakely in Maiden's book, A Critical Revision of the genus Eucalyptus. The specific epithet honours Maiden's private secretary and "Chief Clerk, Botanic Gardens", Richard Nicol.

== Distribution and habitat ==
The narrow-leaved black peppermint grows in shallow, relatively infertile soils overlying shale and slate bedrock usually as part of grassy or sclerophyll woodlands, in association with Eucalyptus andrewsii and Eucalyptus caliginosa. Its distribution is limited to the Northern Tablelands, New South Wales, particularly in the Walcha to Tenterfield, area and to the east. The species is sparsely distributed, but most commonly occurs in the central areas of its range.

== Conservation status ==
This eucalyptus is listed as "vulnerable" under the Australian Government Environment Protection and Biodiversity Conservation Act 1999 and the New South Wales Government Biodiversity Conservation Act 2016. Most specimens occur on private property or on roadsides and few are conserved in nature reserves. The main threats to the species are land clearing and habitat fragmentation, inappropriate fire regimes, grazing by livestock and feral goats, road maintenance and collection of firewood. The entire population is known from fewer than 40 localities, with most not reserved in national parks or state forests. The IUCN Red List assesses the species as Vulnerable.

== Use in horticulture ==
This tree is very widely planted as an ornamental in southeastern Australia, the fine, dense foliage being particularly attractive. It was often recommended as small enough to be suitable for planting on suburban blocks. However, when well-watered it sometimes grows inconveniently tall, and may shed large branches. Hence it sometimes appears on lists of problematic trees for suburban gardens.

== See also ==
- List of Eucalyptus species
