= St Andrew's Anglican Rectory, Walcha =

St Andrew's Anglican Rectory (former)
- Location within New South Wales Location within Australia
- 30°59′01″S 151°35′09″E
- Location: Thee Street, Walcha, Walcha Shire, New South Wales, Australia

Site notes
- Architect: John Horbury Hunt

New South Wales Heritage Register
- Official name: St. Andrew's Rectory (former); St Andrew's Rectory
- Type: State heritage (built)
- Designated: 2 April 1999
- Reference no.: 295
- Type: Presbytery/Rectory/Vicarage/Manse
- Category: Religion

The St Andrew's Rectory is a heritage-listed former Anglican clergy house located at Thee Street, Walcha in the Walcha Shire, New South Wales, Australia. It is also known as St. Andrews Rectory (former) and St Andrews Rectory. It was added to the New South Wales State Heritage Register on 2 April 1999.

== Description ==
Designed by John Horbury Hunt, the rectory has a traditional pitched corrugated iron roof (originally timber shingled) supported on face brick walls and timber verandah to two sides supported on posts having trefoil decorated timber brackets. Many Hunt details are in evidence such as the large boarded roof gable, elaborate hall screens, central lobby lit by large sky light and large brick chimneys. A pleasant country garden consisting of planted beds and mature trees surrounds the house.

== Heritage listing ==
St Andrew's Rectory was listed on the New South Wales State Heritage Register on 2 April 1999. On 25 March 1986 the building was listed on the now defunct Register of the National Estate.

== See also ==
- St Andrew's Anglican Church, Walcha
