= Vernon County, New South Wales =

Vernon New South Wales
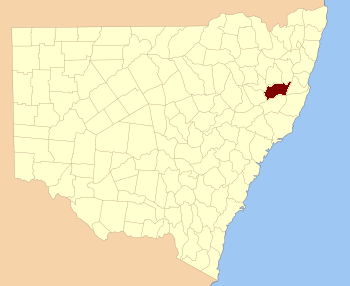
- Location in New South Wales
Lands administrative divisions around Vernon:
Inglis	Sandon	Clarke
Parry	Vernon	Dudley & Macquarie County
Parry	Hawes	Macquarie

Vernon County is one of the 141 cadastral divisions of New South Wales, Australia. The Macleay River is part of the border in the north-east. It includes Walcha.

Vernon County was named in honour of George John Venables-Vernon, 5th Baron Vernon (1803–1866).

== Parishes within this county ==
A full list of parishes found within this county; their current LGA and mapping coordinates to the approximate centre of each location is as follows:

Parish	LGA	Coordinates
Aberbaldie	Walcha Council	31°07′54″S 151°25′04″E
Andy	Walcha Council	31°08′54″S 151°39′04″E
Apsley	Walcha Council	31°03′54″S 151°39′04″E
Benditi	Walcha Council	31°00′54″S 151°59′04″E
Bergen-Op-Zoom	Walcha Council	30°56′54″S 151°30′04″E
Boulton	Walcha Council	31°00′54″S 151°29′04″E
Branga	Walcha Council	31°13′54″S 151°33′04″E
Brassey	Walcha Council	31°14′54″S 152°06′04″E
Cobrabald	Walcha Council	31°09′54″S 151°32′04″E
Cochrane	Armidale Regional Council	30°44′54″S 152°15′04″E
Denne	Walcha Council	31°06′54″S 151°55′04″E
Ella	Walcha Council	30°55′54″S 151°54′04″E
Emu	Walcha Council	31°01′54″S 151°47′04″E
Enfield	Walcha Council	31°12′54″S 151°56′04″E
Europambela	Walcha Council	30°55′54″S 151°41′04″E
Fenwick	Walcha Council	31°02′54″S 151°51′04″E
Fitzroy	Walcha Council	30°55′54″S 152°11′04″E
Fletcher	Walcha Council	31°21′54″S 151°31′04″E
Gill	Walcha Council	30°51′54″S 151°53′04″E
Glen Morrison	Walcha Council	31°13′51″S 151°28′18″E
Halloran	Walcha Council	31°03′54″S 151°34′04″E
Ingleba	Walcha Council	31°21′54″S 151°28′04″E
Junction	Walcha Council	31°03′54″S 152°00′04″E
Kangaroo Flat	Walcha Council	31°07′54″S 152°08′04″E
Kunderang	Kempsey Shire Council	30°51′54″S 152°15′04″E
Loch	Walcha Council	31°04′54″S 152°15′04″E
Macleay	Walcha Council	30°49′54″S 151°58′04″E
Moona	Walcha Council	31°02′54″S 151°58′04″E
Mooraback	Walcha Council	31°01′54″S 152°08′04″E
Norton	Walcha Council	31°05′54″S 151°47′04″E
Ohio	Walcha Council	30°52′54″S 151°32′04″E
Oorundunby	Walcha Council	31°07′54″S 151°33′04″E
Salway	Walcha Council	31°17′54″S 151°38′04″E
Shelving	Walcha Council	31°12′54″S 151°50′04″E
St Clair	Walcha Council	31°08′54″S 151°43′04″E
St Leonard	Walcha Council	31°11′54″S 151°35′04″E
Styx	Walcha Council	30°55′54″S 152°04′04″E
Tia	Walcha Council	31°13′54″S 151°43′04″E
Tiara	Walcha Council	31°05′54″S 151°52′04″E
Trinidad	Walcha Council	31°05′54″S 151°59′04″E
Walcha	Walcha Council	31°00′54″S 151°36′04″E
Waterloo	Walcha Council	31°00′54″S 151°42′04″E
Winterbourne	Walcha Council	30°49′54″S 151°48′04″E
Yarrowitch	Walcha Council	31°13′54″S 151°59′04″E
