= Walcha, New South Wales =

Town in Australia

Walcha
- Town
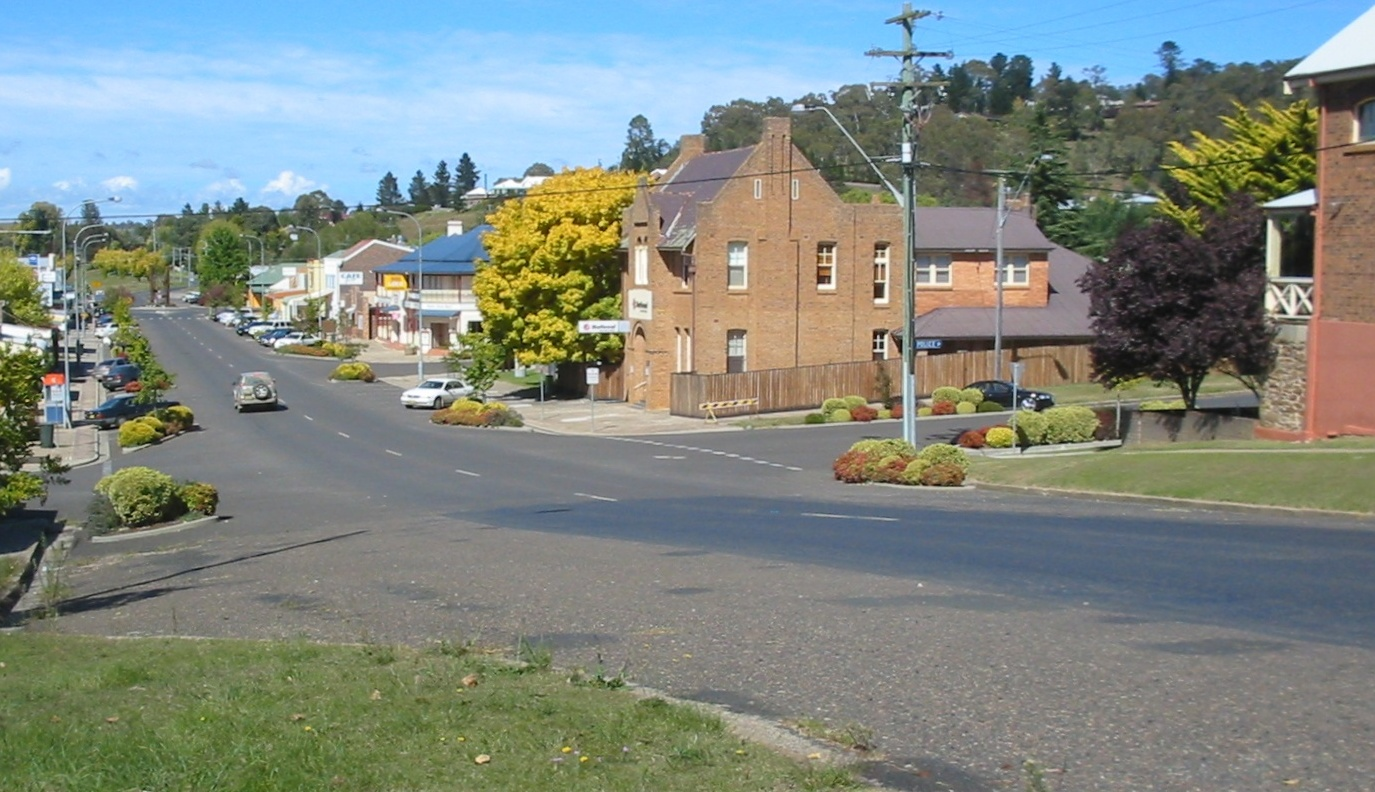
- Derby Street, Walcha, 2007

- Coordinates: 30°59′S 151°36′E
- Country: Australia
- State: New South Wales
- Region: Northern Tablelands
- LGA: Walcha Shire
- Location: 425 km (264 mi) from Sydney; 91 km (57 mi) from Tamworth; 163 km (101 mi) from Port Macquarie
- Established: 1852

Government
  - State electorate: Tamworth
  - Federal division: New England
- Elevation: 1,067.0 m (3,500.7 ft)

Population
  - Total: 1,369 (UCL 2021)
- Time zone: UTC+10 (AEST)
  - Summer (DST): UTC+11 (AEDT)
- Postcode: 2354
- County: Vernon
- Parish: Walcha
- Mean max temp: 19.2 °C (66.6 °F)
- Mean min temp: 5.3 °C (41.5 °F)
- Annual rainfall: 808.6 mm (31.83 in)

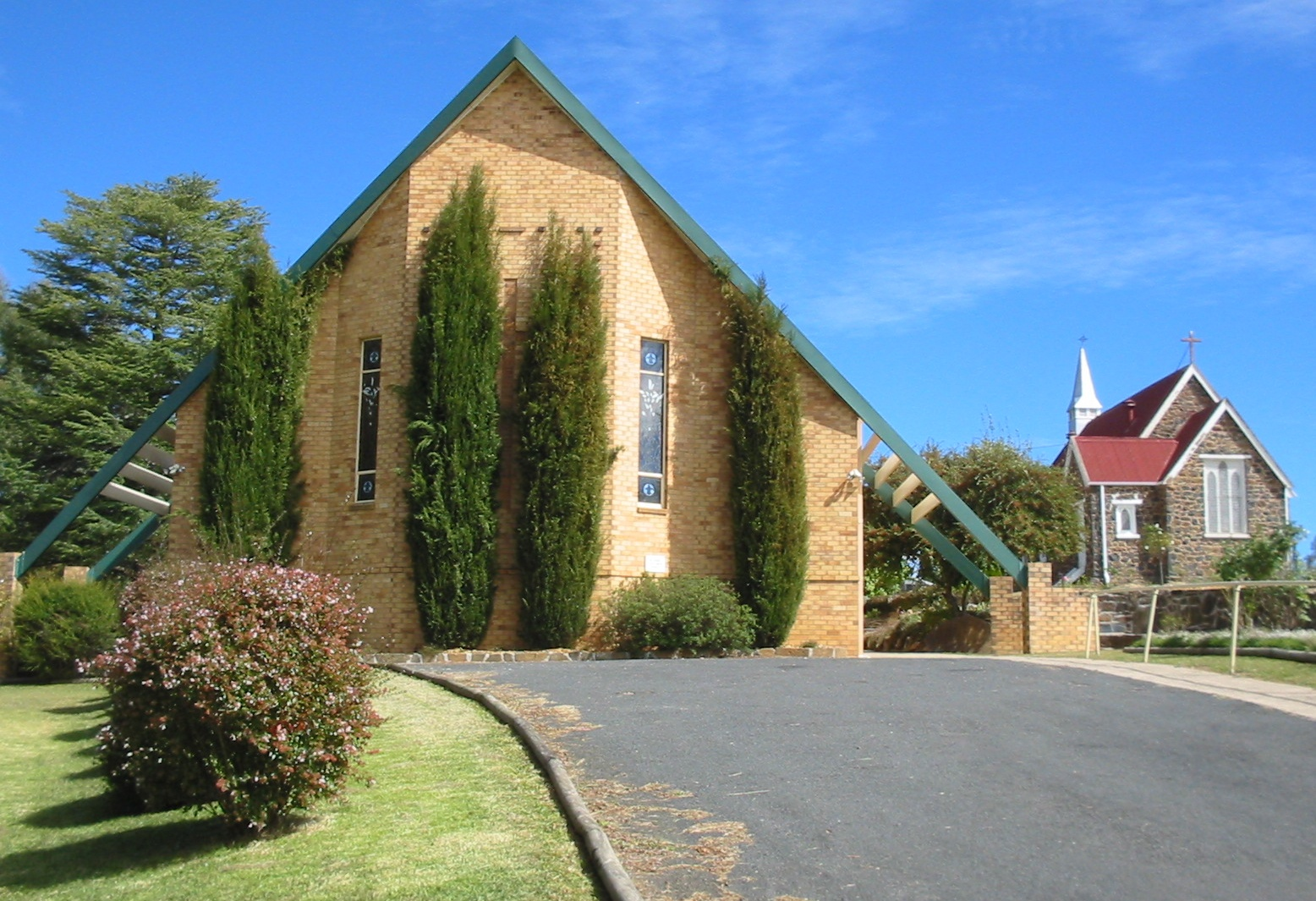
The new and old Anglican churches at Walcha

Walcha (/ˈwɒlkə/) is a town at the south-eastern edge of the Northern Tablelands, New South Wales, Australia.

The town, which is the seat of Walcha Shire, is 425 kilometres (264 mi) by road from Sydney, at the intersection of the Oxley Highway and Thunderbolts Way. The Apsley River passes through the town to tumble over the Apsley Falls before joining the Macleay River further on. The river used to cause flooding in the town, but a levee bank has been constructed to alleviate the problem. At the 2021 census, Walcha had a population of 1369 people.

The Main North railway line runs 20.7 kilometres (12.9 mi) to the west, where there is a settlement called Walcha Road. Walcha Road railway station is served by the daily NSW TrainLink Xplorer service between Sydney and Armidale. The railway line bypassed Walcha because of the steep grades over the Great Dividing Range.

== History ==
The area was occupied by the Dhanggati (or Dunghutti) People for at least 6000 years prior to European settlement. The tablelands had places for ceremonies and trade of goods, and there are traces of bora grounds near Walcha. In the colder months, tribes retreated to the gorge country to the east, where fish and animals were plentiful.

In 1818, John Oxley was the first European person to explore the area and the falls which were later to be named Apsley Falls.

Hamilton Collins Sempill was the first settler in the New England area when he took up the 'Wolka' run in 1832, establishing slab huts where 'Langford' now stands. Other early runs around the district were Bergen-op-Zoom (1834), Ohio (1836), Europambela (c.1836), Surveyor's Creek (1836), Emu Creek (c.1837), Ingalba (1837), Orandumbie (1837), Tiara (1837) and Winterbourne (1837). A severe depression from 1841 to 1843, and low demand for wool created hardship for many of these early settlers. In 1848 Walcha run is recorded as being 64,000 acres (260 km^{2}) and in the lease of David Lanarch. During 1854 Walcha was sold to Rundle and Dangar who held the mortgage for Jamison and Connal. Later John Fletcher acquired Walcha and moved from Branga Plains to Oorundumby. After being sold in 1905, Oorundumby was resumed for soldier settlement in 1947 and subdivided into 22 holdings.

Not long after Sempill's arrival, in 1834, John McLean took up a run he called Bergen op Zoom, reportedly named in tribute to relatives Allen and Francis McLean, who had assisted the Dutch in the defence of that town against the French in the War of the Sixth Coalition. When McLean died in 1851, his family sold Bergen Op Zoom to Shropshire-born artist Edward Baker-Boulton, who with his brothers already owned extensive runs in the Wellington district. Baker-Boulton was typical of the absentee owners of large stations, living for the most part in Sydney or 'back home' in the UK, the station being run as a partnership with David Bell, until 1874 when Bell left to take over management of his own holdings in the district. Baker-Boulton then returned from England to manage the station hands-on, and died there, aged 83, in 1895, where he is buried in the Walcha Cemetery. He was a noted artist of the early Colonial period whose works are largely forgotten now. Edith, the eldest daughter of his second wife, Rachel Gwyn, who visited Walcha in 1890, was the mother of renowned English children's author, Arthur Ransome, whose bucolic Swallows and Amazons series is still in print in the 21st century. The sixth book in the series, Pigeon Post, was the inaugural winner of the Carnegie Medal in 1936.

A "wool" road to Port Macquarie (the Oxley Highway) was under construction in 1842 for the transportation of wool from New England to the coast. Walcha Post Office opened on 1 July 1850. The mail arrived from Macdonald River (now Bendemeer). Walcha was gazetted as a village site in 1852, when town allotments were sold, with annual sales following. At that time there was a blacksmith's shop, a general store and a flour mill. A Roman Catholic chapel was erected in 1854, a police station and the first Presbyterian church was built in 1857 and the Walcha Central School in 1859.

In 1861 the population was recorded at 355 and the Anglican church was built in 1862 of stone taken from the demolished homestead, 'Villa Walcha', erected on the Wolka run in the 1840s. The old church has fine stained-glass windows which bear tribute to some of the town's pioneers.

The population dropped in the 1860s but the town soon began to grow for two reasons: firstly, red cedar getters were active in the area's rainforests by about 1870. Gold was discovered near Walcha in the 1870s at Glen Morrison, Tia, The Cells River and Nowendoc. Antimony, copper, graphite, manganese, silver and high quality slate was also mined in the district.

On 5 April 1878 Walcha was proclaimed a town, when it was gazetted, the boundaries defined and a courthouse was built. A rail link to Sydney, Tamworth, Woolbrook and Uralla opened at Walcha Road in 1882. The town became a municipality in 1889. On 19 March 1890 the Walcha Pastoral & Agricultural Association was formed. This annual show has excellent exhibits of livestock, produce, vegetables, flowers, wool and handicrafts. Walcha Cottage Hospital founded in 1890 and was situated on the southern hill in South Street. The Shire of Apsley was constituted by proclamation on 7 March 1906. It is in the counties of Vernon, Hawes, and Inglis and comprises about 60 parishes. The area is 1,605,590 acres (6,497.6 km^{2}). The Shire of Walcha was constituted by the Union of the Municipality and the Shire of Apsley as from on 1 June 1955.

Other district villages are: Niangala, Nowendoc, Woolbrook, Brackendale, Glen Morrison, Ingalba, Tia and Yarrowitch.

History was made at Walcha in 1950 when a Tiger Moth was the first aircraft used to spread superphosphate by air in Australia. The "super" was dropped on Mirani and other landholders soon followed suit to greatly increase the livestock carrying capacity of the district.

In 1992 the Walcha Telecottage was established to become the first telecentre established in Australia. The Telecottage is a not for profit community with the latest information communication facilities, in order to activate interactions between the local communities and to create employment opportunities. This Telecottage carries out not only the fundamental types of work such as job training, remote education, secretarial service and data analysis, but also Internet access service for individuals and small companies. Walcha Telecottage produces a weekly community newsletter, the Apsley Advocate, which is free and delivered to over 1,600 commercial and private addresses.

== Heritage listings ==
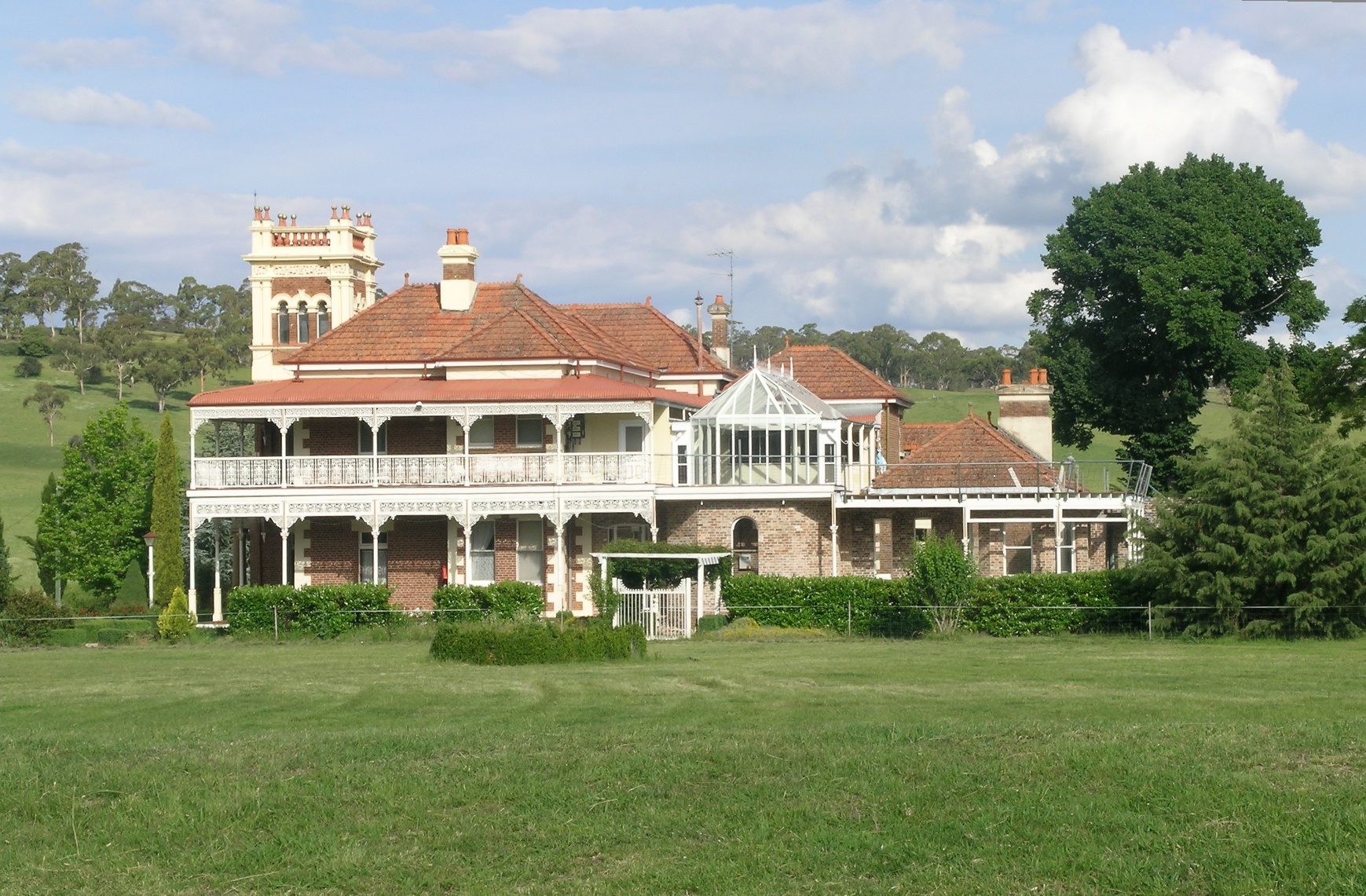
The Register of the National Estate listed, Langford, Thunderbolts Way, Walcha, NSW

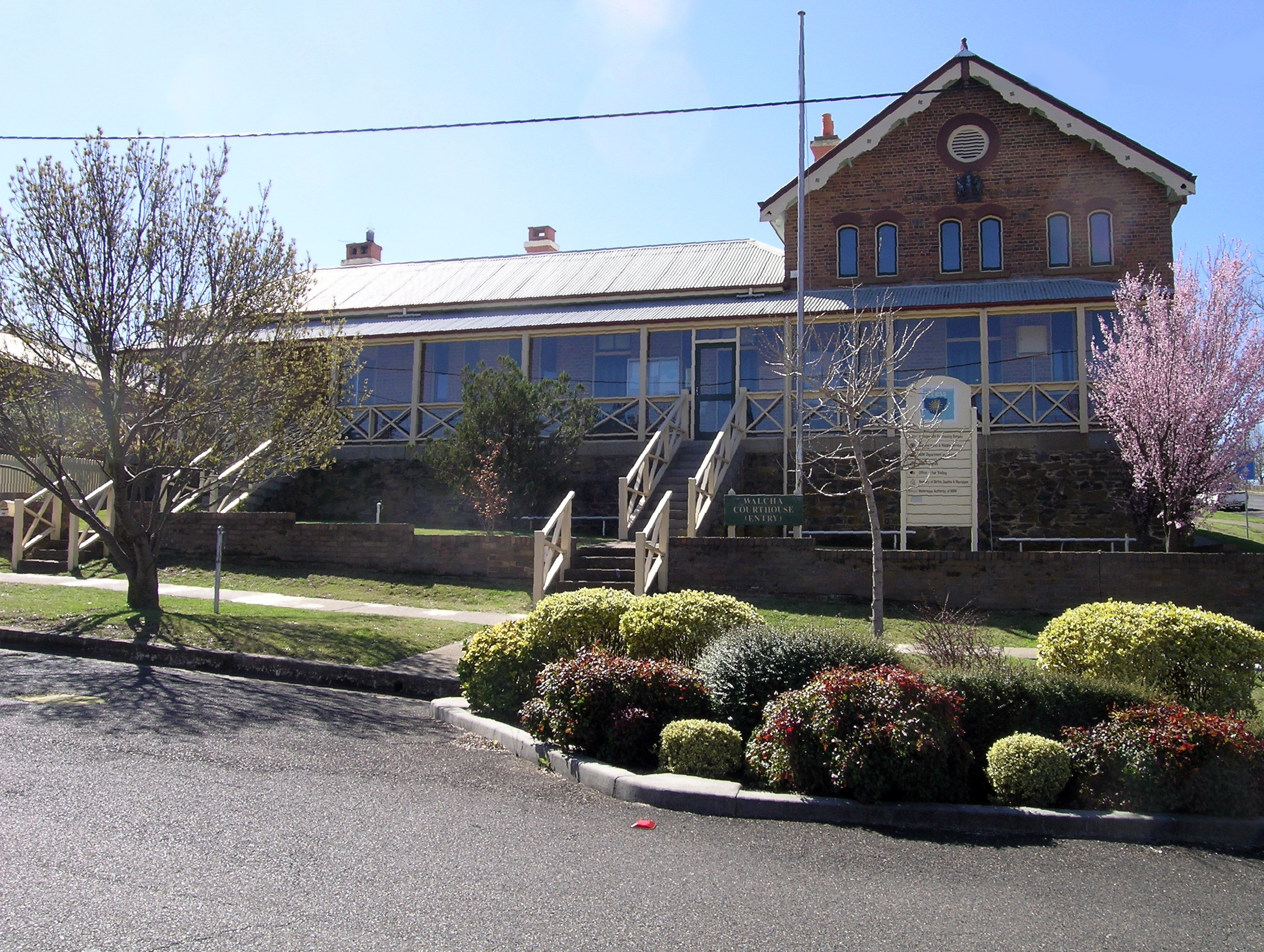
Walcha Court House

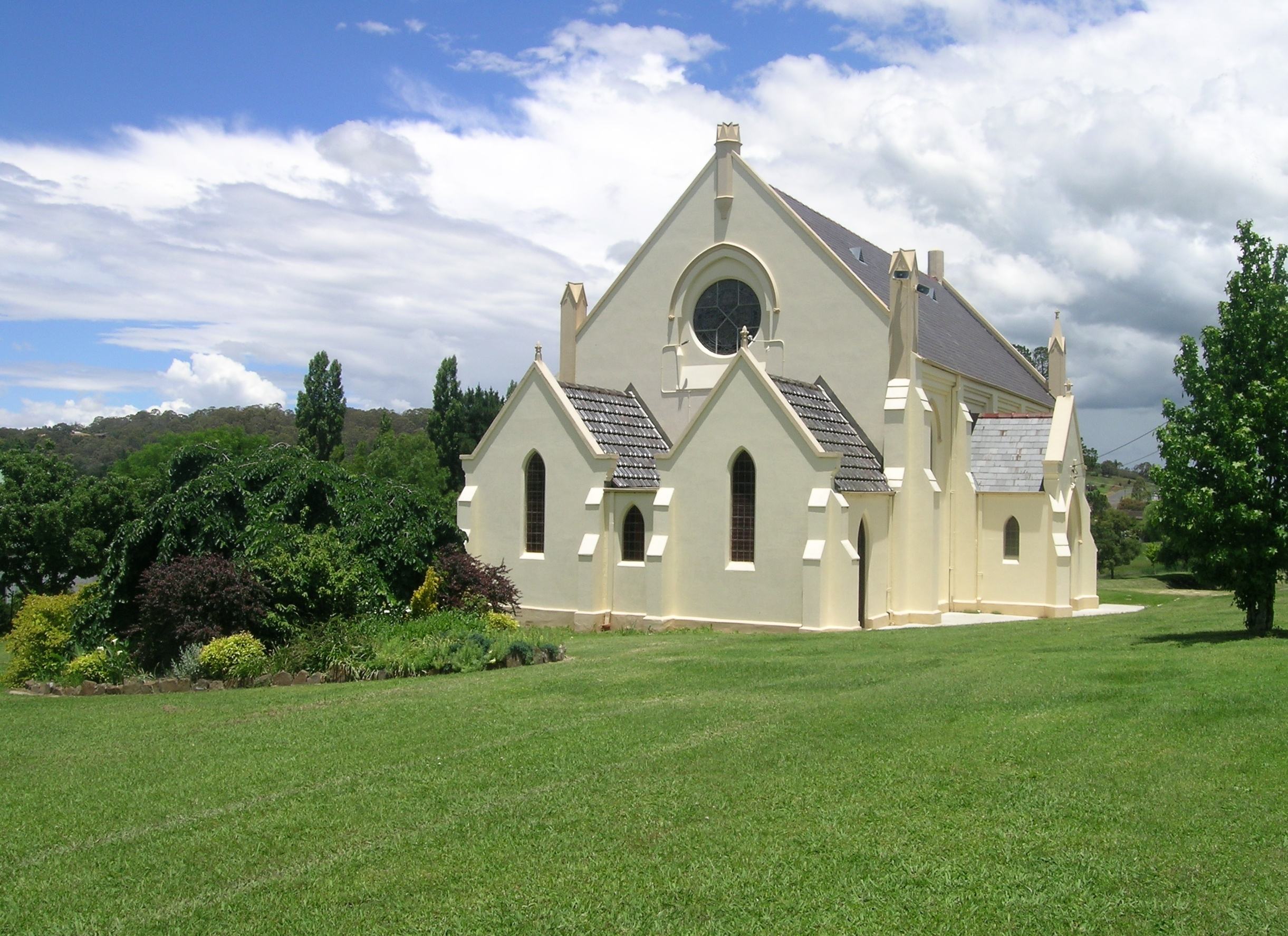
The Register of the National Estate listed, St Paul's Presbyterian Church, Walcha, NSW

Walcha has a number of heritage-listed sites, including:

- Ohio Homestead
- South Street: St Andrew's Anglican Church
- Thee Street: St Andrew's Rectory
- Main Northern railway: Walcha Road railway station

During 2008 Walcha recorded one of the state's highest rises in property values at 20 per cent over the last 5 years, according to a report from Australian Property Monitors.

The local buildings and objects of natural, indigenous and historic significance listed on the Register of the National Estate includes the following:

- Apsley Gorge National Park (1977 boundary), Oxley Highway
- Betts Farm, Irish Town, Thunderbolts Way
- Central Eastern Rainforest Reserves, now known as the Gondwana Rainforests of Australia (Hastings-Macleay Group)
- Europambela Homestead including outbuildings, grounds and Cemetery, Moona Plains Road
- Langford Homestead, Garden and Cemetery, Nowendoc Road
- Ohio Homestead, Ohio Road
- Rowleys Creek Gulf Nature Reserve
- St Andrews Anglican Church (former), South Street
- St Andrews Rectory (former) including garden and trees, Fitzroy Street
- St Paul's Presbyterian Church and Fletcher Memorial Hall, Hill Street
- The Hole Creek Nature Reserve (1977 boundary), Winterbourne Road
- Walcha Courthouse, Apsley Street

== Climate ==
Like most of the Northern Tablelands, Walcha's climate can be described as having an oceanic climate (Köppen climate classification: Cfb), but with a relatively strong 'continental' influence and characteristics; with a daily temperature range from −2.0 °C (28.4 °F) to 11.9 °C (53.4 °F) in July, and from 12.1 °C (53.8 °F) to 25.2 °C (77.4 °F) in February. Average annual rainfall is 808.6 millimetres (31.83 in). Winter snow and frost is not unusual. The town's highest and lowest recorded temperatures are 35.6 °C (96.1 °F) and −12.8 °C (9.0 °F), though temperature records were only kept between 1957 and 1975.

Climate data for Walcha Post Office (1957–1975); 1,050 m AMSL; 30.99° S, 151.59° E
Month	Jan	Feb	Mar	Apr	May	Jun	Jul	Aug	Sep	Oct	Nov	Dec	Year
Record high °C (°F)	35.4 (95.7)	33.9 (93.0)	32.2 (90.0)	28.9 (84.0)	22.5 (72.5)	18.9 (66.0)	19.0 (66.2)	21.7 (71.1)	27.2 (81.0)	30.0 (86.0)	34.2 (93.6)	35.6 (96.1)	35.6 (96.1)
Mean maximum °C (°F)	31.9 (89.4)	30.6 (87.1)	28.5 (83.3)	25.1 (77.2)	20.6 (69.1)	17.5 (63.5)	16.6 (61.9)	18.2 (64.8)	22.4 (72.3)	26.7 (80.1)	29.0 (84.2)	30.6 (87.1)	33.5 (92.3)
Mean daily maximum °C (°F)	25.3 (77.5)	25.2 (77.4)	23.1 (73.6)	20.3 (68.5)	15.5 (59.9)	12.7 (54.9)	11.9 (53.4)	12.7 (54.9)	16.2 (61.2)	19.9 (67.8)	22.5 (72.5)	24.7 (76.5)	19.2 (66.5)
Daily mean °C (°F)	18.5 (65.3)	18.7 (65.7)	16.4 (61.5)	12.9 (55.2)	8.4 (47.1)	6.4 (43.5)	5.0 (41.0)	6.3 (43.3)	9.0 (48.2)	12.8 (55.0)	15.2 (59.4)	17.6 (63.7)	12.3 (54.1)
Mean daily minimum °C (°F)	11.6 (52.9)	12.1 (53.8)	9.7 (49.5)	5.5 (41.9)	1.3 (34.3)	0.0 (32.0)	−2.0 (28.4)	−0.2 (31.6)	1.8 (35.2)	5.6 (42.1)	7.8 (46.0)	10.4 (50.7)	5.3 (41.5)
Mean minimum °C (°F)	4.8 (40.6)	6.1 (43.0)	1.8 (35.2)	−1.9 (28.6)	−6.5 (20.3)	−7.5 (18.5)	−8.6 (16.5)	−6.9 (19.6)	−4.7 (23.5)	−0.9 (30.4)	0.0 (32.0)	3.2 (37.8)	−9.4 (15.1)
Record low °C (°F)	1.0 (33.8)	2.2 (36.0)	−2.8 (27.0)	−5.6 (21.9)	−10.6 (12.9)	−11.7 (10.9)	−12.8 (9.0)	−10.0 (14.0)	−7.2 (19.0)	−4.2 (24.4)	−2.2 (28.0)	−1.0 (30.2)	−12.8 (9.0)
Average rainfall mm (inches)	118.3 (4.66)	77.9 (3.07)	59.4 (2.34)	43.9 (1.73)	56.7 (2.23)	41.8 (1.65)	52.7 (2.07)	54.9 (2.16)	52.7 (2.07)	76.2 (3.00)	80.7 (3.18)	86.9 (3.42)	802.1 (31.58)
Average rainy days (≥ 1 mm)	8.2	6.6	6.2	4.4	5.6	5.6	6.1	7.2	6.4	7.8	8	7.7	79.8
Source: Bureau of Meteorology (rainfall 1961–1990)

== Flora ==
The district supports a wide range of plants across a variety of land forms. Some of the native plants that can be seen growing naturally in the Walcha township and close by include: acacias (wattles), Eucalyptus viminalis ssp. huberiana (rough barked manna gum), Eucalyptus melliodora (yellow box), Eucalyptus nicholii (Narrow-leaved Black Peppermint), Eucalyptus nova-anglica (New England peppermint), Eucalyptus viminalis (manna or white gum), Exocarpos cupressiformis (native cherry) and Jacksonia scoparia (dogwood).

Some of the rare or endangered plants that may be found growing in the district include: Chiloglottis anaticeps (bird orchid), Eucalyptus michaeliana, (Hillgrove spotted gum) and Philotheca myoporoides (Mountain Wax-flower), which are growing in the local national parks.

== Fauna ==
Grey kangaroos, wallabies, possums, echidnas (spiny ant eaters), black and brown snakes, eastern blue-tongued lizards and Amphibolurus muricatus (Jacky dragons) may be seen in and around the town. Birds that may be found in the local area include: magpies, kookaburras, plovers, wood ducks, spoonbills, galahs, currawongs, crimson rosellas and cockatoos.

== Demographics ==
Historical population
Year	Pop.	±%
1921	1,224	—
1933	1,526	+24.7%
1947	1,550	+1.6%
1954	1,741	+12.3%
1961	1,585	−9.0%
1966	1,550	−2.2%
1971	1,602	+3.4%
1976	1,665	+3.9%
1981	1,674	+0.5%
1986	1,639	−2.1%
1991	1,782	+8.7%
1996	1,623	−8.9%
2001	1,486	−8.4%
2006	1,623	+9.2%
2011	1,482	−8.7%
2016	1,451	−2.1%
2021	1,369	−5.7%
Source: Australian Bureau of Statistics data.

The population of Walcha is mainly Christian (80.4%) and Australian-born (81.1%). The median age of 53 years is older than the Australian average of 38.

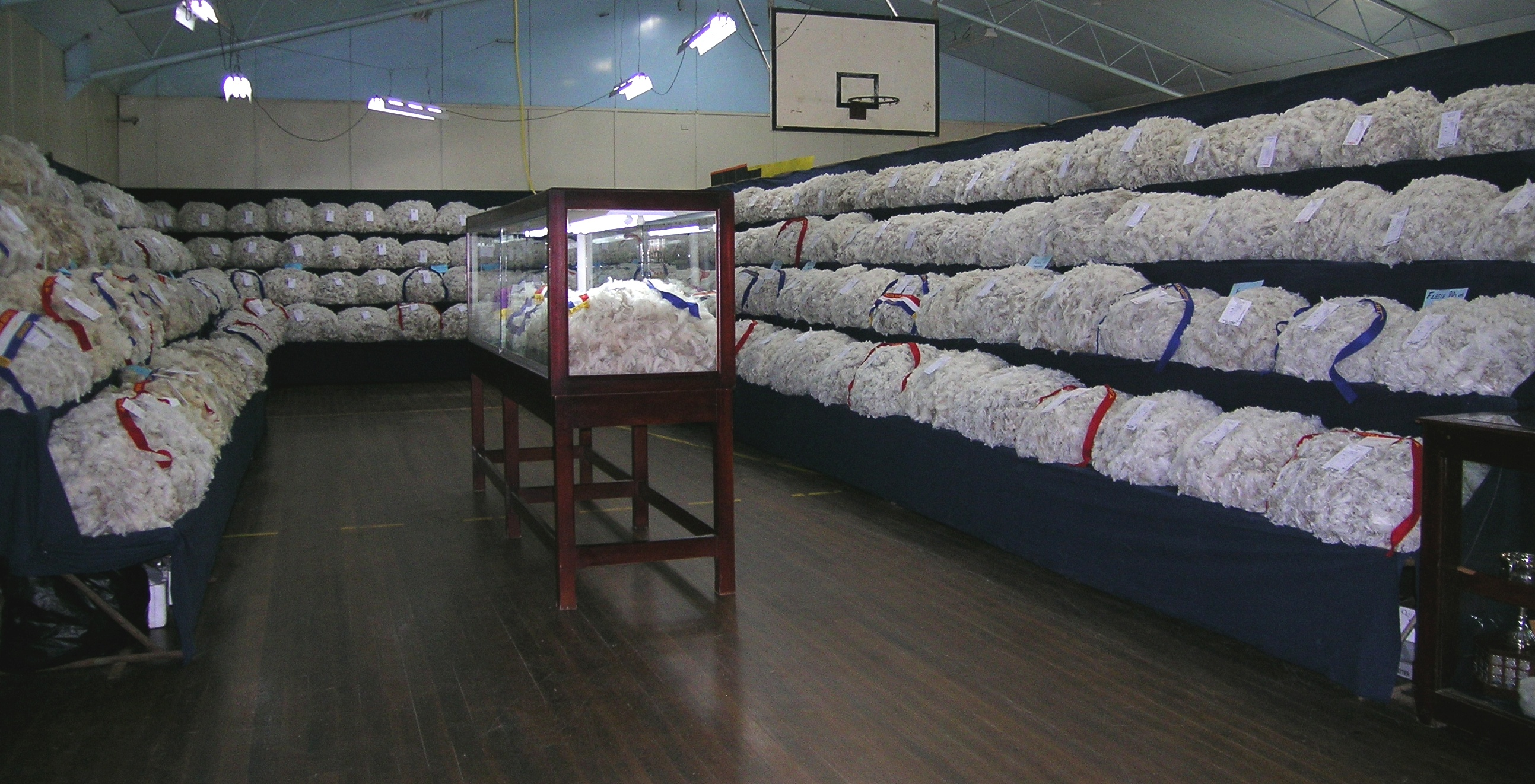
Wool section, Walcha show. The creamy fleeces on the left are crossbred wool.

== Industries ==
Walcha is known as the "Pasture Wonderland" as the dominant industry in the area is livestock grazing along with an expanding timber industry. The district usually runs about 937,000 sheep (mostly Merinos) and around 85,500 stud and commercial beef cattle. Livestock produced in the Walcha district is some best in the country and local superfine wool has been acknowledged as some of the best in the world. A large modern dairy that produces approximately seven million litres of liquid milk per year for the fresh south east Queensland market was established south of the town in 2008.

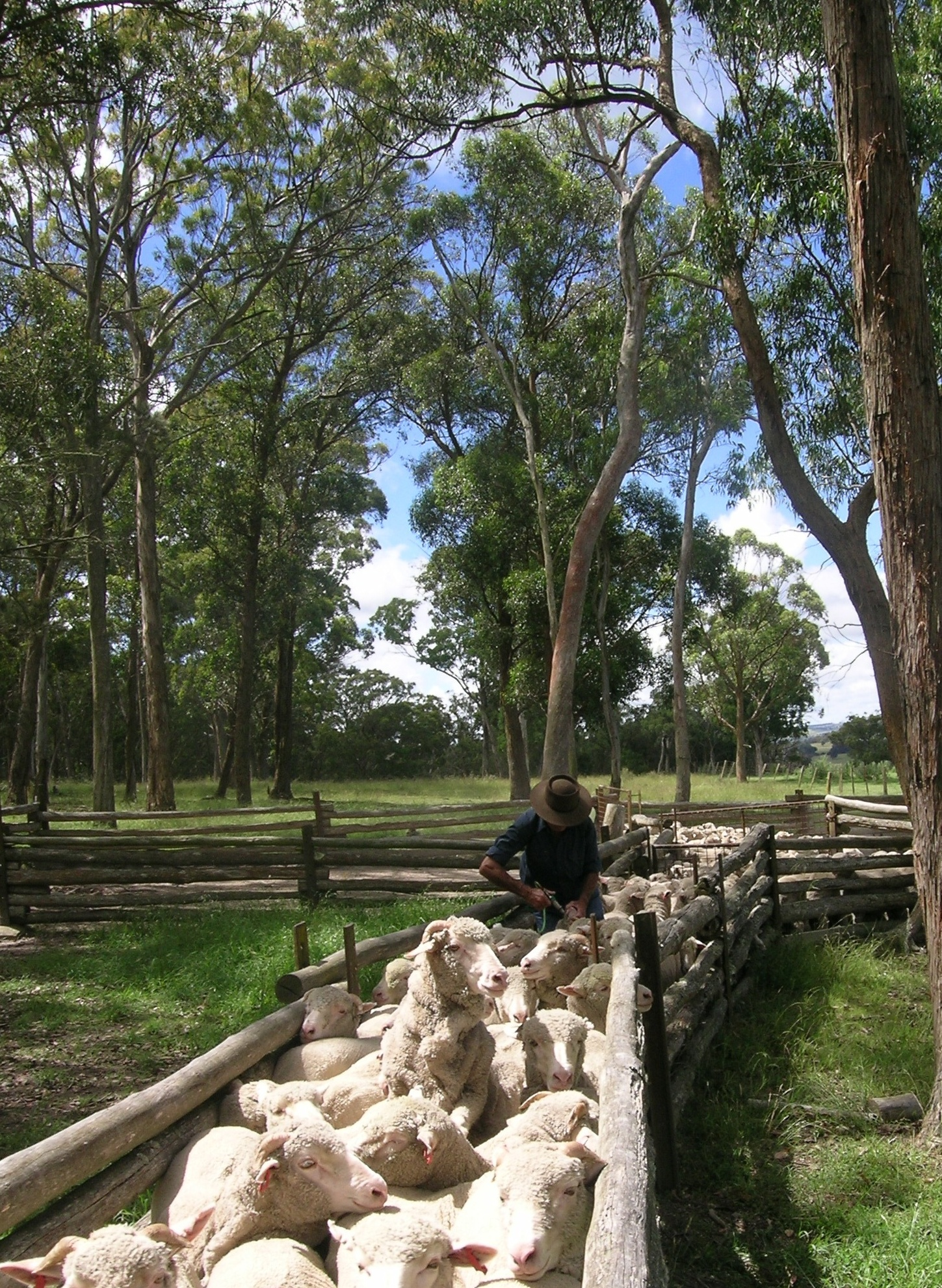
Drenching Merino hoggets in Walcha

Some good Thoroughbred racehorses have been produced in the district including, Blue Spec (won the Melbourne Cup in record time), Kennaquhair (won Sydney Cup in record time and AJC Metropolitan Handicap), Eric and Tar Girl etc. There is a Thoroughbred stud near the town.

There are also several large trucking businesses, a communications business, along with an engineering business. All regular retail services are also available in the town.

== Health care, emergency and education ==
- A modern hospital was opened in 2007 to replace the old one.
- There is a modern Central School, a Roman Catholic primary school and a pre-school.
- Three full-time doctors have surgeries in the town.
- Aged Care-permanent and respite services are available at the Riverview Hostel.
- Ambulance Station with two full-time Ambulance Officers in attendance. The Shire is also serviced by the Angel 3 Westpac Rescue Helicopter Service which is based in Tamworth.
- Community Nurse
- Police Station – (3 police officers). A local Court House which is open every Thursday.
- State Emergency Services have a brigade in Walcha.
- The New South Wales Fire Brigades have a Retained fire station (No. 481) in Walcha
- Walcha and surrounding districts are serviced by the NSW Rural Fire Service and a Brigade of Volunteers run the local Fire Station.

== Attractions ==
Natural attractions abound in the area and include the Apsley Falls located about 20 kilometres east of Walcha just off the Oxley Highway. The first drop of the Falls is about 85 metres in depth, and the second, about half a mile further on, drops around 65 metres to the bottom of the gorge. Walcha is the southern gateway to the Oxley Wild Rivers National Park and Werrikimbe National Park, which are registered with Central Eastern Rainforest Reserves (CERRA). Composing of mainly scenic gorge country, 900 km^{2} of it, part of it is listed on the register of World Heritage sites in recognition of its importance to nature conservation. Other interesting nearby national parks include: Mummel Gulf National Park and Cottan-Bimbang National Park.

Walcha has an Open Air Gallery where local, national and international artists have combined to create a unique streetscape with about 41 sculptures and artworks, plus 30 sculptured verandah posts in front of local businesses. There is approximately one artwork per every 85 citizens in the "Open Air Gallery", along with a large collection of works in the local gallery, making Walcha a very cultural and artistic community for its size.

The town has four churches representing the Roman Catholic, Anglican, and Presbyterian denominations. There are many other tourist attractions including scenic 4WD trips, hiking, the State Forests, fishing, fossicking opportunities, Amaroo Museum & Cultural Centre, Pioneer Cottage museum and the local history archives.

The Walcha Jockey Club, Walcha Bushmen's Campdraft and Rodeo Association, Walcha Show Society and the Campdraft Club hold large annual events that extend over several days each. The Walcha Bushmen's Campdraft and Rodeo Association makes large annual donations to various local organisations and other worthy causes. The New England Merino Field days which display local studs, wool and sheep are held every two years in even numbered years. A biennial Timber Expo was established to showcase the local timber industry. A biennial Garden Festival is held in the spring of even numbered years to display some of the beautiful local gardens. Proceeds from this event are donated to services such as Angel, Westpac Life Saver Rescue Helicopter Service or Riverview Hostel.

There are numerous other sporting and general interest clubs in the town.

== Notable people ==
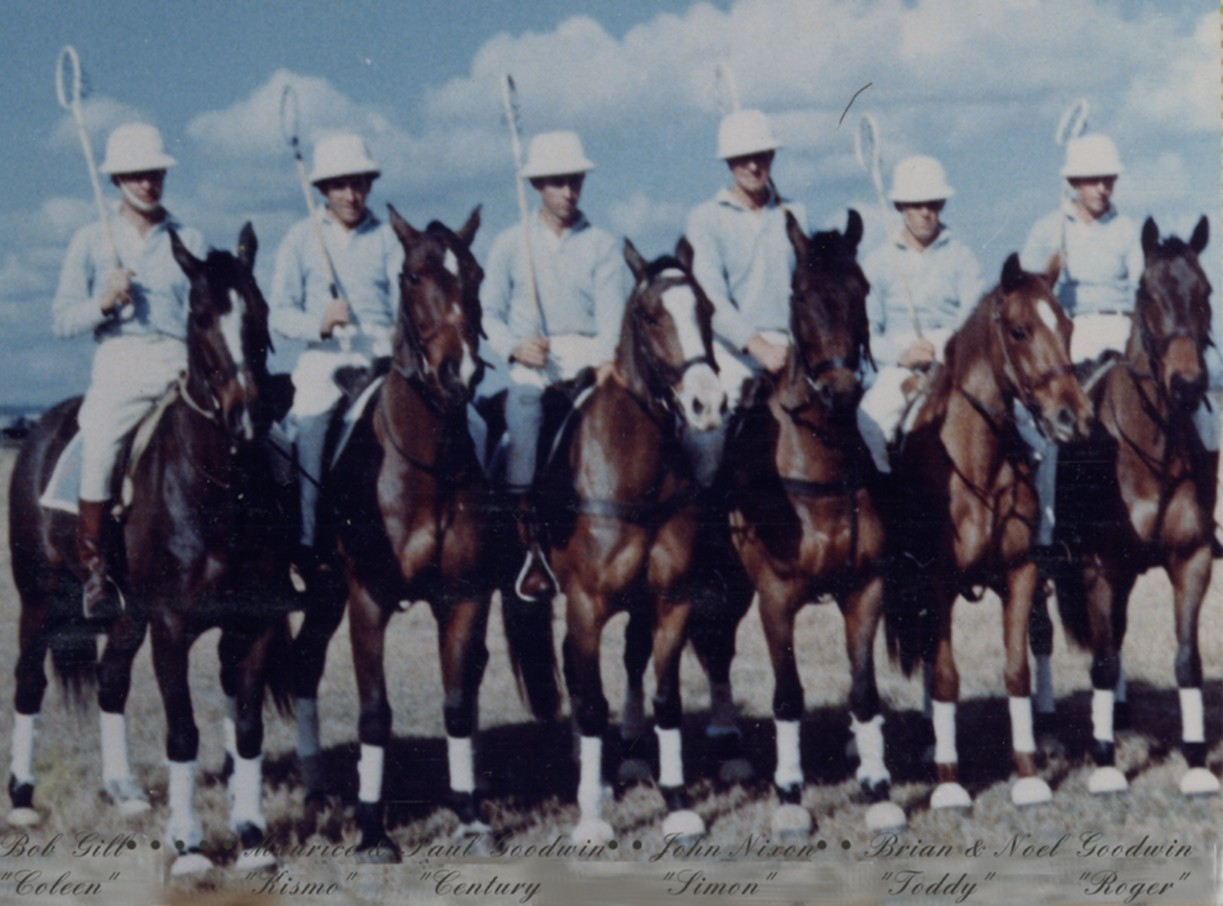
Walcha polocrosse team: Bob Gill, Maurice and Paul Goodwin, John Nixon, Brian and Noel Goodwin

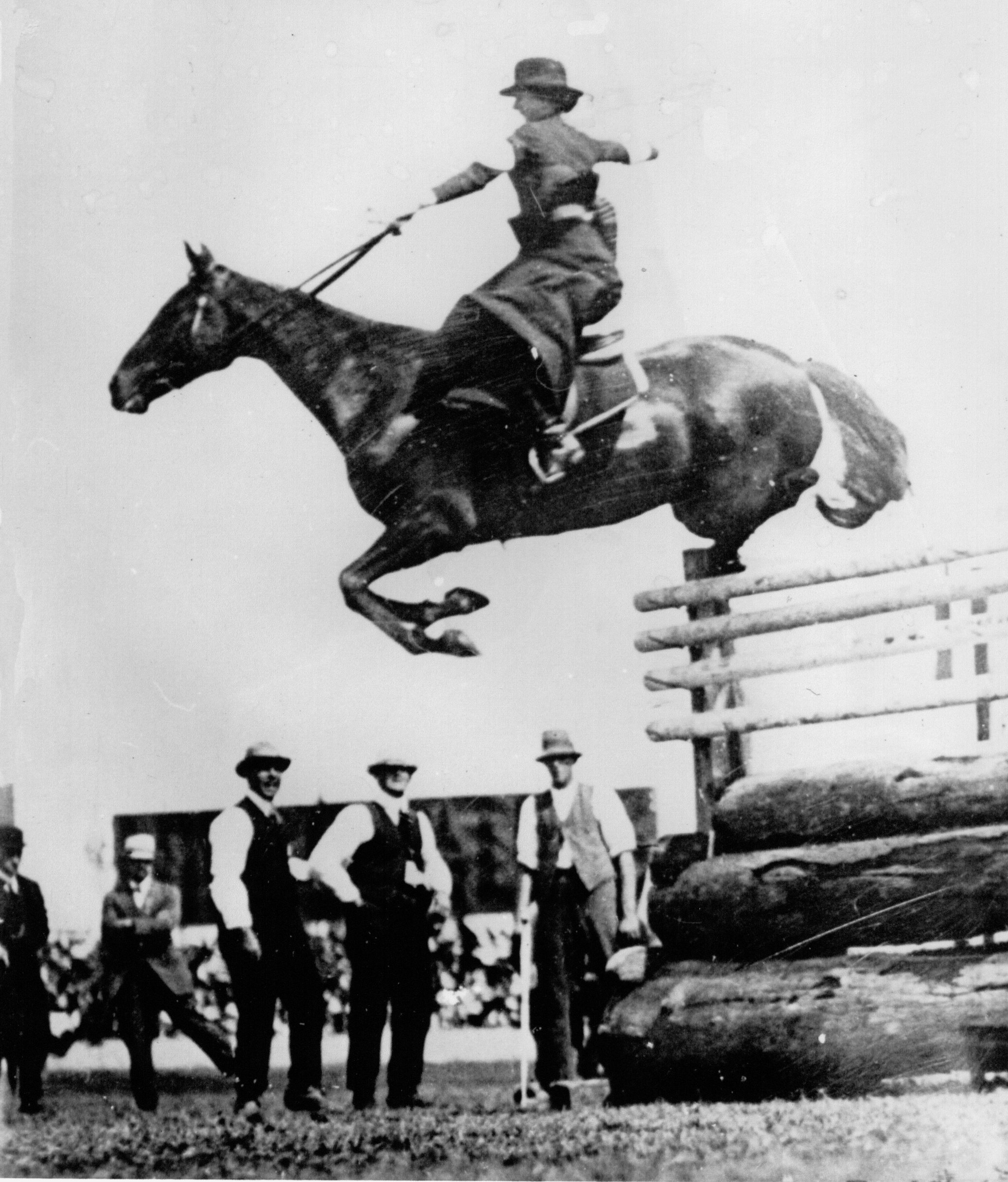
Mrs Esther Stace riding sidesaddle and clearing a record 6'6" at the Sydney Royal Easter Show

- Bob Beer is notable for his feats of endurance which included pedalling around Australia when he was 58 averaging 145 km every day, without support vehicle or backup. He was the first person to run the 420 km across the Simpson Desert, which he accomplished in six days. Bob Beer also made a remarkable solo journey across Australia by kayak from Port Alma to Murray Mouth.
- Peter Fenwicke, rugby union player captained the Australian team on its first world tour in 1957–58.
- Sam Payne, former Australia national rugby union team ("Wallaby") halfback
- Casey Stoner, World MotoGP Champion 2007 – Grand Prix motorcycle racing (1985–); 2008 Young Australian of the Year.

Walcha residents who have been awarded the Medal of the Order of Australia (OAM) are:

- Adrian Mark Allen, For service to medicine, and to the community of Walcha.
- Ruth Louise Cotterill, in recognition of service to the community.
- Andrew John Cross, For service to the community of Walcha.
- Shirley Norma Davison, For service to the Walcha region, particularly through the Amaroo Local Aboriginal Land Council.
- Cecily Faith Hoare for service to the community of Port Macquarie, New South Wales.
- Erle Lewis Hogan for service to the community.
- Irene Doris Hoy for community service and was also awarded the Australian Sports Medal.
- Lindsay Edward McMillan for service to veterans and to the community.
- Stuart Norman Nivison for service to horse racing.
- Jillian Anne Munro Nivison Oppenheimer for service to heritage conservation and the environment, particularly through the National Trust of Australia.
