= Hawes County =

Hawes New South Wales
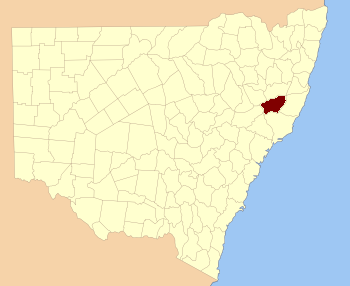
- Location in New South Wales
Lands administrative divisions around Hawes:
Parry	Vernon	Dudley
Brisbane	Hawes	Macquarie
Durham	Gloucester	Gloucester

Hawes County is one of the 141 cadastral divisions of New South Wales. It is bounded on the south by the Manning River.

Hawes County was named in honour of Sir Benjamin Hawes (1797–1862).

== Parishes within this county ==
A full list of parishes found within this county; their current LGA and mapping coordinates to the approximate centre of each location is as follows:

Parish	LGA	Coordinates
Barnard	Mid-Coast Council	31°40′54″S 151°44′04″E
Barry	Upper Hunter Shire	31°37′54″S 151°18′04″E
Brock	Walcha Shire	31°22′54″S 151°49′04″E
Campbell	Upper Hunter Shire	31°39′54″S 151°28′04″E
Cobb	Mid-Coast Council	31°43′54″S 151°48′04″E
Coolcumba	Walcha Shire	31°25′54″S 151°29′04″E
Cooplacurripa	Mid-Coast Council	31°36′54″S 151°51′04″E
Couatwong	Walcha Shire	31°28′54″S 151°45′04″E
Curracabundi	Mid-Coast Council	31°37′24″S 151°38′04″E
Curricabark	Upper Hunter Shire	31°42′54″S 151°27′04″E
Dewitt	Mid-Coast Council	31°46′54″S 151°43′04″E
Giro	Mid-Coast Council	31°38′54″S 151°48′04″E
Hall	Tamworth Regional Council	31°36′54″S 151°32′04″E
Hastings	Port Macquarie-Hastings Council	31°24′54″S 152°14′04″E
Hawes	Walcha Shire	31°25′54″S 151°56′04″E
Lowry	Walcha Shire	31°29′29″S 151°51′31″E
Mackay	Mid-Coast Council	31°45′54″S 151°55′04″E
Mernot	Mid-Coast Council	31°40′54″S 151°34′04″E
Mukki	Walcha Shire	31°22′54″S 151°37′04″E
Mummel	Mid-Coast Council	31°35′54″S 151°52′04″E
Murray	Walcha Shire	31°25′54″S 152°02′04″E
Myall	Walcha Shire	31°32′54″S 151°33′04″E
Myra	Mid-Coast Council	31°45′54″S 151°38′04″E
Naylor	Hastings	31°20′54″S 152°10′04″E
Nowendoc	Walcha Shire	31°32′54″S 151°38′04″E
Parkes	Walcha Shire	31°29′54″S 151°25′04″E
Rowley	Walcha Shire	31°29′54″S 152°02′04″E
Rushbrook	Walcha Shire	31°20′54″S 152°04′04″E
Schofield	Upper Hunter Shire	31°38′54″S 151°21′04″E
Tobin	Hastings	31°23′54″S 152°09′04″E
Togalo	Walcha Shire	31°34′54″S 151°43′04″E
Tomalla	Upper Hunter Shire	31°47′54″S 151°29′04″E
Uriamukki	Walcha Shire	31°22′54″S 151°44′04″E
Vant	Tamworth Regional Council	31°31′54″S 151°17′04″E
Ward	Mid-Coast Council	31°32′54″S 151°47′04″E
Werrikimbe	Hastings	31°14′54″S 152°11′04″E
White	Walcha Shire	31°20′54″S 152°00′04″E
Woko	Mid-Coast Council	31°47′54″S 151°52′04″E
Yeerawun	Tamworth Regional Council	31°34′54″S 151°14′04″E
