= Walcha Road railway station =

Railway station in New South Wales, Australia

Walcha Road
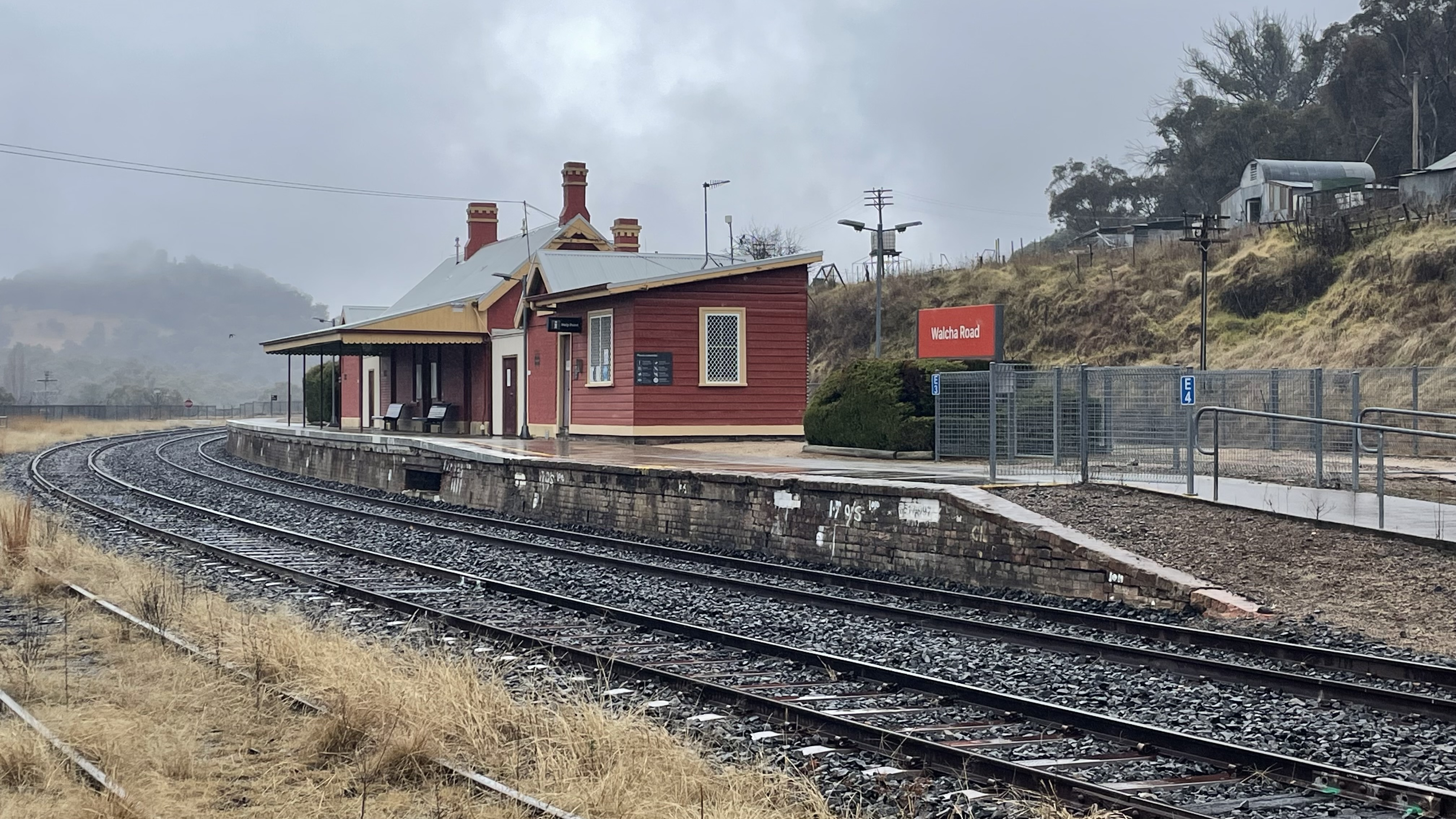
- Station in June 2024

General information
- Location: Wollun-Woolbrook Road, Walcha Road, New South Wales; Australia
- Coordinates: 30°56′28″S 151°24′08″E
- Owner: Transport Asset Manager of New South Wales
- Operator: NSW TrainLink
- Line: Main Northern
- Distance: 517.9 km (321.8 mi) from Central
- Platforms: 1
- Tracks: 3

Construction
- Structure type: Ground
- Accessible: Assisted access

Other information
- Station code: WLC

History
- Opened: 2 August 1882

Services
Preceding station	NSW TrainLink	Following station
Uralla towards Armidale	NSW TrainLink North Western Line	Kootingal towards Sydney
Former services
Preceding station	Former services	Following station
Wollun towards Wallangarra	Main Northern Line	Woolbrook towards Sydney

New South Wales Heritage Register
- Official name: Walcha Road Railway Station and yard group
- Type: State heritage (complex / group)
- Designated: 2 April 1999
- Reference no.: 1281
- Type: Railway Platform / Station
- Category: Transport – Rail
Location
- Location within New South Wales

Walcha Road railway station is a heritage-listed railway station located on the Main Northern line in Walcha Road, New South Wales, Australia. The railway station serves the village of Walcha Road and town of Walcha, opening on 2 August 1882 when the line was extended from Kootingal to Uralla. It is also known as Walcha Road Railway Station and yard group. The property was added to the New South Wales State Heritage Register on 2 April 1999.

== Services ==
Walcha Road station is served by NSW TrainLink's daily Northern Tablelands Xplorer service operating between Armidale and Sydney.

Platform	Line	Stopping pattern	Notes
1	North Western Region	services to Sydney Central & Armidale	

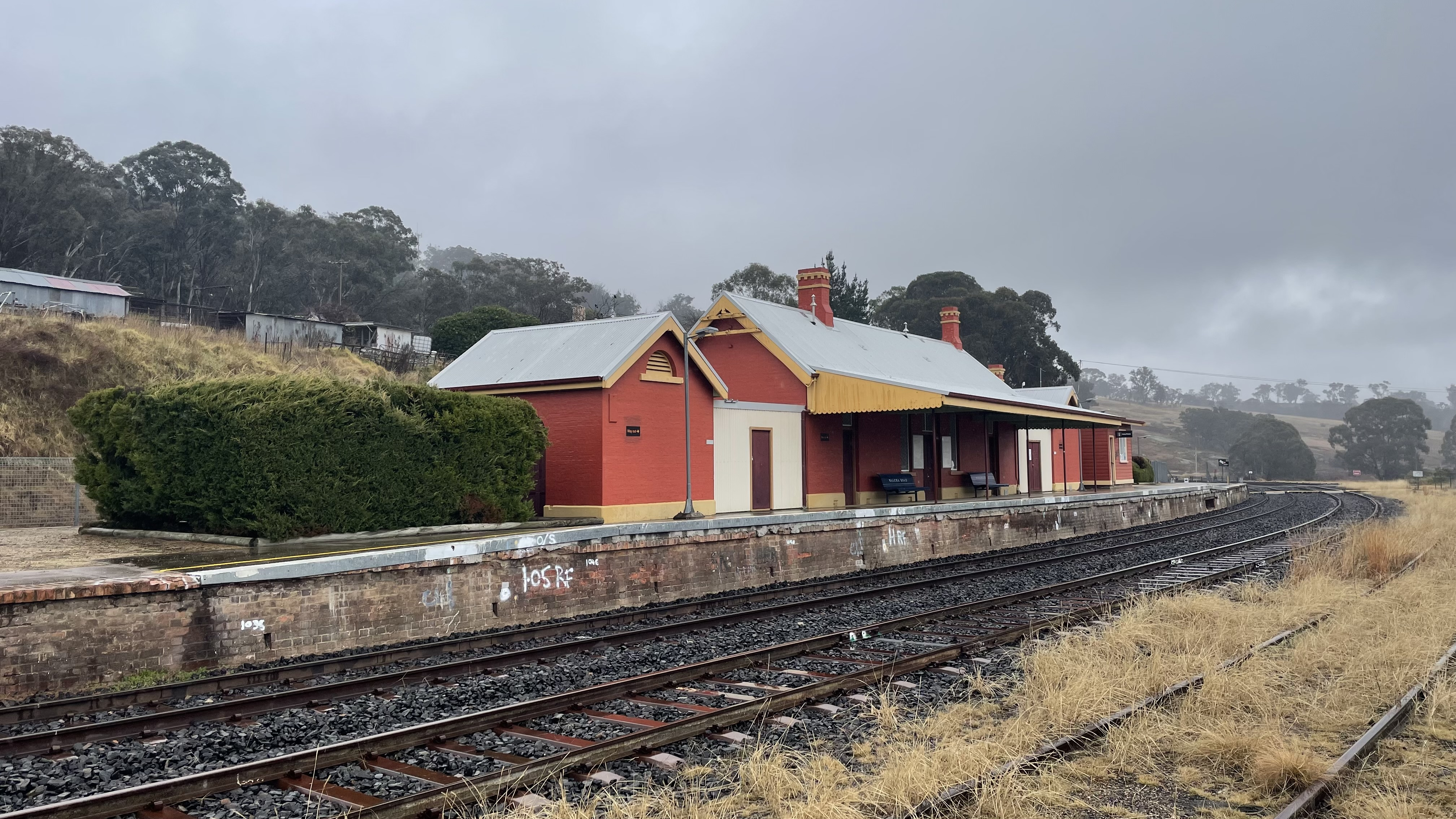
Northbound view

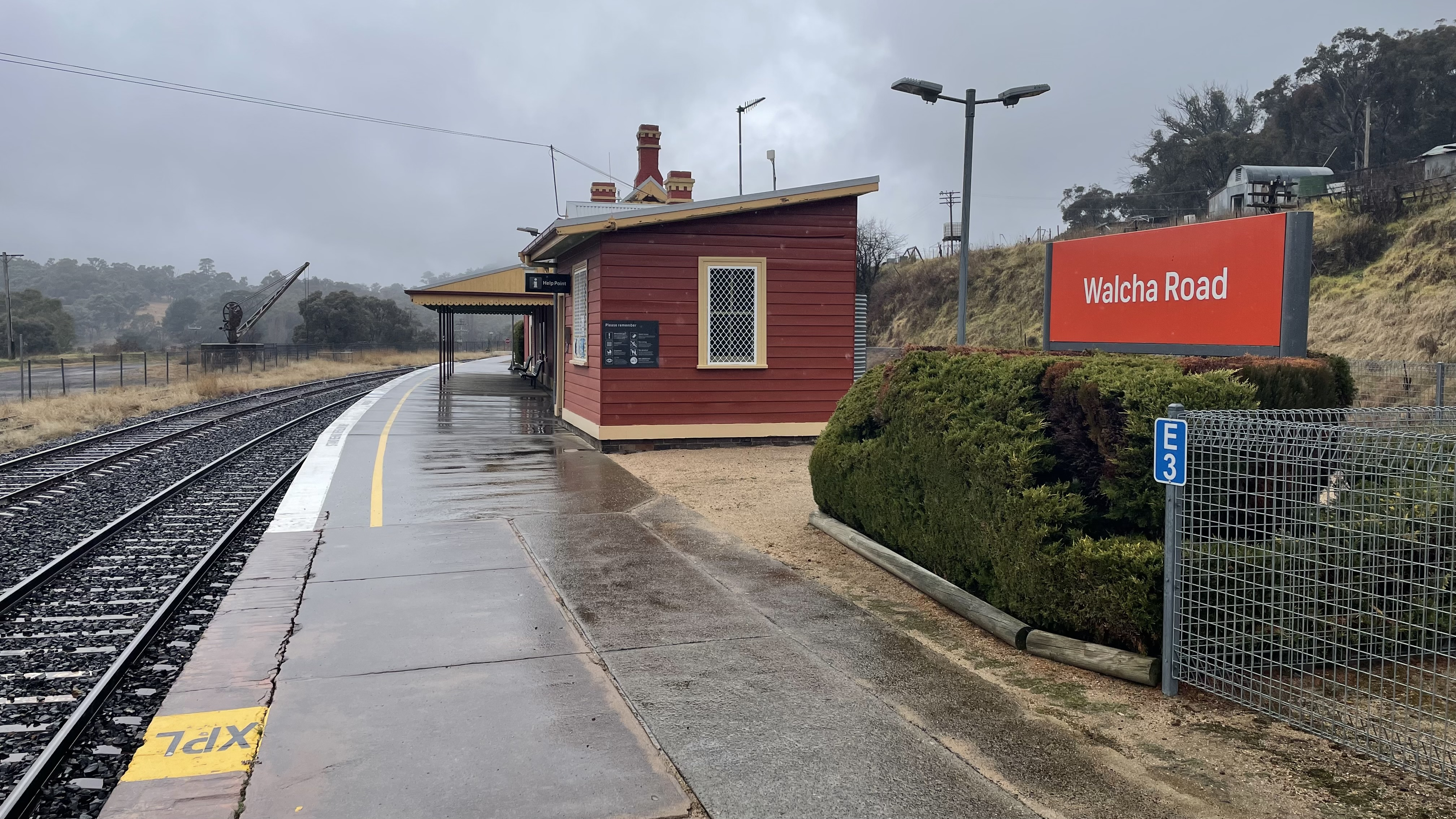
Southbound view

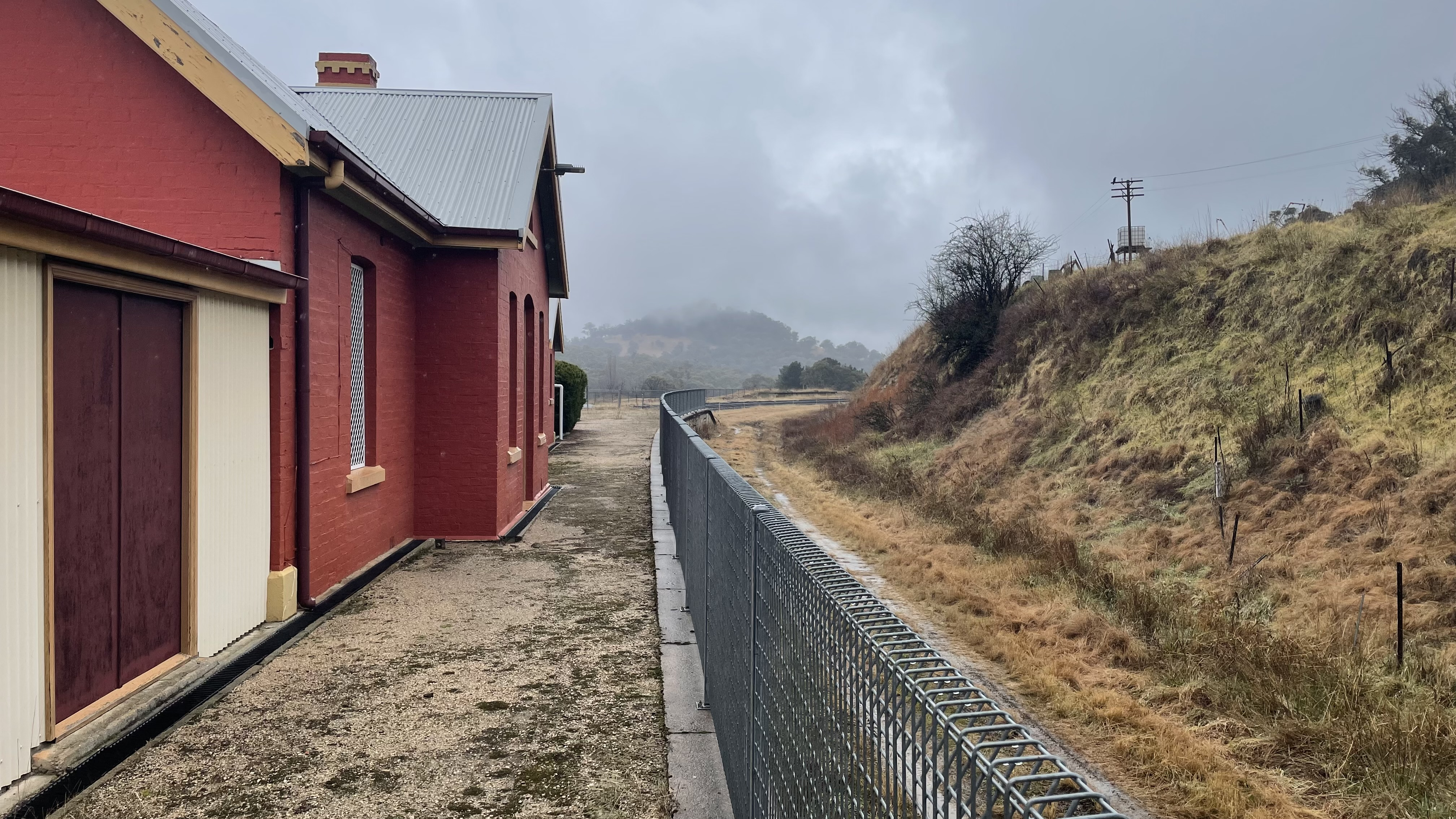
Disused platform

== Description ==
Buildings in the complex comprise a standard roadside station, type 4, completed in 1882, with a brick platform face; a signal box with a skillion roof on platform, c. 1914; a residence for a night officer, type 6, brick, and completed in 1882; and a loading bank.

== Heritage listing ==
The station complex is an intact standard roadside station with only minor detail altered. As such it is a rare surviving example. The signal box added for the yard layout is a typical simple on-platform box. The station was later provided with a second platform behind the original building, a rather unusual situation in the country, but this was removed in 1993 and the layout rebuilt. The residence is a good example of a simple symmetrical brick residence with detached front verandah. Its position overlooking the station enhances the sites significance.

Walcha Road railway station was listed on the New South Wales State Heritage Register on 2 April 1999 having satisfied the following criteria.

The place possesses uncommon, rare or endangered aspects of the cultural or natural history of New South Wales.

This item is assessed as historically rare. This item is assessed as archaeologically rare. This item is assessed as socially rare.
