= Yarrowitch, New South Wales =

Yarrowitch
- Town
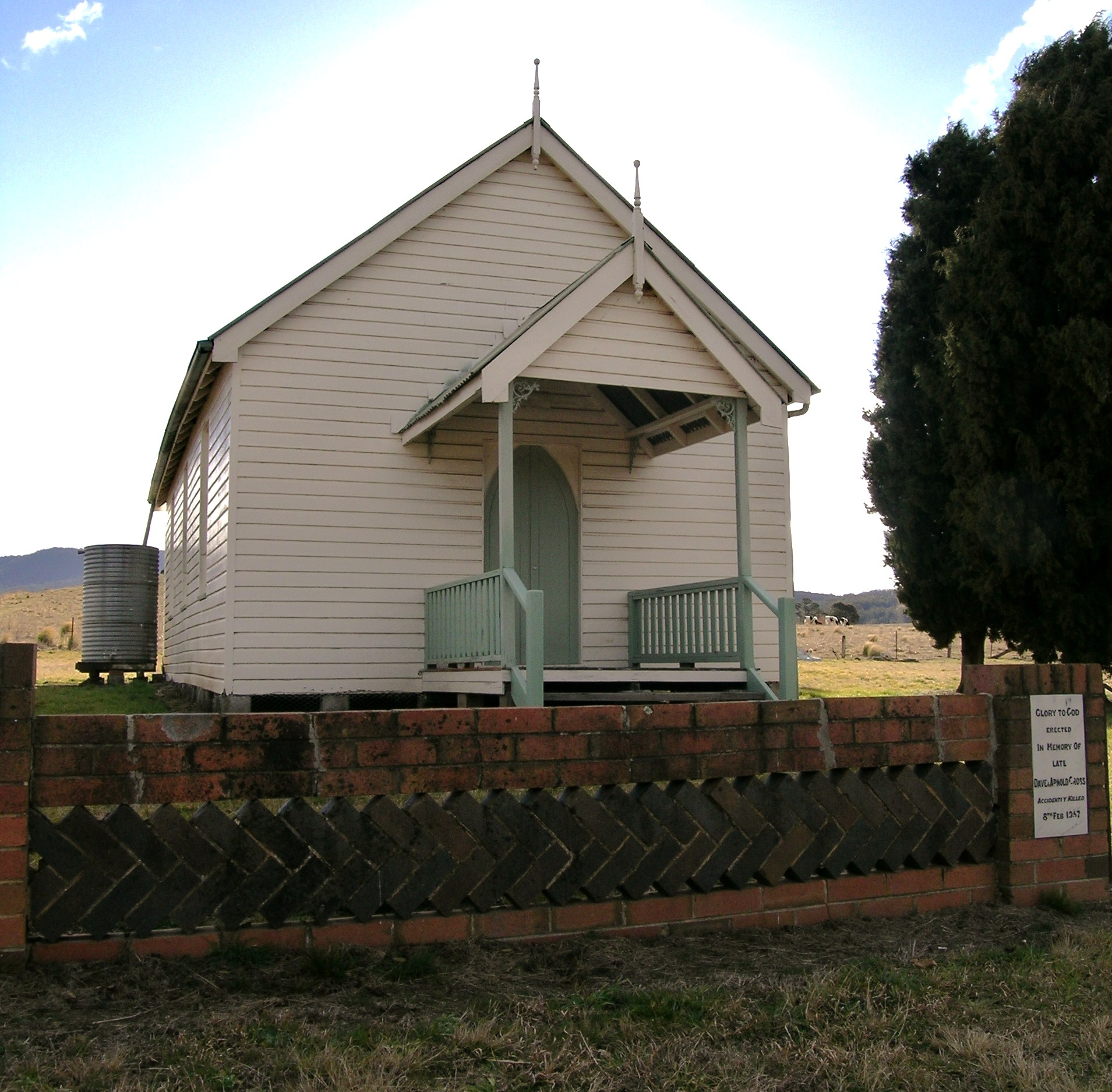
- The church at Yarrowitch, NSW

- Coordinates: 31°16′S 151°58′E
- Country: Australia
- State: New South Wales
- LGA: Walcha Shire
- Location: 50 km (31 mi) SE of Walcha; 133 km (83 mi) W of Port Macquarie

Government
  - State electorate: Tamworth
  - Federal division: New England
- Elevation: 940 m (3,080 ft)

Population
  - Total: 171 (SAL 2021)
- Postcode: 2354
- County: Vernon

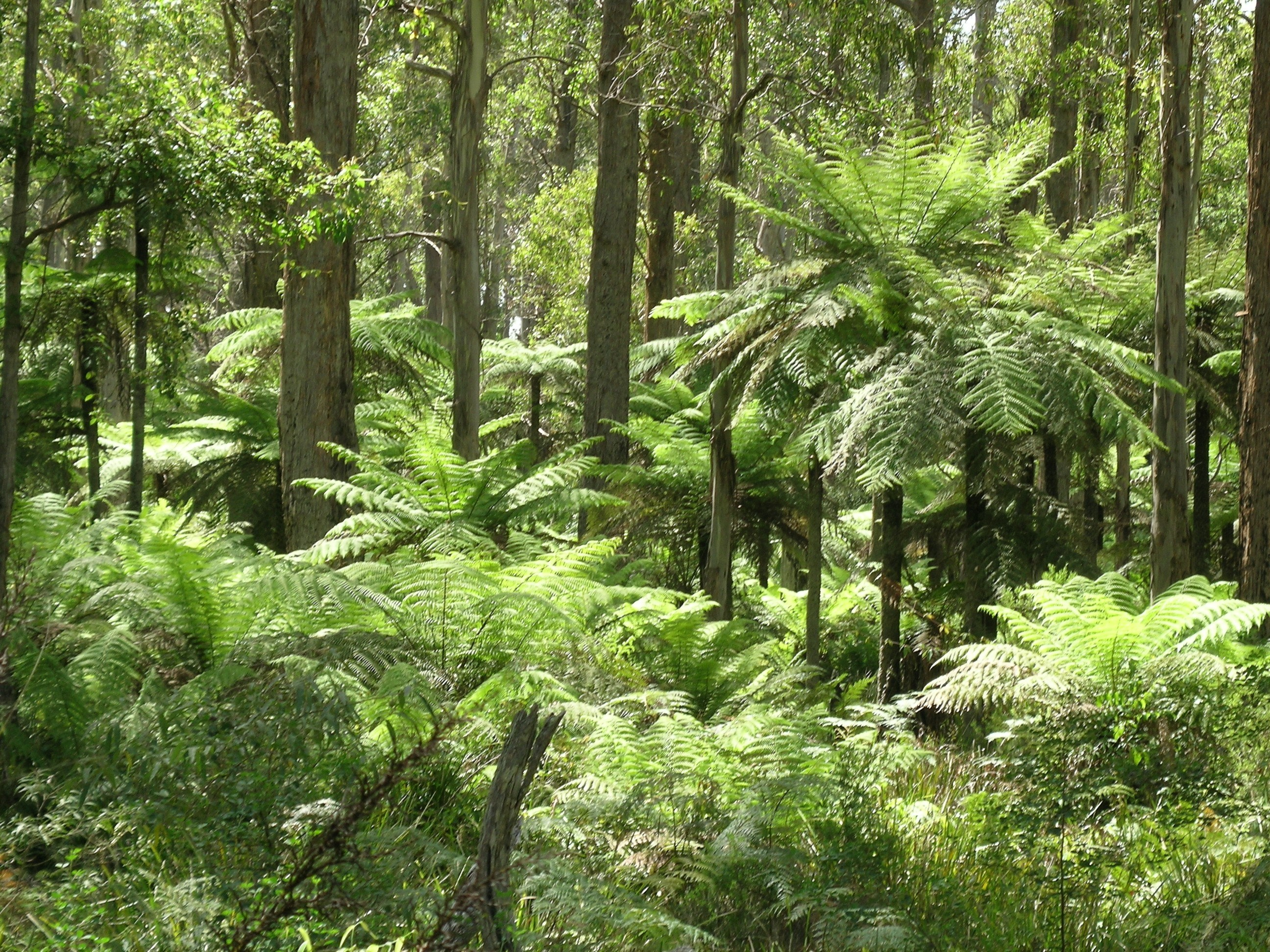
Tree ferns, Werrikimbe National Park, Yarrowitch, NSW

Yarrowitch is a small rural locality on the Northern Tablelands, New South Wales, Australia. It is located in the picturesque Yarrowitch River Valley on the Oxley Highway 48 kilometres east of Walcha. The settlement is included in the Walcha Shire Local Government Area in the New England region. The locality is at an elevation of about 995 metres and the area is part of Vernon County. At the 2011 census, the Yarrowitch area had a population of 167.

== History ==
John Oxley's expedition passed through Yarrowitch on 17 September 1818. They camped overnight on the eastern side of the River, before traversing the steep, rugged terrain and almost impenetrable scrub on their way to Port Macquarie.

The name, Yarrowitch, was probably derived from the English place name Yarrow, although there is an Aboriginal word 'Yarrawee', said to mean 'gum tree growing in water'.

John Allman and N. Powell occupied the area in c.1836. Shortly afterwards they were joined by Allman's brother, Francis. In about 1839 the Allmans were joined by Arthur Hodgson and by the end of that year the land had been divided into two sections. The following year, 1840, runs were acquired by Alexander Todd and Christopher Dawson Fenwicke. They were the first licensed lessees of Yarrowitch. Todd, licence 114, held east Yarrowitch containing 32,000 acres (130 km^{2}), and Fenwicke, licence 53, held western Yarrowitch containing 30,400 acres (123 km^{2}).

The Robertson Land Acts introduced in 1861 enabled small farmers to select blocks of Crown Land, and this further expanded the area. By 1900 the Yarrowitch district was fairly well established and an item from the Walcha Witness in 1898 gave an insight into life at Yarrowitch at the time ... "Yarrowitch News . . . Matters are looking up this way lately as regards selecting and new buildings. The new school building has been erected on a more sheltered situation and reflects credit on the contractor's workmanship. What with wheat and maize growing, pig farming and onion growing, some of the more recent selectors have now fairly lined pockets. The potato crop turned out fairly well but from appearances, wheat is going to be a general favourite with us". As well as these farming crops, cattle and sheep grazing and Australian red cedar cutting were the main sources of income.

In 1948, the New South Wales Department of Lands purchased Yarrowitch Station for closer settlement under the Lands Settlement Act. The property was then divided into seventeen blocks which were balloted out to returned soldiers and their families.

Most of the district was able to have a telephone connected in the 1930s. Yarrowitch settlement was connected to 240 volt electricity in 1962, although many outlying areas such as Kangaroo Flat were still unconnected. In 1977, the Oxley Highway was sealed to Walcha and Port Macquarie which made for much better access to these towns. Previously travel along this road was at the mercy of the weather which had sometimes meant that some of the hills became too slippery to negotiate.

During the 1980s the property Glenferrie in the Kangaroo Flat area was split up into many small blocks. Quite a few of the owners of these blocks only visited their land on the weekends and were known as "weekend or hobby farmers".

Yarrowitch has a church, public school, sports ground and a community hall.

== Attractions ==
Werrikimbe National Park, a large and remote World Heritage listed park is situated on the end of the Kangaroo Flat Road about 26 kilometres from Yarrowitch. Most of Werrikimbe Park is protected under the World Heritage list, which recognises places of outstanding importance across the planet. The National Park is home to the rare mammal, the Hastings River Mouse, considered to be in imminent danger of extinction.

== See also ==
- Soldier settlement (Australia)
