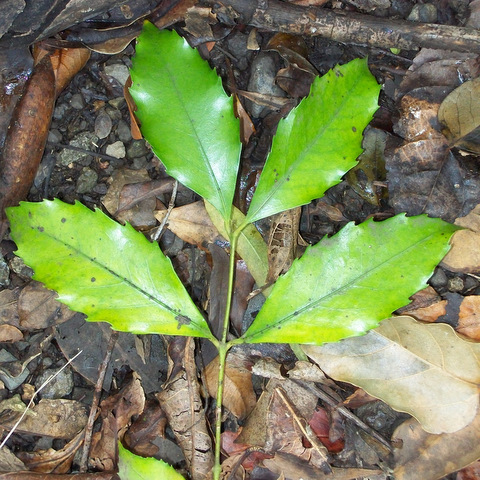
- Leaves from a fallen branch

Conservation status
- Endangered (EPBC Act)

Scientific classification
- Kingdom: Plantae
- Clade: Tracheophytes
- Clade: Angiosperms
- Clade: Magnoliids
- Order: Laurales
- Family: Atherospermataceae
- Genus: Daphnandra
- Species: D. johnsonii

Binomial name
- Daphnandra johnsonii Schodde

= Daphnandra johnsonii =

Illawarra socketwood

Species of tree

Daphnandra johnsonii, also known as the Illawarra socketwood, is a rare rainforest tree in the Illawarra district of eastern Australia.

== Habitat ==
It is found most often at less than 150 metres above sea level (ASL) on volcanic soils in subtropical rainforest. Occasionally, it is found as high as 350 metres ASL. It grows often by creeks, or on dry rocky scree slopes, and in disturbed forest and rainforest margins. It is distributed from Berry to Scarborough in the Illawarra (34° S).

== Naming and taxonomy ==
A member of the ancient Gondwana family Atherospermataceae, the Illawarra socketwood is in danger of extinction. Formerly considered the southernmost population of Daphnandra micrantha, the Australian socketwood, it has been recognised as a separate species. The type specimen was collected in the Illawarra district by L.A.S. Johnson, after whom the species was named by Richard Schodde. The generic name Daphnandra refers to a similarity of the anthers of the bay laurel: Greek daphne refers to the bay laurel, and andros 'man'. The term 'socketwood' is from the related species Daphnandra apatela, a feature of which is the larger branchlets meeting the main trunk in what resembles a ball-and-socket joint.

== Description ==
Daphnandra johnsonii is a small to medium-sized tree, growing to around 20 metres tall, a stem diameter of 30 cm, with a broad, shady crown. The trunk is beige in colour, cylindrical with little buttressing. It is sometimes seen with coppice leaves at the base. The bark is fairly smooth with some raised pustules of a darker colour. Branchlets are fairly thick with lenticels, becoming wider and flatter at the nodes. Leaf scars are evident. Leaf buds have soft hairs.

=== Leaves ===
Leaves are ovate or elliptic in shape, 6 to 12 cm long, 1.5 cm to 6 cm wide with a sharply angled tip. Leaves are opposite on the stem, prominently toothed, with seven to nine teeth on each side of the leaf. The bottom third of the leaf is without leaf serrations. The point of the leaf base to the first serration is almost a straight line. The bottom of the leaf is glossy pale green, while the top side is a dull dark green.

Leaf venation is more evident under the leaf. Lateral veins are not clear on the top surface. The midrib is raised on both upper and lower sides of the leaf. There are six or seven pairs of lateral veins. Leaf stems are 2 to 7 mm long, and smooth. Old leaves go pale and turn yellow on the stem.

==== Leaf comparison with common sassafras ====
The leaves of Daphnandra johnsonii are similar to the related common sassafras (Doryphora sassafras). There are one or two teeth per centimetre on the Illawarra socketwood, and the midrib is raised above and below. Lateral veins of the common sassafras are at a less acute angle than the Illawarra socketwood. The lateral veins of the Illawarra socketwood are sharply angled at around 40 degrees in relation to the midrib of the leaf.

The scent of the leaf is more faint and 'soapy' on the Illawarra socketwood. Leaves of common sassafras are more aromatic, usually less coarsely toothed, and the midrib is sunken on the upper surface. Common sassafras leaves are thicker and heavier to touch.

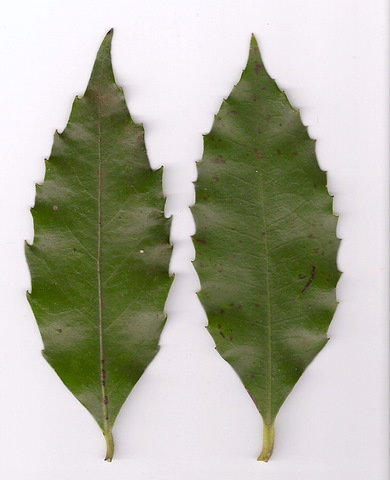
Leaf of Illawarra socketwood (left), common sassafras (right)

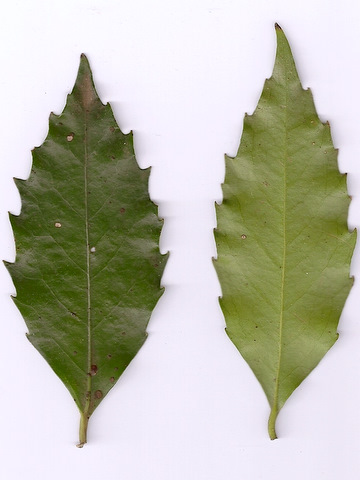
Illawarra socketwood, leaves scanned from above and below

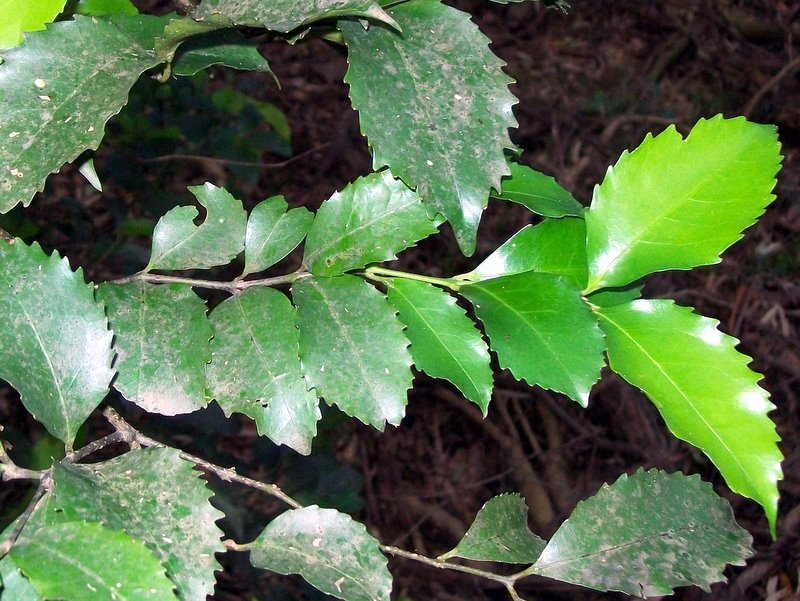
Illawarra socketwood, coppice leaves

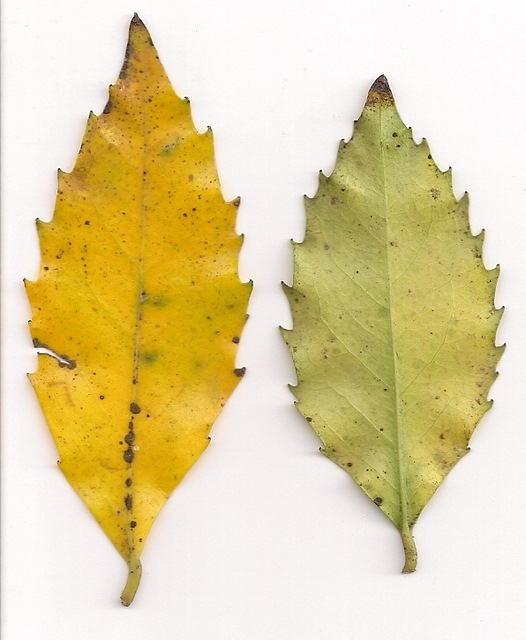
Illawarra socketwood, old leaves

=== Flowers and fruit ===
Tiny flowers appear in spring, on long flower stems. The flowers are white with pinkish red margins, forming on panicles or racemes, 3 to 8 cm long. The sepals and petals are around 1 to 3 mm. The fruiting capsule is woody and hairless, around 15 to 20 mm long, opening in two sections. Mature seeds are feathery.

==== Regeneration ====
Healthy seeds germinate readily within a month of sowing.

Plants often don't produce fertile fruit in the wild and these fruit are shorter and rounder than the viable fruit. These short fruit appear to be galled and contain no seed but contain many silky hairs or plumes that are normally attached to the seeds. Some trees contain a mixture of both short, galled fruits and long fertile fruits. Most trees seem to only produce galled fruits and trees that produce only fertile fruits are rare.

Daphnandra johnsonii also has a limited ability to colonize new areas. Its main survival strategy is the ability to sucker and coppice.

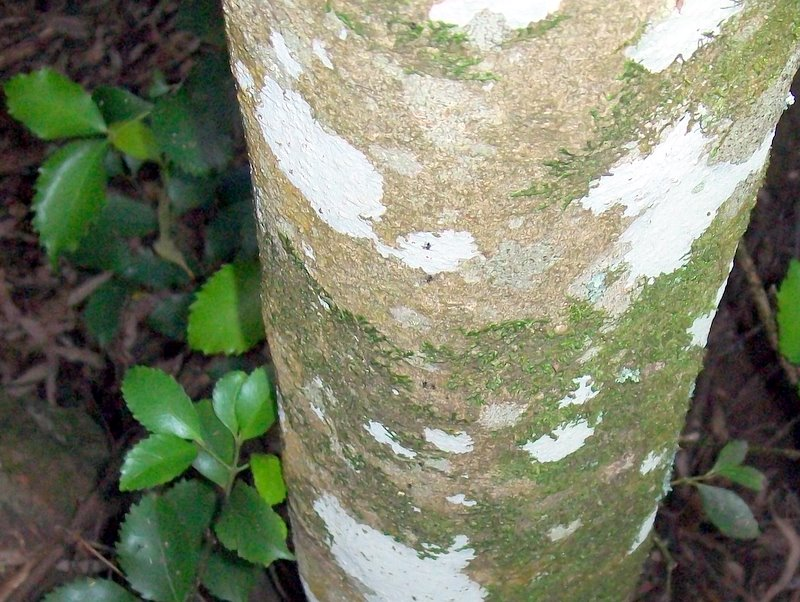
Daphnandra johnsonii, trunk and coppice leaves, Illawarra, NSW

== Conservation and threats ==
Most of the 41 sites are under immediate threat from clearing for agriculture, urban expansion, feral animals, weeds, inappropriate use of fire and herbicide, quarrying, and road construction. Only two small populations are conserved in the reserve system. The biggest and healthiest populations are on private property.
