= Gualterio Looser =

Chilean botanist (1898–1982)

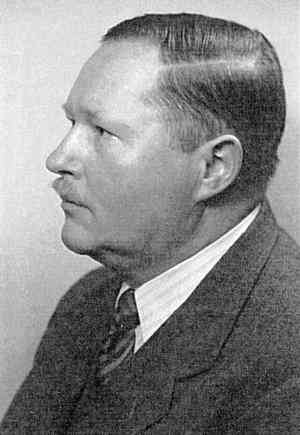
- Gualterio Looser Schallemberg
- Born: Gualterio Looser Schallemberg; September 4, 1898; Chile, Santiago, Chile
- Died: July 23, 1982 (aged 83); Chile, Santiago, Chile
- Spouse: Martha Hoffmann
- Children: Leonel Looser Hoffmann
- Parent(s): Ulrich Looser, Laura Schallemberg

Gualterio Looser Schallemberg (September 4, 1898, Santiago – July 22, 1982) was a Chilean botanist and engineer of Swiss descent. He owned a factory that made agricultural implements.

In 1928, Looser joined the American Fern Society, and started to publish papers on the pteridophytes of Chile. His herbarium containing approximately 8000 specimens was given to the Geneva Botanical Garden.

== Early life ==
Born in Santiago, Chile, Gualterio Looser was the son of a Swiss father, Ulrich Looser, and a Swiss-French mother, Laura Schallemberg, both originally from the Swiss city of Toggenburg. From a young age, he showed a keen interest in the natural sciences and began to develop as a naturalist. He collected plants, insects, stones, and other objects that piqued his curiosity. He received his education at the German School of Santiago and later at the Liceo de Aplicación. On January 3, 1916, he earned a Bachelor of Humanities degree from the University of Chile.

Although he wanted to study engineering, Looser worked with his sister Elena in his father's factory in Santiago, which produced agricultural spare parts. However, he continued to pursue his passion for scientific activities, particularly in ethnology, ethnography, and archaeology. He also created a significant library, comprising volumes on botany, archaeology, and ethnology, which grew rapidly as Looser acquired any books related to science. Looser married Martha Hoffmann and had a son, Leonel Looser Hoffmann.

== Scientific career and contribution to the MNHN ==
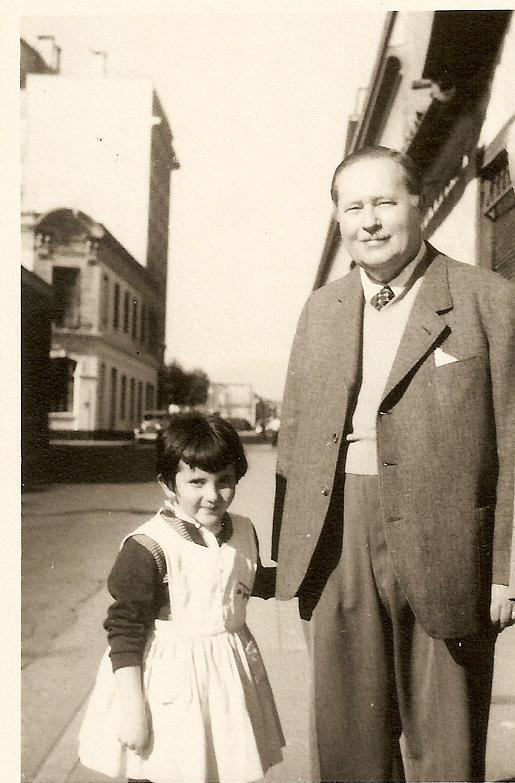
Looser with his goddaughter

In 1922, he joined the School of Advanced Studies, established by the MNHN for the specialization and training of natural science doctors. Due to his passion and enthusiasm for anthropology, in 1923, he began working as an honorary assistant to Leotardo Matus, Head of the Section of Anthropology, Ethnology, and Archaeology at the Museum. During his time as an assistant, Looser worked on an honorary basis until he was appointed Head of the section in 1926, a position he held until 1931, coinciding with the period in which he began publishing his works in the Chilean Journal of Natural History. Simultaneously, he was a member and founder of many scientific societies, including the Chilean Academy of Natural Sciences, the Chilean Society of History and Geography, the Scientific Society of Valparaíso, the Tree Society, the Chilean Archaeological Society, and the Société de Americanistes de Paris, among other associations like the "American Fern Society," which he joined in 1928.

At the MNHN, he collaborated with naturalist Carlos E. Porter, who directed the Journal of Natural History. In 1925, Looser published his first article in this publication. His botanical works were published in the MNHN bulletin; botany was the area in which Looser made his most significant contributions, particularly in the study of pteridophytes, in which he published more than 80 works. Looser discovered 29 species, along with a subgenus of moss, and amassed a herbarium of over 40,000 plant specimens, which, after his death, was donated to the Aellen Foundation in Switzerland. His botanical observations are detailed in "Botánica miscelánea," a series of publications released between 1928 and 1956. In these publications, Looser's interest in various aspects of botany is evident, from taxonomy to ecology, considering physiological and phytogeographical aspects as well. Gualterio Looser made a considerable contribution to science in Chile, as reflected in the 427 publications he produced during his lifetime as a man of science. He is also regarded as an authority in the field of pteridophyte plants.

On February 3, 1943, he was a founding member of the Chilean Folklore Association (currently the Society of Chilean Folklore) alongside individuals like Aureliano Oyarzún Navarro, Ismael Edwards Matte, Domingo Santa Cruz, Oreste Plath, Ricardo Donoso, Raúl Silva Castro, Benedicto Chuaqui, Andrés Sabella, Carlos Lavín, Oscar Cortés, Humberto Grez, Leopoldo Pizarro, Vicente Reyes Covarrubias, Víctor Castro,

 Luis Gómez Catalán, Alberto Ried, Remigio Acevedo, Carlota Andrée, María Luisa Sepúlveda, Camila Bari de Zañartu, Emilia Garnham, Carlos S. Reed, Sady Zañartu, Juana Risi de Maldini, and María Bichón. Anyone who attended the first meeting was considered a member. [4]

In April 1977, the Faculty of Philosophy at the University of Zurich awarded him a Doctor of Philosophy degree in recognition of his work in collecting and researching Chilean flora and fauna. In 1979, the Society of Biology of Chile and the Pontifical Catholic University of Chile also honored Gualterio Looser. The university, with which Looser had been associated for over half a century, named him an Honorary Professor of the Faculty of Biological Sciences and awarded him a Medal of Merit for his service as Secretary of the Chilean Academy of Natural Sciences.

== Selected works ==
- 1934: Geografía Botánica de Chile (Translation of Karl F. Reiche's "Grundzüge der Pflanzenverbreitung in Chile")
- 1928: Botánica miscelánea. Revista Univ. (Santiago) 13, 523
- 1935: Smith L.B. & Looser G. Las especies chilenas del género Puya. Rev. Univ. (Santiago) 20, 241-279.
- 1948: The ferns of southern Chile. Amer. Fern J. 38, 33-44
- 1955: Los helechos (Pteridófitos) de Chile central. Moliniana 1, 5-95
- 1973: El botánico chileno Eberhard Kausel. Bol. Soc. Argent. Bot. 15, 137

== Plants named in honor of G. Looser ==
- Blechnum chilensis var. reedii (=B.cordatum(Desv.) Hieron.)
- Blechnum fernandezianum (Looser) Prada et Rolleri (= Blechnum blechnoides var fernandezianum)
- Copiapoa taltalensis (=Werderm.) Looser
- Cryptocarya alba (=Molina) Looser
- Dicranopteris squamulosa var. gunckeliana (=Desv.) Looser (= Gleichenia squamulosa var. gunckeliana (Looser) Duek)
- Dennstaedtia glauca (=Cav.) C.Chr. ex Looser
- Garaventia graminifolia (=F.Phil.) Looser
- Laurelia philippiana (Looser) (= Laureliopsis philippiana (Looser) Schodde)
- Ochagavia carnea L.B.Sm. & Looser
- Polypodium feuillei Bertero var. ibañezii Looser
- Polystichum chilense (=Christ) Diels var. dusenii Looser ex R.A.Rodr.

== Honors ==
=== Epithets ===
Several authors have commemorated Looser with specific epithets:

- Solanum looseri (=S. etuberosum Lindl.) by Sergei M. Bukasov
- Nassauvia looseri (Asteraceae) by Ángel L. Cabrera
- Aloysia looseri (Verbenaceae) by Harold N. Moldenke
- Amaranthus looseri (Amaranthaceae) by Karl Suessenguth
- Astragalus looseri (Fabaceae) by Ivan M. Johnston
- Tropaeolum looseri (Tropaeolaceae) by Benkt Sparre

== Herbarium ==
His collections were deposited in the Conservatory and Botanical Garden of the city of Geneva.

== Some taxa described by G Looser ==
- Boldea boldus (=Peumus boldus).
- Cryptocarya alba (Molina) Looser.
- Laureliopsis philippiana (Looser) Schodde as Laurelia.
- Sticherus squamulosus (Desv.) Nakai var. gunckelianus (Looser) R. Rodr. et Ponce as Dicranopteris.
