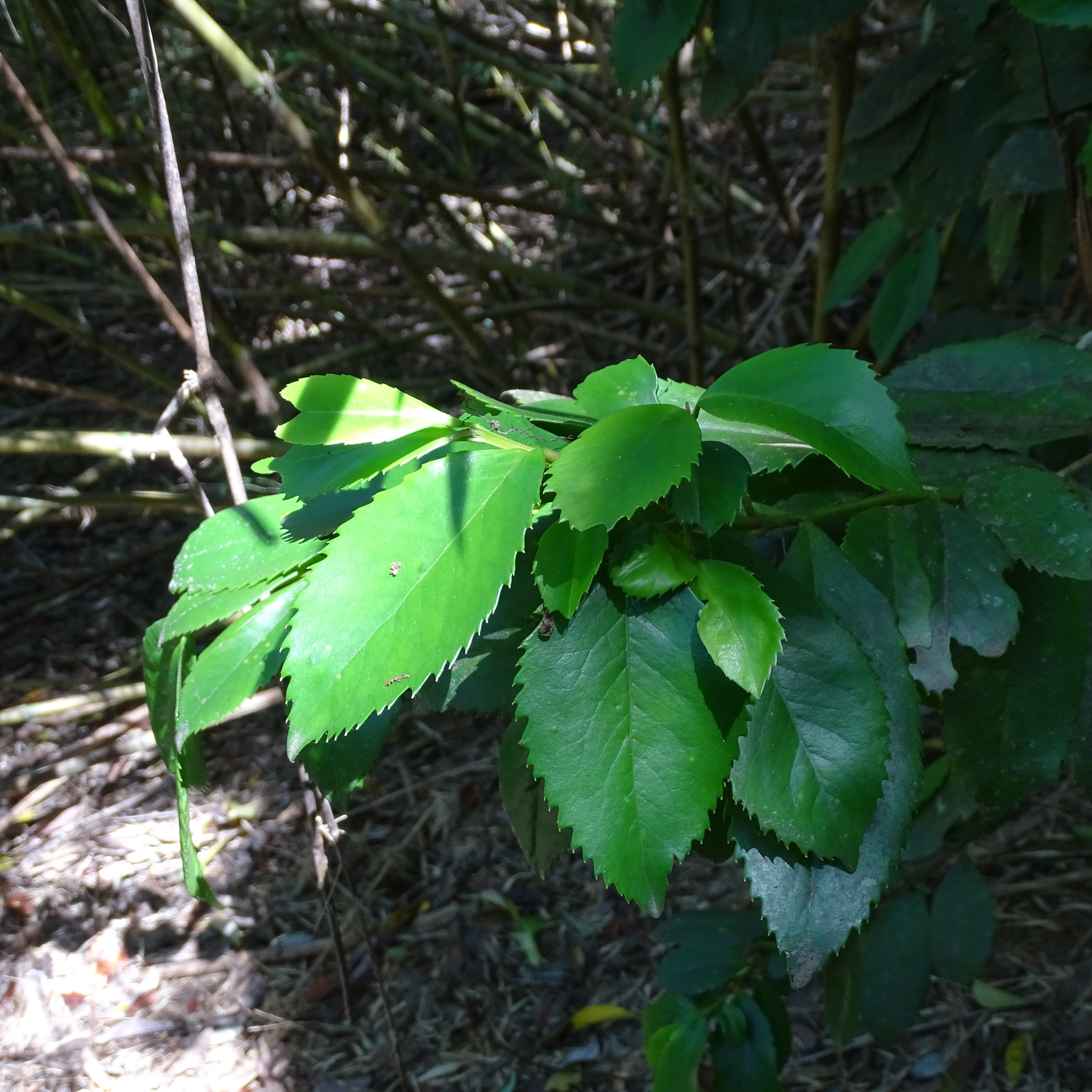

Conservation status
- Least Concern (IUCN 3.1)

Scientific classification
- Kingdom: Plantae
- Clade: Tracheophytes
- Clade: Angiosperms
- Clade: Magnoliids
- Order: Laurales
- Family: Atherospermataceae
- Genus: Laureliopsis; Schodde
- Species: L. philippiana

Binomial name
- Laureliopsis philippiana (Looser) R.Schodde (1983)

Synonyms
- Laurelia philippiana Looser (1934)

= Laureliopsis =

Species of plant

Laureliopsis is a genus of flowering plants with just one species, Laureliopsis philippiana, known as tepa and wawán, endemic to Chile and the narrow neighboring strip of Argentina (35 to 45°S). In Chile it is found from Maule to Aysén. It grows on humid and deep soils.

== Description ==
Laureliopsis philippiana is an evergreen tree up to 30 m (100 ft) tall and 1.4 m (55 in) in diameter, with thin bark, and aromatic wood, and a superficial resemblance to Bay Laurel. The leaves are aromatic, oblong, attenuate at the base, 4.9 long and 1.5–4 cm wide, glossy, leathery, the midrib with yellow hairs, the edges are heavily toothed in the two upper thirds, every tooth ends in a small point. The flowers are hermaphrodite or unisexual, they are small about 5–6 mm long, reddish-green, arranged in racemes, the peduncles are hairy about 2–3 mm long, flowers with bell-shaped perianth split in 7-9 petals more or less equal, hairy outside, 4 stamens and 8-20 staminodes, several carpels, the style is feathery with terminal stigma. The fruit is an achene almost oval, crowned by the perianth, about 1-1.3 cm long, formed by the perigonium that wraps several carpels, hairy, dark brown, spindle-shaped seeds, about 0.8-1.2 cm long, with the style covered by hairs about 5–6 mm long.

== Uses ==
The wood is used in construction, however it rots when exposed to outdoors moisture. It has been planted in Spain.

== Etymology ==
The name Laureliopsis indicates the superficial similarity of the plant to Laurelia. Phillippiana honors Rudolph Amandus Philippi, a German-Chilean naturalist.
