= Ian J. Mason =

Australian ornithologist and taxonomist

Ian James Mason is an Australian ornithologist and taxonomist who has been Senior Collection Manager for the Australian National Wildlife Collection. He is an authority on oology.

Mason, along with Richard Schodde, has been a proponent of one of two differing taxonomic authorities for Australian birds. Mason and Schodde rely more on morphological analysis, while Les Christidis and Walter E. Boles, relying heavily on modern genetic studies, have been proponents of a differing taxonomy.

According to Walter J. Bock, Schodde and Mason "built up the largest current Australian collection of Australian birds with excellent label data at CSIRO-Wildlife in Canberra."

== Publications ==
As well as writing numerous scientific papers, Mason has collaborated on several books about birds.

- 1980 – Nocturnal Birds of Australia. (With Richard Schodde. Illustrations by Jeremy Boot). Lansdowne Editions: Melbourne. (Whitley Medal 1981).
- Schodde, Richard; ——— (1997). Aves: Columbidae to Coraciidae. Zoological Catalogue of Australia. Vol. 37.2. Collingwood: CSIRO. ISBN 0-643-06037-5.
- 1998 – CSIRO List of Australian Vertebrates: A Reference with Conservation Status. (With Richard Schodde, M. Stanger, M Clayton, and J. Wombey). CSIRO Publishing. ISBN 0-643-06256-4
- 1999 – The Directory of Australian Birds: Passerines. A taxonomic and zoogeographic atlas of the biodiversity of birds of Australia and its territories. (With Richard Schodde). CSIRO Publishing. ISBN 0-643-06456-7
- Mason, Ian J.; Pfitzner, Gilbert H. (2020). Passions in ornithology: a century of Australian egg collectors. Canberra: CanPrint Communications Pty Ltd. ISBN 9780646820798.
