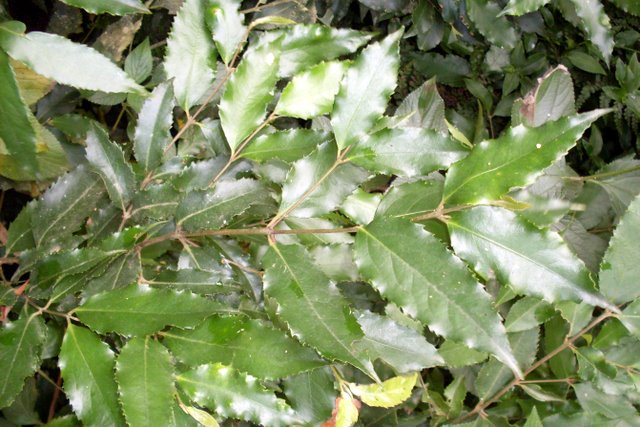
- Daphnandra apatela at its southern limit of distribution, on an alluvial plain at private property, Martinsville, Australia

Scientific classification
- Kingdom: Plantae
- Clade: Tracheophytes
- Clade: Angiosperms
- Clade: Magnoliids
- Order: Laurales
- Family: Atherospermataceae
- Genus: Daphnandra; Benth.

Species
- See text

= Daphnandra =

Genus of flowering plants

Daphnandra is a genus of shrubs and trees in the family Atherospermataceae, or formerly Monimiaceae. The genus is endemic to eastern Australia.

There are seven species native to New South Wales and Queensland:

- Daphnandra apatela Schodde – Socket wood, yellow wood, canary socketwood, satin wood
- Daphnandra dielsii Perkins
- Daphnandra johnsonii Schodde – Illawarra socketwood
- Daphnandra melasmena Schodde – socketwood or black-leaved socketwood
- Daphnandra micrantha (Tul.) Benth. – socketwood or Manning River socketwood
- Daphnandra repandula (F.Muell.) F.Muell. – Sassafras, grey sassafras, northern sassafras, northern yellow sassafras, scentless sassafras, yellow sassafras (synonym of Atherosperma repandulum)
- Daphnandra tenuipes J.R.Perkins – Red-flowered socketwood, socket sassafras

The generic name Daphnandra refers to a similarity of the anthers of the bay laurel. Greek daphne refers to the bay laurel, and andros 'man'.
