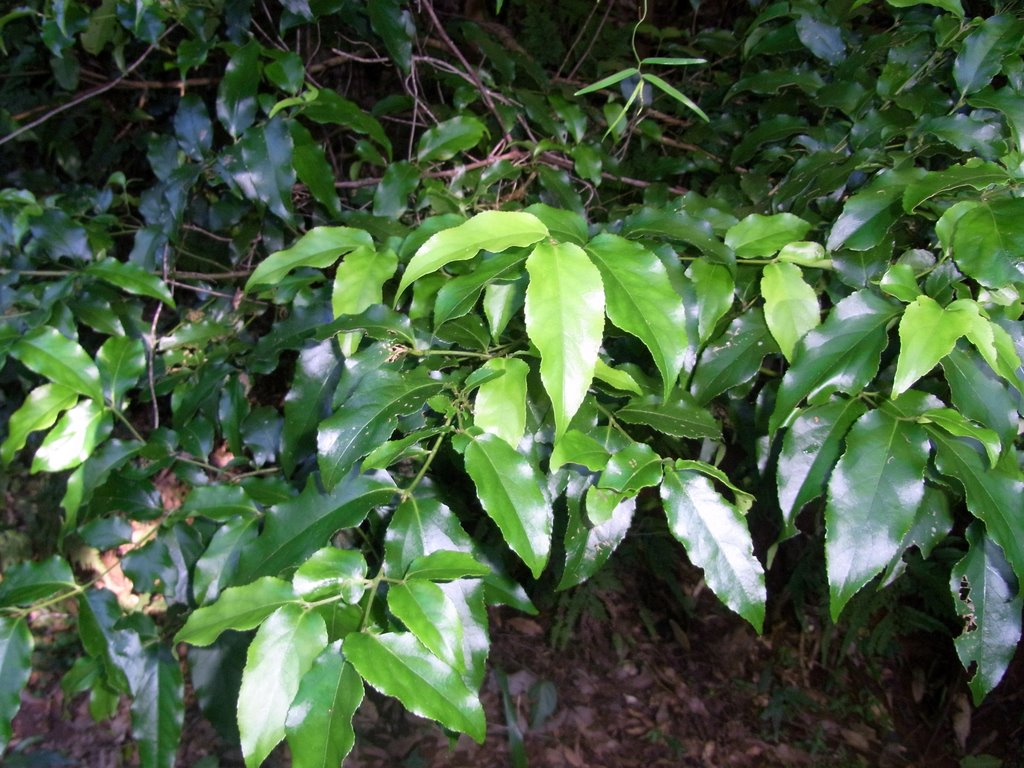
- At League Scrub, NSW

Scientific classification
- Kingdom: Plantae
- Clade: Tracheophytes
- Clade: Angiosperms
- Clade: Magnoliids
- Order: Laurales
- Family: Atherospermataceae
- Genus: Daphnandra
- Species: D. melasmena

Binomial name
- Daphnandra melasmena Schodde

= Daphnandra melasmena =

Species of tree

Daphnandra melasmena, commonly known as the socketwood, or black-leaved socketwood is a rainforest tree in eastern Australia. It grows on the more fertile basaltic soils, often associated with the white booyong. It is found from near Bowraville, New South Wales in the south to the Tweed Valley further north. A small to medium-sized tree growing to 20 metres tall with a stem diameter of 30 cm.

Daphnandra melasmena was first described by Richard Schodde in 2000, having been known previously as Daphnandra sp. D. The specific epithet melasmena is derived from the Ancient Greek, referring to the leaves and stems turning black on drying.
