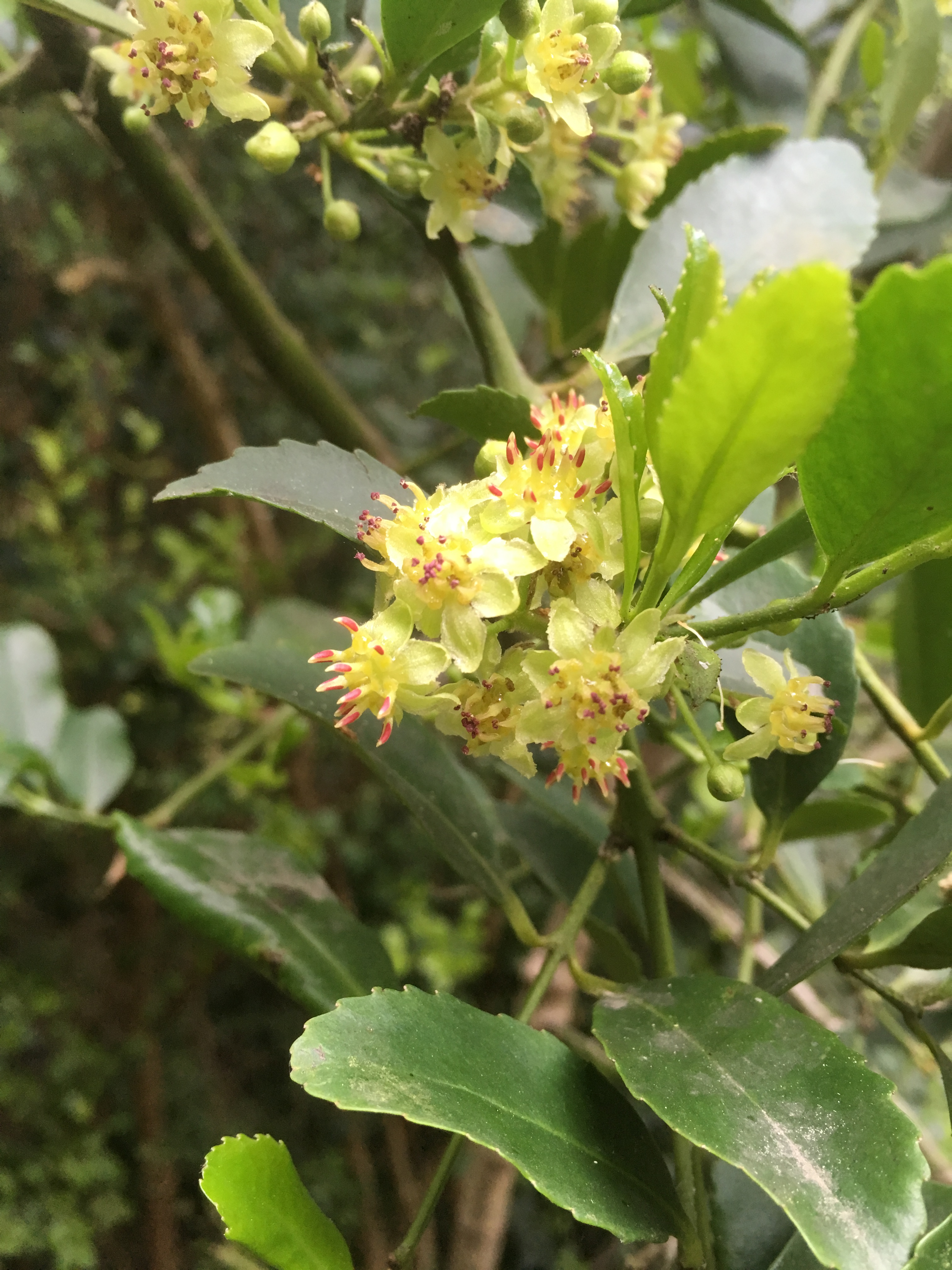

Conservation status
- Near Threatened (IUCN 2.3)

Scientific classification
- Kingdom: Plantae
- Clade: Tracheophytes
- Clade: Angiosperms
- Clade: Magnoliids
- Order: Laurales
- Family: Atherospermataceae
- Genus: Laurelia
- Species: L. sempervirens

Binomial name
- Laurelia sempervirens (Ruiz & Pav.) Tul.

Synonyms
- Atherosperma sempervirens (Ruiz & Pav.) Baill.; Laurelia aromatica Juss. ex Poir.; Laurelia serrata Bertero; Pavonia sempervirens Ruiz & Pav.; Theyga chilensis Molina; Thiga chilensis Molina

= Laurelia sempervirens =

Species of plant

Laurelia sempervirens is a species of evergreen tree in the family Atherospermataceae (formerly Monimiaceae). Common names include Peruvian nutmeg, tihue or trihue (from the Mapuche language), and Chilean laurel or Chilean sassafras.

It is endemic to Chile, occurring at 34–41° south latitude. It requires a warm subtropical to tropical climate that is cool but also frost-free or with only very slight winter frosts not below −4 °C (25 °F), with high summer heat, rainfall and humidity. It grows best on well-drained, slightly acidic soils rich in organic matter. This is typical laurel forest habitat. However, the southern hemisphere genus Laurelia is not closely related to the laurels (Lauraceae), despite the similarity.

The tree is known as triwe in Huilliche and laurel in Spanish. It is the ritual tree of the Huilliche people of Futahuillimapu.

== Description ==
The tihue is a large (up to 30 m (98 ft) tall and 2 m (6.6 ft) in diameter) evergreen tree with smooth, pale yellow bark. The bark cracks when ageing, coming off in roughly circular plates. The wood and the leaves are strongly aromatic. The bright green leaves are arranged in opposite pairs, and are oblong in shape, narrowed at the base. The leaves are leathery, shiny, 5–10 cm (2.0–3.9 in) long and 2.5–5 cm (0.98–1.97 in) wide. The serrated edges of the leaves help to distinguish this tree from the closely related Laureliopsis philippiana, which has more deeply toothed leaf margins.

The tihue bears bundles of small yellow unisexual flowers, both male and female on every tree (monoecious). The fruit is a greenish achene with seeds bearing feathery anemophilous filaments. The seed is dispersed by the wind (anemochory).

== Cultivation and uses ==
Its wood is pale yellow in colour, with a fine and homogeneous texture: the growth rings are not conspicuous. The tree is threatened by habitat loss. It has been introduced into Spain and into Cornwall and planted in Sussex in the UK. The leaves of Laurelia sempervirens were used by Mapuche Amerindians for treating headache and as a diuretic.
