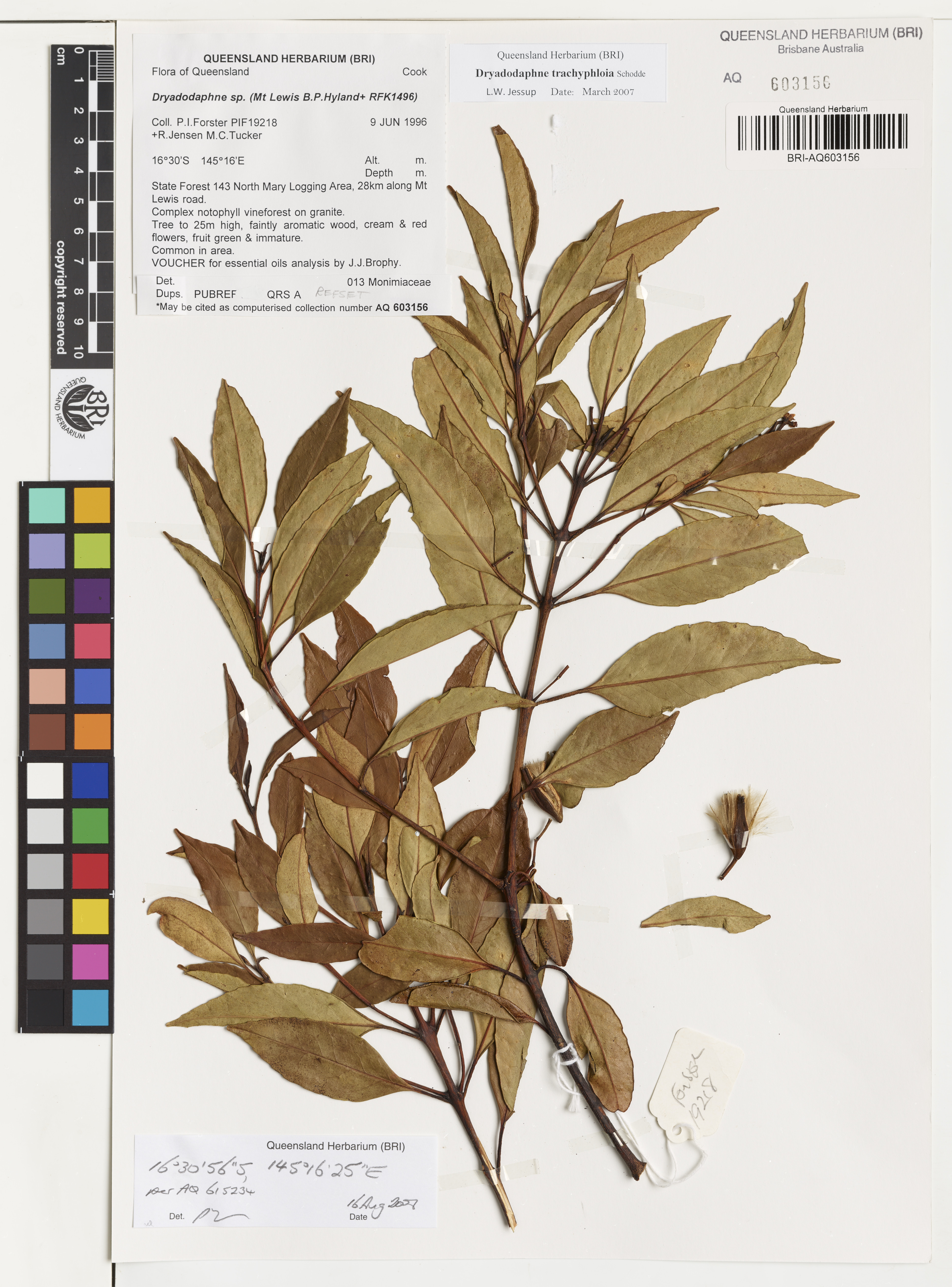
- Herbarium specimen

Conservation status
- Least Concern (IUCN 3.1)

Scientific classification
- Kingdom: Plantae
- Clade: Embryophytes
- Clade: Tracheophytes
- Clade: Spermatophytes
- Clade: Angiosperms
- Clade: Magnoliids
- Order: Laurales
- Family: Atherospermataceae
- Genus: Dryadodaphne
- Species: D. trachyphloia

Binomial name
- Dryadodaphne trachyphloia Schodde

= Dryadodaphne trachyphloia =

Species of flowering plant

Dryadodaphne trachyphloia, commonly known as grey sassafras, is a species of plant in the family Atherospermataceae. It is endemic to a small area in the Wet Tropics bioregion of Queensland, Australia.

== Description ==
Dryadodaphne trachyphloia is a large buttressed tree reaching up to 45 m (148 ft) tall. The leaves are arranged in opposite pairs on the twigs and usually grow up to 11 cm (4.3 in) long and 4 cm (1.6 in) wide, occasionally reaching 17 cm (6.7 in) long. Their shape varies from linear to lanceolate to elliptic. They have shallow rounded teeth on their margins and the lateral veins are difficult to see.

Inflorescences are panicles and arise from the leaf axils or at the ends of the branches. At maturity the flowers are about 10 mm (0.4 in) wide. The eight tepals are greenish cream and have reddish marks on the inner surface. The fruit is a plumed achene contained within a capsule-like receptacle.

== Taxonomy ==
It was first described in 2007 by Australian botanist Richard Schodde. The description was published in the multi-volume book Flora of Australia.

Prior to its formal description, this species was known by the temporary phrase name "Dryadodaphne sp. 'Mt Lewis' (B.P.Hyland+ RFK1496)". The name Dryadodaphne novoguineensis, a species from New Guinea, had also been misapplied to this plant.

== Distribution and habitat ==
It grows in well-developed rainforest, often beside creeks, and it is restricted to the Mount Lewis and Mount Spurgeon area northwest of Cairns It occurs at altitudes from 400 to 1,400 m (1,300 to 4,600 ft).

== Conservation status ==
As of June 2026, this species has been assessed to be of least concern by the International Union for Conservation of Nature (IUCN) and by the Queensland Government under its Nature Conservation Act.

== Gallery ==
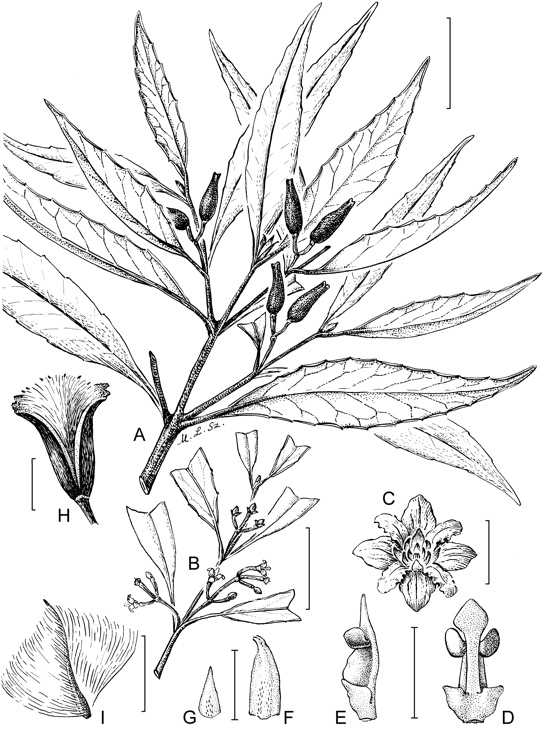
Sketch showing leaves, flower parts and fruit

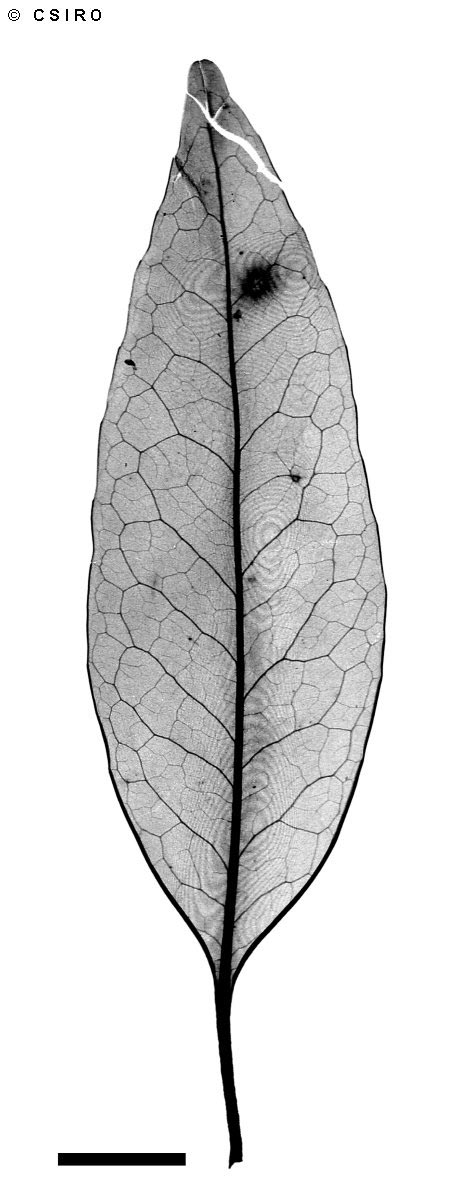
X-ray of a leaf
