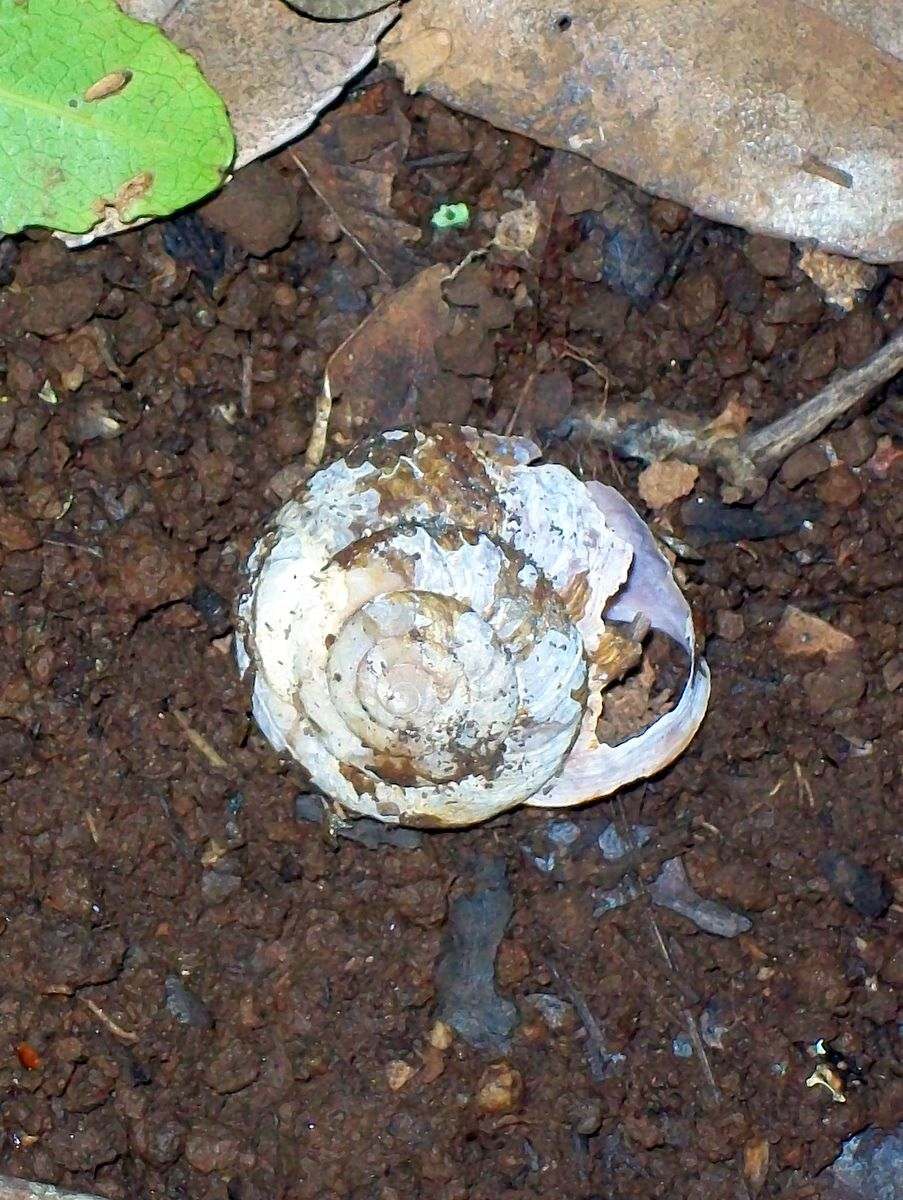
- An acid-eroded shell of Pommerhelix monacha in the Mount Wilson rainforest, Blue Mountains National Park, Australia

Scientific classification
- Kingdom: Animalia
- Phylum: Mollusca
- Class: Gastropoda
- Order: Stylommatophora
- Family: Camaenidae
- Genus: Pommerhelix
- Species: P. monacha

Binomial name
- Pommerhelix monacha (Pfeiffer, 1859)

Synonyms
- Badistes bowdenae; Galaxias monacha; Hadra monacha; Helix monacha Pfeiffer, 1859; Helix cailleti Crosse, 1864; Helix cailleti pallidior Crosse, 1864; Helix (Pomatia) monacha; Helix (Dorcasia) cailleti; Helix (Badistes) monacha; Helix (Badistes) cailleti; Meridolum bowdenae McLauchlan, 1951 (nomen nudum); Sauroconcha bowdenae (McLauchlan, 1954); Thersites cailleti

= Pommerhelix monacha =

Species of gastropod

Pommerhelix monacha is a species of air-breathing land snail, a terrestrial pulmonate gastropod mollusc in the family Camaenidae.

This species is found in eastern Australia.

== Distribution ==
This snail is found in high altitude rainforests in Blue Mountains, central eastern New South Wales, Australia.

The type locality is "Australia", which can be specified to Sassafras Gully, Springwood, New South Wales, Australia.

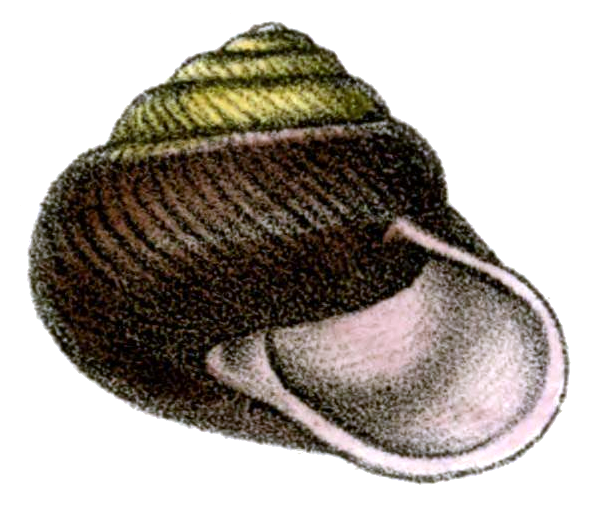
Apertural view of a shell of Pommerhelix monacha

== Description ==
The shell of Pommerhelix monacha is subglobose (almost round). The shell has 5.6–6.0 whorls. The color of the shell is dark brown to black, but it can also be dark red or purple in colour. The shell sculpture consists of zigzag ridges combined with small ridges on the periostracum. The umbilicus is closed. The aperture is roundly ovate in shape.

The width of the shell is 26.2-30.3 mm. The height of the shell is 18.1-23.2 mm.

The visible soft parts are a yellowish grey in colour: the body is grey to dark grey and the mantle is dark yellow or orange.

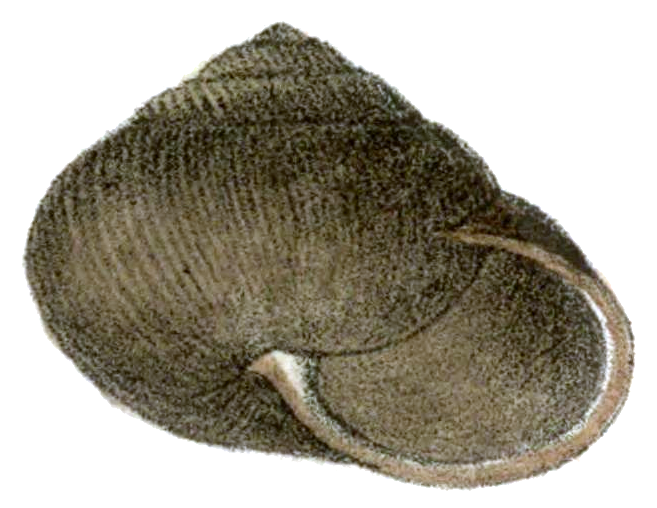
An apertural view of a shell of Pommerhelix monacha

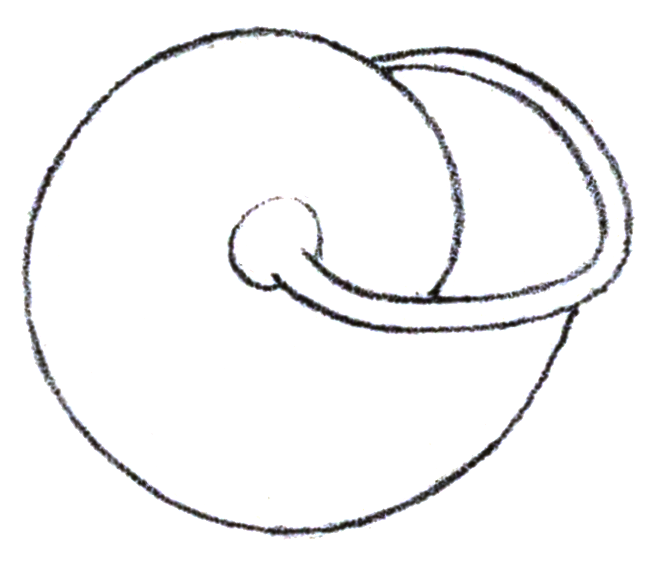
An umbilical view of a shell of Pommerhelix monacha
