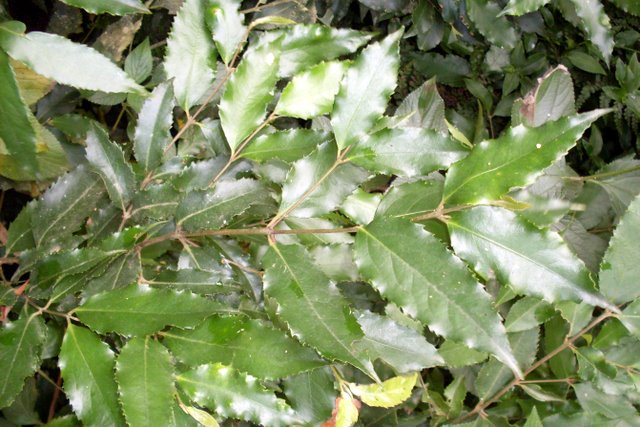
- At Martinsville, NSW

Conservation status
- Least Concern (IUCN 3.1)

Scientific classification
- Kingdom: Plantae
- Clade: Tracheophytes
- Clade: Angiosperms
- Clade: Magnoliids
- Order: Laurales
- Family: Atherospermataceae
- Genus: Daphnandra
- Species: D. apatela

Binomial name
- Daphnandra apatela Schodde

= Daphnandra apatela =

Species of tree

Daphnandra apatela, the socketwood, light yellowwood or canary socketwood is a common rainforest tree in eastern Australia. It grows in the more fertile alluvial soils and basaltic soils. Distributed from the Watagan Mountains (31° S) in New South Wales to Miriam Vale (24° S) near Gladstone in Queensland.

== Naming & taxonomy ==
Daphnandra apatela is a member of the ancient Gondwana family Atherospermataceae, the southern sassafrases. It was formerly considered Daphnandra micrantha, the Australian socketwood; however, it has been recognised as a separate species, as published by Richard Schodde. The generic name Daphnandra refers to a similarity of the anthers of the bay laurel: the Greek daphne refers to the bay laurel, and andros 'man'. The species name apatela is from the Greek 'to deceive', because of the similarity to Daphnandra micrantha. A feature where larger branchlets meet the main trunk resembles a ball-and-socket joint, hence the common name of socketwood. Canary socketwood or light yellowwood refers to the colour of the timber.

== Description ==
Daphnandra apatela is a medium to large tree, sometimes exceeding 30 metres tall with a trunk diameter of up to 75 cm. Horizontal branches form a dense crown. The base of the stem is sometimes flanged, but not buttressed. The bark is grey and somewhat rough, with raised corky bumps. The bark contains alkaloids which have a similar effect to strychnine, though milder. Small branches are covered in downy hairs, flattened when joining to the main branches. A ball-and-socket type joint occurs where larger branchlets join the main stem.

=== Leaves ===
Leaves feature about 20 teeth on each side and are opposite on the stem. The base of the leaf is not toothed. Leaves are 3 to 8 cm long, 1.5 to 4 cm wide. The midrib is raised or flattened on the top surface, and raised below. Leaf venation is more evident below the leaf. Two to seven lateral veins extend from the midrib on each side. The green-coloured leaf stem is 3 to 8 mm long.

=== Flowers and fruit ===
Flowers appear from September to October, being white in small panicles. They are 8 mm in diameter on short stalks. The fruit is a capsule covered in fine brown hair, egg shaped, round or sometimes asymmetrical, and 12–25 mm long. Fruit matures from December to February, or as late as May. Regeneration from fresh seeds yields a success rate of 10% after 24 days.
