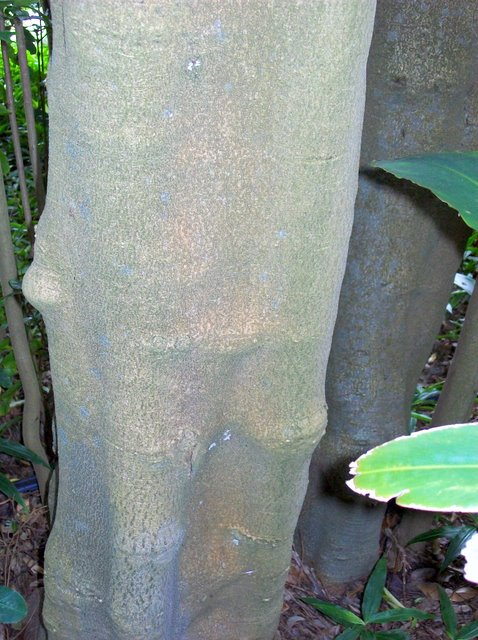
- Trunk

Conservation status
- Least Concern (IUCN 3.1)

Scientific classification
- Kingdom: Plantae
- Clade: Tracheophytes
- Clade: Angiosperms
- Clade: Magnoliids
- Order: Laurales
- Family: Atherospermataceae
- Genus: Daphnandra
- Species: D. micrantha

Binomial name
- Daphnandra micrantha (Tul.) Benth.

Synonyms
- Atherosperma micranthum Tul.

= Daphnandra micrantha =

Manning River socketwood

Species of tree

Daphnandra micrantha, known as socketwood or Manning River socketwood, is a rainforest tree in eastern Australia. It grows near streams in various types of rainforest, and is also seen in ecotone areas dominated by brush box and tallowwood. It is restricted to the Manning and Hastings River valleys (31° S) of New South Wales.

== Naming and taxonomy ==
Daphnandra micrantha is a member of the ancient Gondwana family Atherospermataceae, the southern sassafrases. Previously considered one species, it is now published as four different types of socketwood by Richard Schodde. The generic name Daphnandra refers to a similarity of the anthers of the bay laurel: Greek daphne refers to the bay laurel, and andros 'man'. The specific epithet micrantha from the Greek refers to small flowers. A feature of Daphnandra apatela is the larger branchlets meeting the main trunk in what resembles a ball-and-socket joint. Hence the common name of socketwood for this group of trees.

== Description ==
A small to medium-sized tree, sometimes reaching 20 metres tall and with a trunk diameter of 25 cm. The bark is fawnish cream in colour, with vertical cracks. The small branches lack the soft downy hairs of other socketwood types. Branchlets are flattened where they join the main stem.

=== Leaves ===
Leaves are opposite on the stem, 7 to 17 cm long, 1 to 5 cm wide, and finely toothed with approximately 14 teeth per side. The midrib is raised below the leaf, but sunken above. There are five pairs of lateral veins, which are more evident below the leaf. Leaf stems are 3 to 8 mm long.

=== Flowers and fruit ===
Small flowers form from June to October, being greenish white or pinkish green. The fruit is a woody receptacle that splits in two, releasing hairy windblown achenes with one seed.

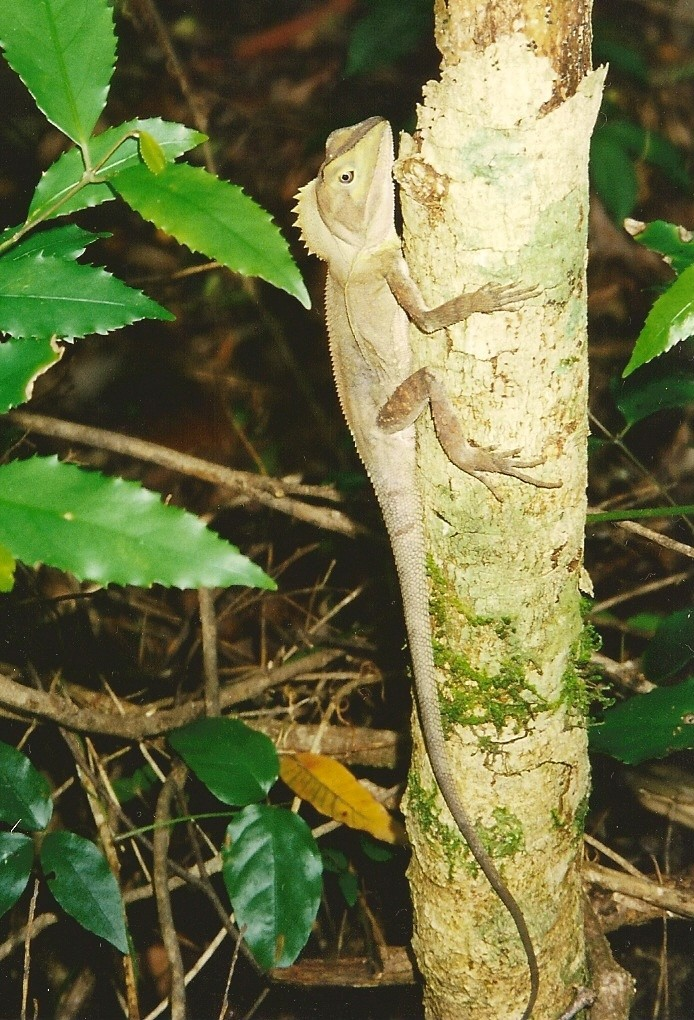
Southern angle-headed dragon and Manning river socketwood leaves at Boorganna Nature Reserve, NSW
