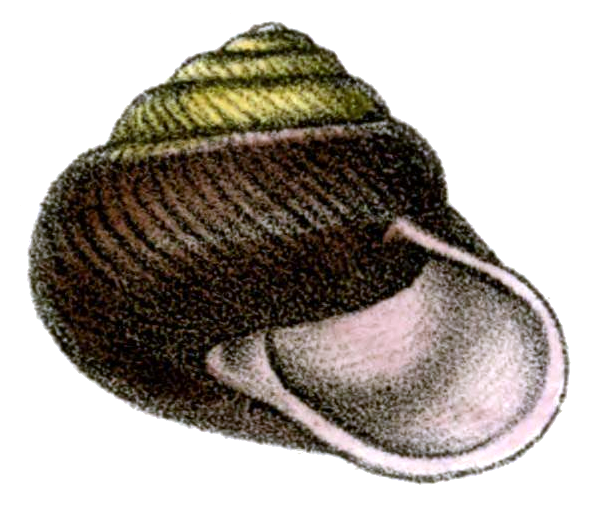
- Apertural view of a shell of Pommerhelix monacha

Scientific classification
- Kingdom: Animalia
- Phylum: Mollusca
- Class: Gastropoda
- Order: Stylommatophora
- Infraorder: Helicoidei
- Superfamily: Helicoidea
- Family: Camaenidae
- Genus: Pommerhelix; S.A. Clark, 2009

Type species
- Pommerhelix carmelae S. A. Clark, 2009

= Pommerhelix =

Genus of gastropods

Pommerhelix is a genus of air-breathing land snails, terrestrial pulmonate gastropod molluscs in the subfamily Hadrinae of the family Camaenidae.

== Species ==
Species within the genus Pommerhelix include:

- Pommerhelix carmelae S. A. Clark, 2009
- Pommerhelix depressa (Hedley, 1901)
- Pommerhelix duralensis (Cox, 1868)
- Pommerhelix exocarpi (Cox, 1868)
- Pommerhelix insularis S. A. Clark, 2009
- Pommerhelix mastersi (Cox, 1864)
- Pommerhelix monacha (Pfeiffer, 1859)
- Pommerhelix stanisici S. A. Clark, 2009
