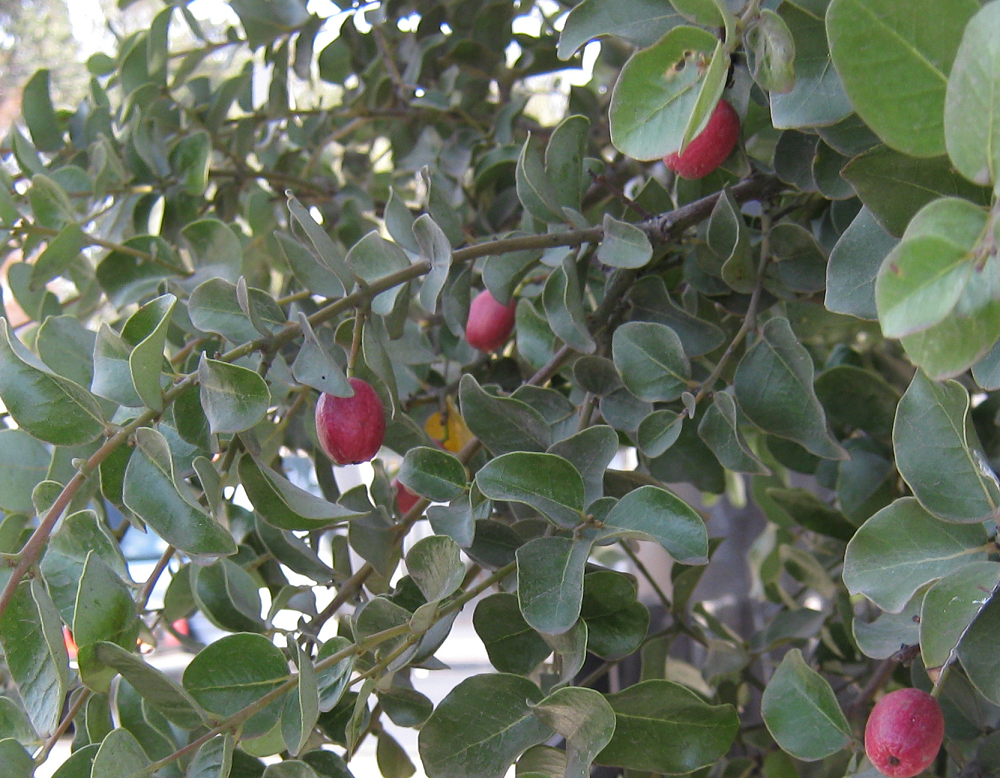

Conservation status
- Least Concern (IUCN 3.1)

Scientific classification
- Kingdom: Plantae
- Clade: Tracheophytes
- Clade: Angiosperms
- Clade: Magnoliids
- Order: Laurales
- Family: Lauraceae
- Genus: Cryptocarya
- Species: C. alba

Binomial name
- Cryptocarya alba (Molina) Looser

Synonyms
- Cryptocarya boldus Pax; Cryptocarya laxiflora (Phil. ex Mez) Phil.; Cryptocarya mammosa (Molina) Kosterm.; Cryptocarya peumo (Dombey ex Lam.) Kosterm., not validly publ.; Cryptocarya peumus (Molina) Nees; Cryptocarya peumus var. laxiflora Phil. ex Mez; Cryptocarya peumus var. stenantha (Phil.) Mez; Cryptocarya rubra (Molina) Skeels, nom. illeg. homonym. post.; Cryptocarya stenantha Phil.; Icosandra rufescens Phil.; Laurus peumo Ruiz & Pav., nom. illeg. homonym. post.; Laurus peumo Dombey ex Lam.; Laurus peumus Molina; Peumus alba Molina (1782) (basionym); Peumus mammosa Molina; Peumus rubra Molina

= Cryptocarya alba =

Species of plant

Cryptocarya alba, the peumo or Chilean acorn, is an evergreen tree that grows in central Chile from 33 to 40° southern latitude, with the southernmost distribution in northern Los Lagos Region. It can live both in wet and in dry conditions. Its distribution can reach up to 1500 meters (5000 ft) above sea level. It measures up to 20 meters (65 ft) height and one meter diameter, with cracked gray bark. An associate tree is the endangered Chilean Wine Palm, Jubaea chilensis, which species prehistorically had a much wider range.

== Description ==
Leaves are perennial, aromatic, simple, alternate and opposite, 2.5 to 8.5 cm long and one to four cm wide; egg-shaped and entire lobe, a little undulate. The trunk is straight and hardly twisted; brown-grayish cork cambium, relatively smooth, with few cracks and detachable scales when old. Central branches thick and ascending; terminal twigs thin and hanging. The flowers are in dense bunches, greenish yellow and three to four mm long; hermaphrodite, they have six fleshy uneven and hairy petals. It produces edible fruits red-colored, called "peumos", which contain large heavy seeds, which germinate easily.

== Cultivation and uses ==
It has very scented leaves. The fruit is a red berry and is edible. It blooms from November to January (southern hemisphere). The wood is very hard and resistant to moisture. The bark is used for tanning leather and dying orange color. It is appreciated as ornamental and fruit-producing tree. Planted trees in northern California have done very well. Rarely seen in Spain, it has adapted perfectly in that country.
