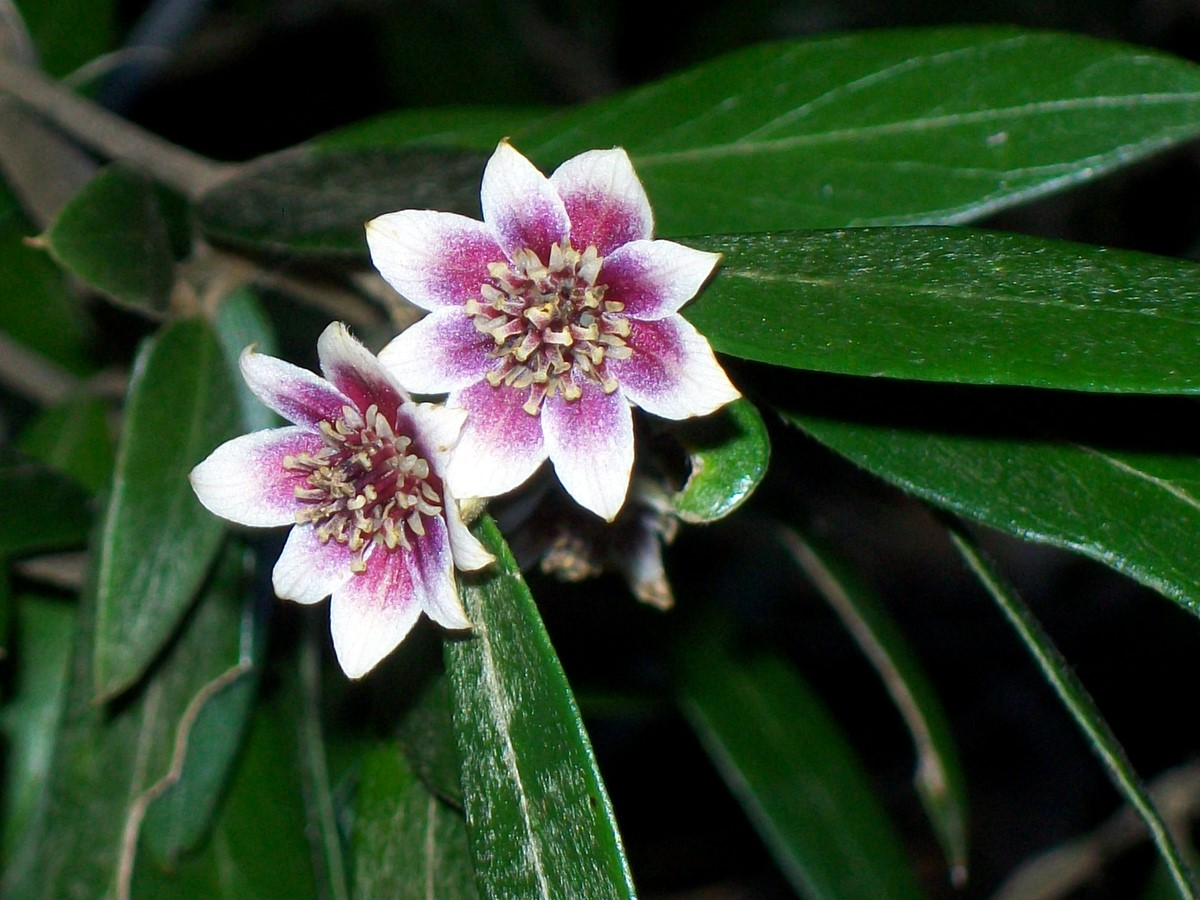
- Atherosperma moschatum subsp. integrifolium

Scientific classification
- Kingdom: Plantae
- Clade: Embryophytes
- Clade: Tracheophytes
- Clade: Spermatophytes
- Clade: Angiosperms
- Clade: Magnoliids
- Order: Laurales
- Family: Atherospermataceae; R.Br.

Genera
- Atherosperma Labill.; Daphnandra Benth.; Doryphora Endl.; Dryadodaphne S.Moore; Laurelia Juss.; Laureliopsis Schodde; Nemuaron Baill.; †Atherospermoxylon; †Laurelites

= Atherospermataceae =

Atherospermataceae Temporal range: Coniacian - recent

Family of flowering plants

The Atherospermataceae, commonly known as the southern sassafrases, are a family of broadleaf evergreen trees and shrubs. The family includes 14 species in seven genera. The atherosperms are today mostly distributed in the Southern Hemisphere, with two species native to southern Chile and 12 species native to Australasia. Wood is commercially harvested from rainforest species of this family, and is used both in construction and in fine cabinet making.

== Ecology ==
These trees and shrubs are characteristic of the lower strata of the tropical rainforest, except Dryadodaphne species, which belong to the rainforest high canopy. The glands at the base of the stamens secrete nectar in Laurelia novae-zelandiae, which accumulates at the base of the flower and attracts bees, beetles and bee flies. The seed, in the form of a feathery achene, is dispersed by wind (anemochory).

The wood of Laurelia has local interest for construction, particularly the Chilean Laurelia sempervirens, despite its lack of resistance to moisture. Essential oils extracted from the leaves and bark of species of Doryphora have application in perfumery and pharmaceuticals.

== Evolution ==
The Atherospermataceae have in the past been treated as a subfamily (Atherospermatoideae) of the Monimiaceae. Recent reassessment of both morphological and molecular characters, however, show them to be more clearly related to the Gomortegaceae and Siparunaceae. The Angiosperm Phylogeny Website considers them to be a family of their own (as the Atherospermataceae), and together with the Gomortegaceae and Siparunaceae form a distinct branch of the Laurales.

A clade made up of Doryphora and Daphnandra, from the Australian states of Queensland and New South Wales, is considered sister to the rest of the family. The remaining genera (Atherosperma, Dryadodaphne, Laurelia, Laureliopsis, and Nemuaron) are considered by some to be more advanced evolutionarily.

- Atherospermataceae
  - - Daphnandra
    - Doryphora
  - - - Dryadodaphne
      - - Atherosperma
        - Nemuaron
    - - Laureliopsis
      - Laurelia

The atherosperm fossil record, which goes back to the Upper Cretaceous, includes pollen, wood, and leaf fossils from Europe, Africa, South America, Antarctica, New Zealand, and Tasmania. The family is recognized in Antarctic fossils from the Cretaceous to the lower Tertiary (about 88 Mya). Fossil pollen of Laurelia has been attributed to the middle Oligocene of New Zealand, as well as the Eocene-Oligocene and Early Miocene of Argentina and Seymour Island. Calibration of rbcL substitution rates within the fossils suggests an initial diversification of the family at 100–140 Mya, probably in West Gondwana, early entry into Antarctica, and long-distance dispersal to New Zealand and New Caledonia at 50–30 Mya by the ancestors of Laurelia novae-zelandiae and Nemuaron.

== Species ==
- Atherosperma moschatum Labill. – Tasmania, Victoria and New South Wales
  - Atherosperma moschatum subsp. integrifolium (A.Cunn. ex Tul.) Schodde – New South Wales
- Daphnandra apatela Schodde – Queensland and New South Wales
- Daphnandra dielsii Perkins – Queensland
- Daphnandra johnsonii Schodde – New South Wales
- Daphnandra melasmena Schodde – New South Wales
- Daphnandra micrantha (Tul.) Benth. – New South Wales
- Daphnandra repandula (F.Muell.) F.Muell. – Queensland
- Daphnandra tenuipes Perkins – New South Wales
- Doryphora aromatica (F.M.Bailey) L.S.Sm. – northeast Queensland
- Doryphora sassafras Endl. – Queensland and New South Wales
- Dryadodaphne crassa Schodde ex Philipson – New Guinea
- Dryadodaphne novoguineensis (G.Perkins) A.C.Sm. – New Guinea
- Dryadodaphne trachyphloia Schodde – Queensland
- Laurelia novae-zelandiae A.Cunn. – New Zealand
- Laurelia sempervirens (Ruiz & Pav.) Tul. – southern Chile
- Laureliopsis philippiana (Looser) Schodde – southern Chile and Argentina
- Nemuaron vieillardii (Baill.) Baill. – New Caledonia
