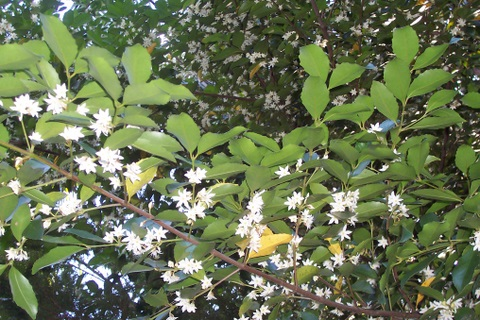
- Doryphora sassafras

Scientific classification
- Kingdom: Plantae
- Clade: Tracheophytes
- Clade: Angiosperms
- Clade: Magnoliids
- Order: Laurales
- Family: Atherospermataceae
- Genus: Doryphora; Endl.

= Doryphora =

Genus of flowering plants

Doryphora is a genus of 2 species of flowering plants in the family Atherospermataceae that are endemic to Australia. Plants in the genus Doryphora are medium-sized to tall trees with glabrous, leathery, sometimes serrated leaves, and flowers usually arranged in groups of 3, each flower with both make and female parts, usually 4 or 6 tepals, 6 stamens and 6 to 12 carpels.

== Description ==
Plants in the genus Doryphora are medium-sized to tall trees with aromatic bark and leaves. The leaves af glabrous, leathery and sometimes deeply serrated. The flowers are bisexual, usually borne in groups of 3 in leaf axils, with large bracts covering the flower, but falling off as the flower matures. Each flower has a bell-shaped hypanthium, usually 4 or 6 tepals, six male stamens, 6 to 12 staminodes, and 6 to 12 carpels. The fruit is oval to cylindrical or urn-shaped, and splits into 2 to 4 equal valves.

== Taxonomy ==
The genus Doryphora was first formally described in 1837 by Stephan Endlicher in Genera Plantarum Secundum Ordines Naturales Disposita, and the first species he described (the type species) was Doryphora sassafras. The name of the genus means "spear-carrier", a reference to the prominent appendages on the anthers.

=== List of species ===
The following is a list of Doryphora species accepted by Plants of the World Online as at May 2024:

- Doryphora aromatica (Bailey) L.S.Sm. (northeast Queensland)
- Doryphora sassafras Endl. (east Queensland and New South Wales)
