= Richard Weatherly =

Australian environmentalist

Richard Weatherly OAM (born 1947) is an Australian environmentalist and artist specialising in natural history subjects, especially birds.

Weatherly spent his childhood on a sheep and cattle station in western Victoria. While he was studying at Cambridge University he began his career as a wildlife artist with an exhibition of wood carvings at the Moreland Gallery in London in 1969. After solo exhibitions in London, and travels in Zimbabwe where he assisted in wildlife research, he returned to Australia where he became the Foundation President of the Society of Wildlife Artists of Australasia.

From 1977 to 1981 Weatherly undertook extensive fieldwork in Australia and New Guinea with ornithologist Richard Schodde, visiting the habitats of, and studying, all species of malurid wrens, in preparation for an important monograph. This work, with the text by Schodde and illustrations by Weatherly, was published in 1982.

In the early 1990s he was invited by the ANARE to participate in the Ecosystem Monitoring Project for the Commission for the Conservation of Antarctic Marine Living Resources. Consequently, he spent several months based at Mawson Station in Antarctica, setting up the research project and studying Adelie penguins.

As well as travelling extensively, Weatherly lives and works at Connewarran in western Victoria, the area where he was brought up. He served as inaugural Chairman of Watershed 2000 a project which involves the wider community in the management of their catchment area, part of which is the restoration and management of 800,000 ha of habitat to act as a 200 km connection between the Otway Ranges and the Grampians Ranges in western Victoria. He is an Honorary Associate in ornithology at the National Museum of Victoria.
