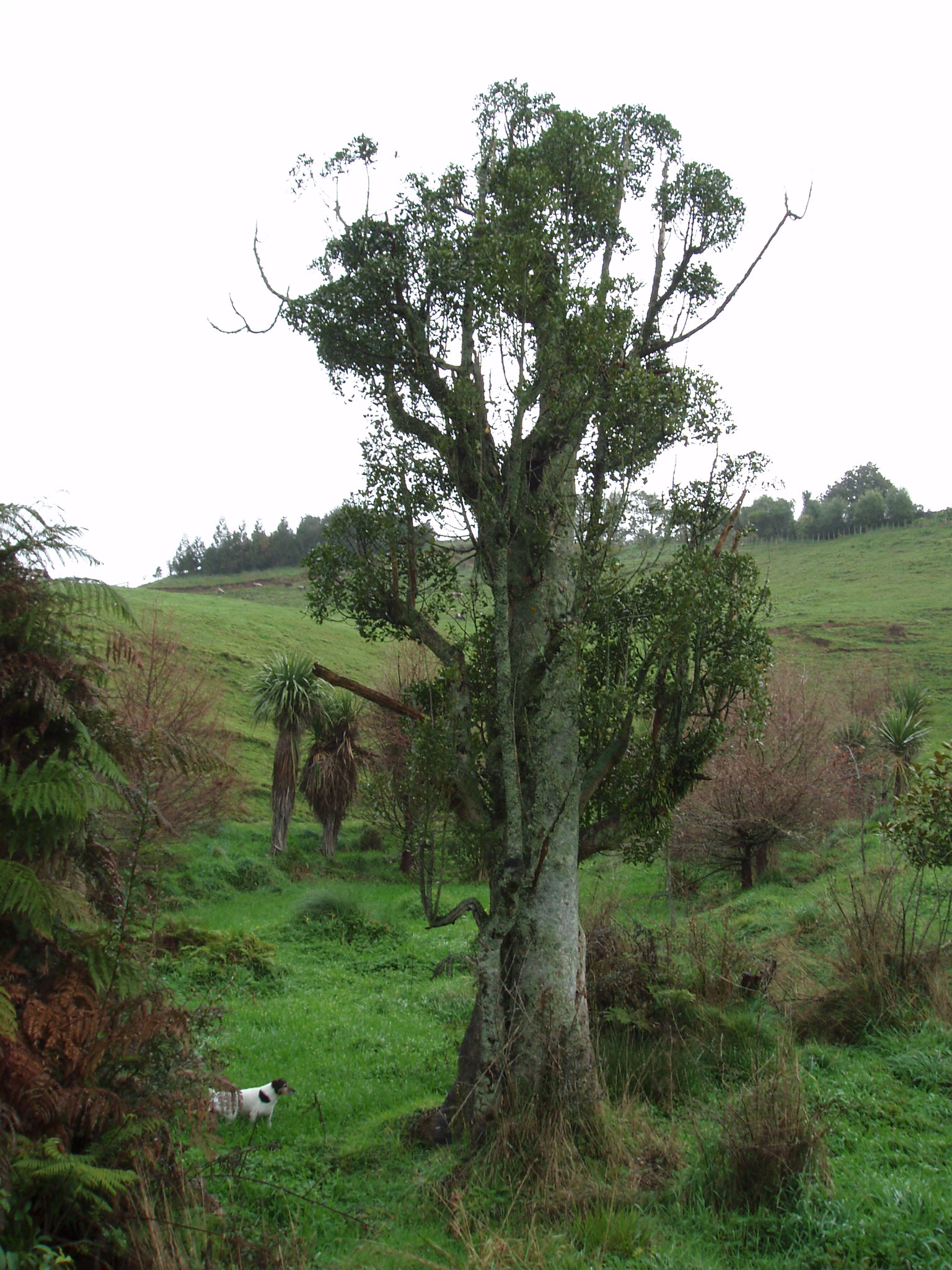

Conservation status
- Least Concern (IUCN 3.1)

Scientific classification
- Kingdom: Plantae
- Clade: Tracheophytes
- Clade: Angiosperms
- Clade: Magnoliids
- Order: Laurales
- Family: Atherospermataceae
- Genus: Laurelia
- Species: L. novae-zelandiae

Binomial name
- Laurelia novae-zelandiae A.Cunn.

= Laurelia novae-zelandiae =

Pukatea

Species of tree endemic to New Zealand

Laurelia novae-zelandiae, commonly known as pukatea, is a large evergreen tree, endemic to the forests of New Zealand. Pukatea has 'toothed' leaves and produces small flowers. It is a species in the Atherospermataceae (formerly Monimiaceae) family, and a typical representative of the laurel forest ecoregion.

== Taxonomy and name ==
The taxon was first described by Allan Cunningham in 1838. The species is the only member of Laurelia found in New Zealand.

The name pukatea is a Polynesian word applied to a great number of plants, including Hernandia nymphaeifolia and Pisonia grandis. The element puka is used to describe a wide variety of plants, including Meryta sinclairii.

== Distribution ==
Pukatea is endemic to New Zealand. It is generally found in lowland forest and grows throughout the North Island of New Zealand, and the northern third of the South Island, usually where moisture is plentiful, such as in damp, lowland forests, gullies, and on the edges of streams.

Pukatea grows well in poorly drained soil, but is equally at home on hillsides. It requires a temperate to warm subtropical climate, but also a frost-free environment with only very slight winter frosts not below −4 °C (25 °F), and with high summer heat. Growth is best on well-drained, slightly acidic soils rich in organic matter.

== Description ==
Pukatea grows slowly to a height of 40 m (130 ft), usually 35 m (115 ft), and is the only New Zealand native tree developing large plank buttresses to support the tree's growth in swamp or shallow-soil areas. Laurelia novae-zelandiae has specialised respiratory root structures called pneumatophores in certain waterlogged ground or mud. These fragrant trees are characteristic of the lower strata of the tropical rainforest. The tree has thin bark and a pale brownish-grey trunk that becomes attractively buttressed at the base. Its dark green, glossy, elliptical leaves are 5–7 cm (2.0–2.8 in) long and have coarsely serrated edges and paler undersides. The odorous opposite leaves have oil cells in the parenchyma, and brochidodromous venations. Juvenile leaves and stems can be difficult to distinguish from another native tree hutu, to which it is only distantly related. Pukatea is a mostly dioecious species, male and female flowers are on separate individuals. Some specimens had a ratio as high as 100 male flowers to every female or hermaphrodite one. These results suggest that the species is not truly dioecious. The female and hermaphrodite flowers are very similar. The flowers are tiny, inconspicuous, and in small racemes. The star-shaped flowers are light with yellow glistening glands and scarlet anther flaps. The glands at the base of the stamens in Laurelia novae-zelandiae secrete nectar that accumulates at the base of the flower. This attracts a large number of bees, blowflies, small flightless animals, and Bombyliidae to the flowers. The nectar is visible as a colourless liquid which has a glistening appearance to the outer faces of the glands. Nectar runs down from the glands and accumulates on the floor of the flower as a result of continuing secretion. The fruit are little pear-shaped capsules which contain numerous achenes attached to fine feathery strands which aid their dispersal by the wind. Often, only a few seeds are viable.

As Laurelia novae-zelandiae age, the trees often develop large hollows at the centre of their trunks.

== Uses ==
The plant is used in rongoā (traditional Māori medicine) as an analgesic, due to the presence of the alkaloid pukateine in the bark of the tree. The hollows at the centre of trunks were also traditionally used as burial trees.

The timber was used by Māori to create figureheads for canoes, as well as for bowls, clubs and paddles. The wood was also adopted by early European settlers for boat building. It is rather soft, but very strong. It yields a pale hardwood that is difficult to split and will dent upon impact rather than break. Its wood is pale-yellowish, with growth rings, and is homogeneous and fine-textured. The pulp of the cambium was boiled in water and the resulting liquid used for treating tuberculosis.

== Alkaloids ==
Laureline [81-38-9]

Other aporphine alkaloids that are contained within Laurelia novae-zelandiae are (-)-methylpukateine, Laurepukine [34029-94-2] & Laureline [34029-94-2].

History:

== Gallery ==
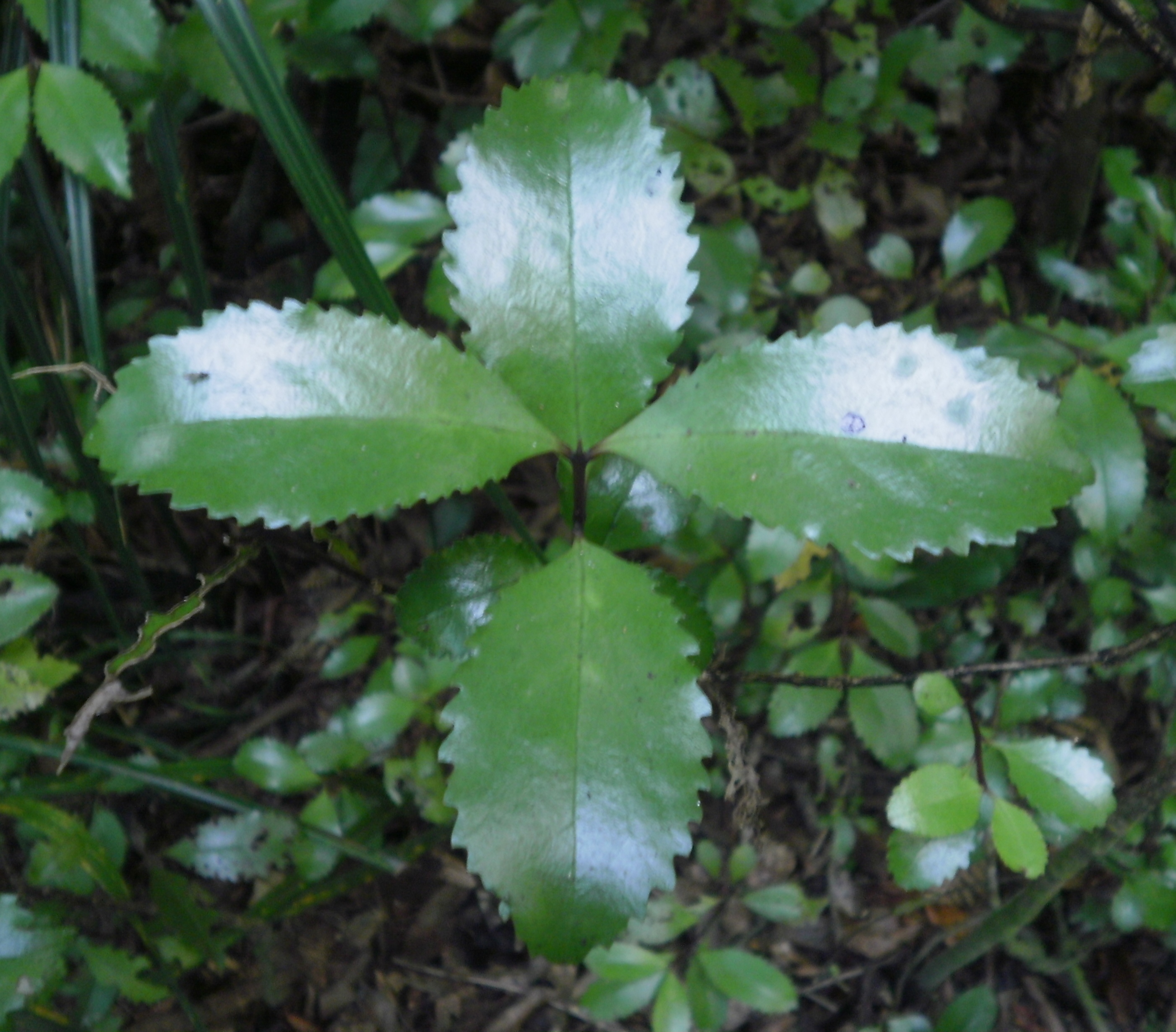
Leaves of a pukatea seedling

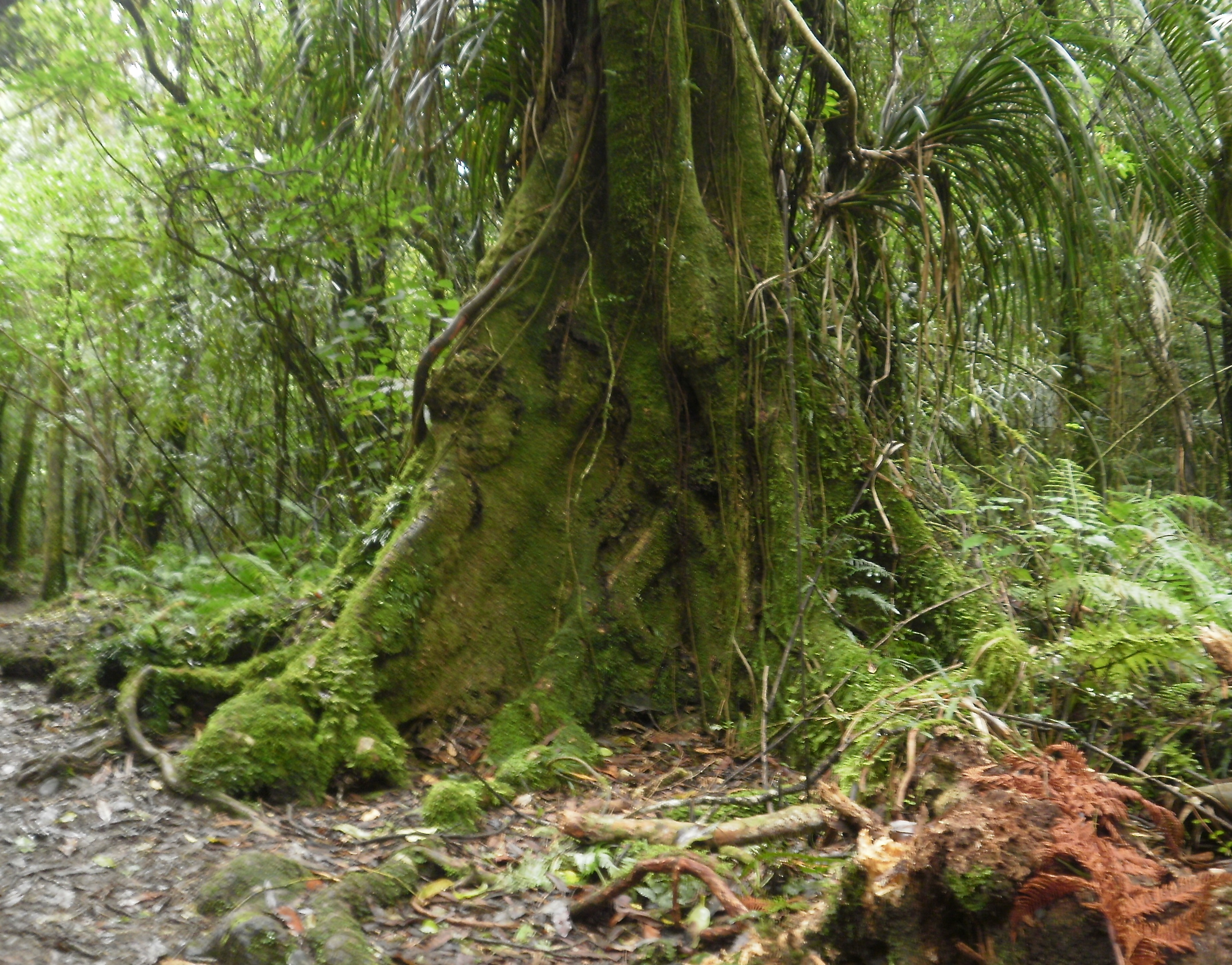
The buttressed trunk of a pukatea

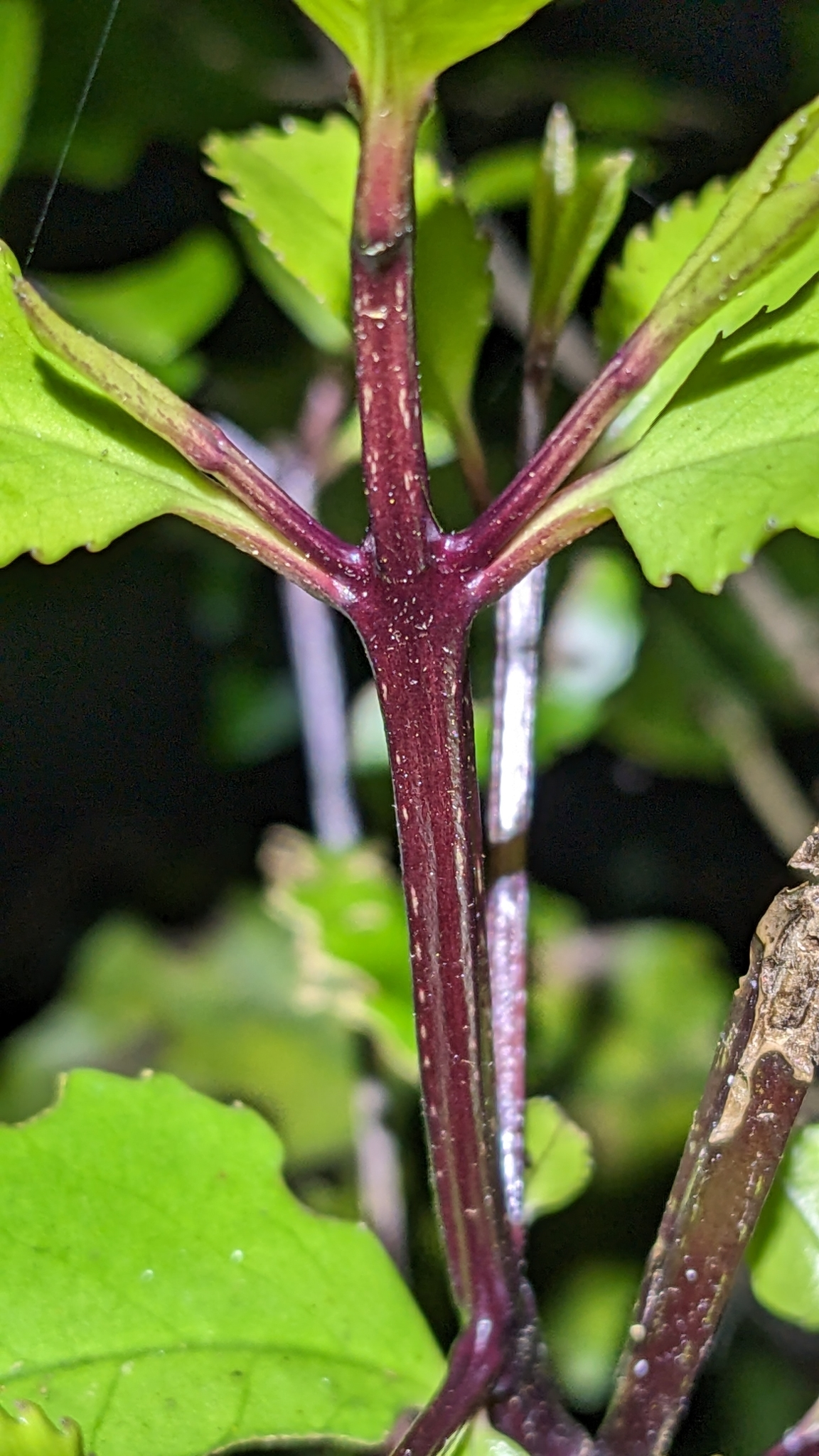
Stems of pukatea

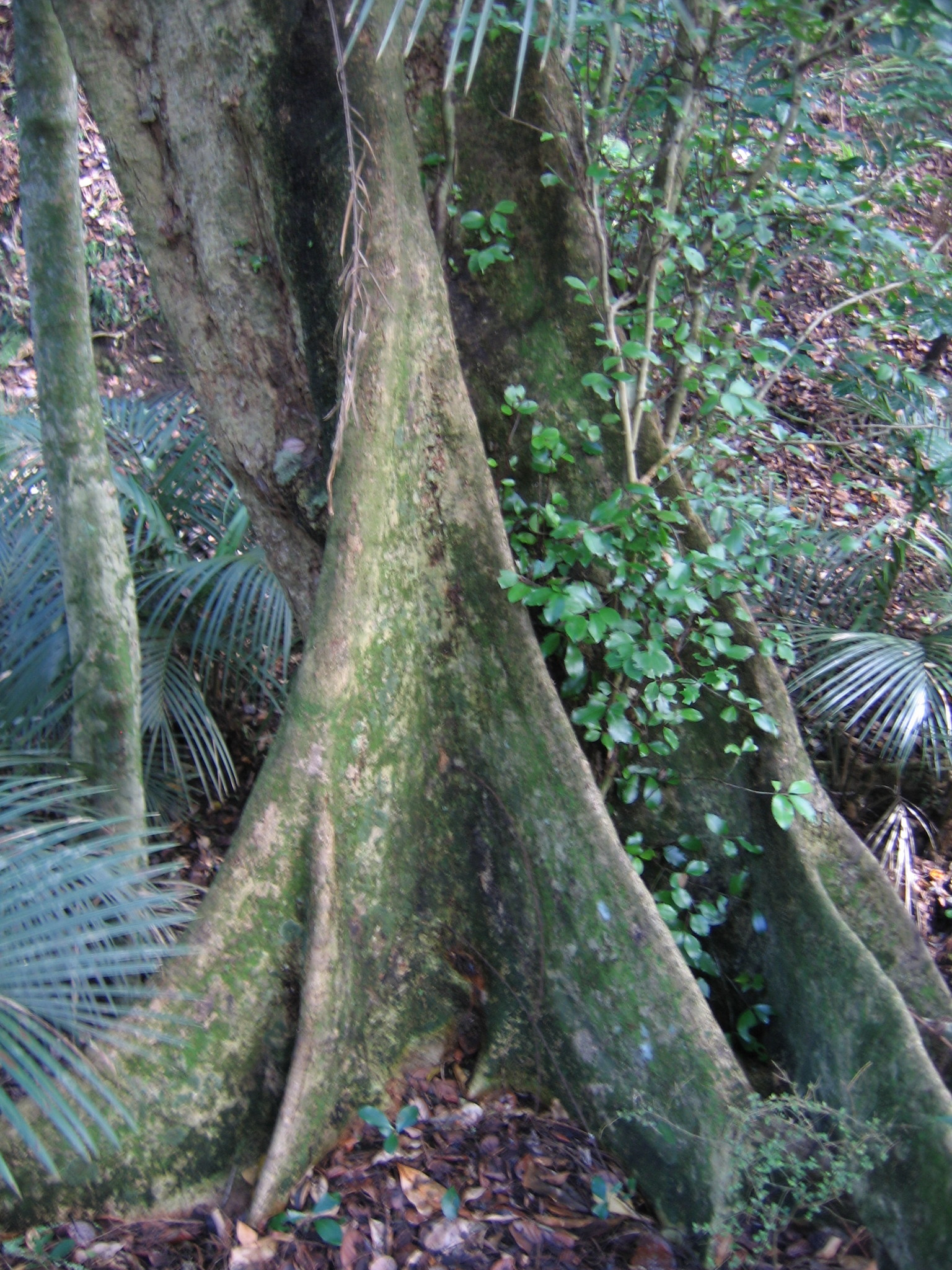
Pukatea trunk

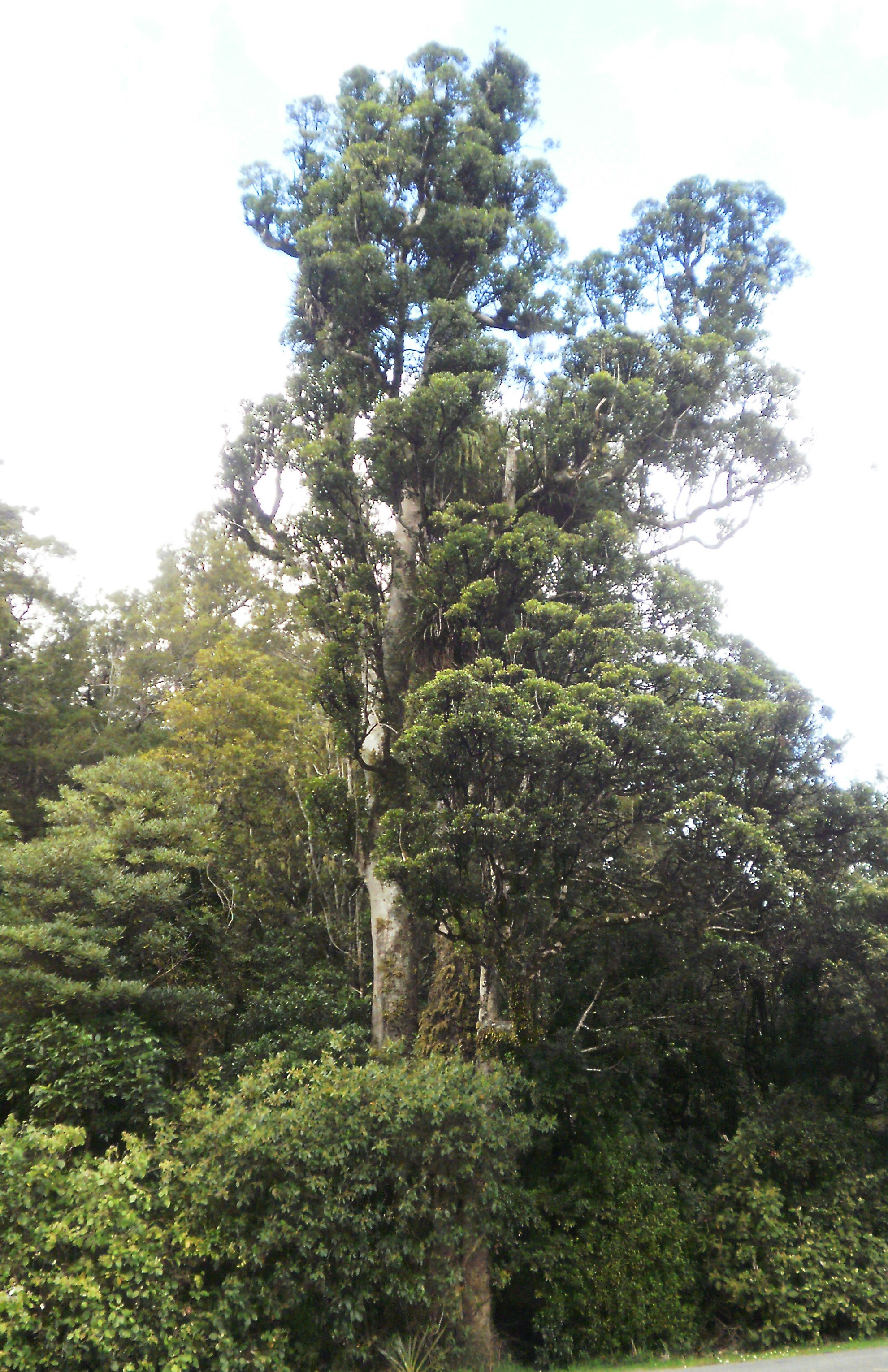
Pukatea in a forested area
