= Nemuaron =

Conservation status
- Least Concern (IUCN 3.1)

Scientific classification
- Kingdom: Plantae
- Clade: Tracheophytes
- Clade: Angiosperms
- Clade: Magnoliids
- Order: Laurales
- Family: Atherospermataceae
- Genus: Nemuaron; Baill.
- Species: N. vieillardii

Binomial name
- Nemuaron vieillardii (Baill.) Baill.

Synonyms
- Doryphora austrocaledonica Seem.; Doryphora vieillardii Baill. (1870); Nemuaron humboldtii Baill.

Genus of trees

Nemuaron vieillardii is a species of trees in the Atherospermataceae family. It is endemic to New Caledonia and the only species of the genus Nemuaron. Its closest relative is the monotypic genus Atherosperma from Australia.
