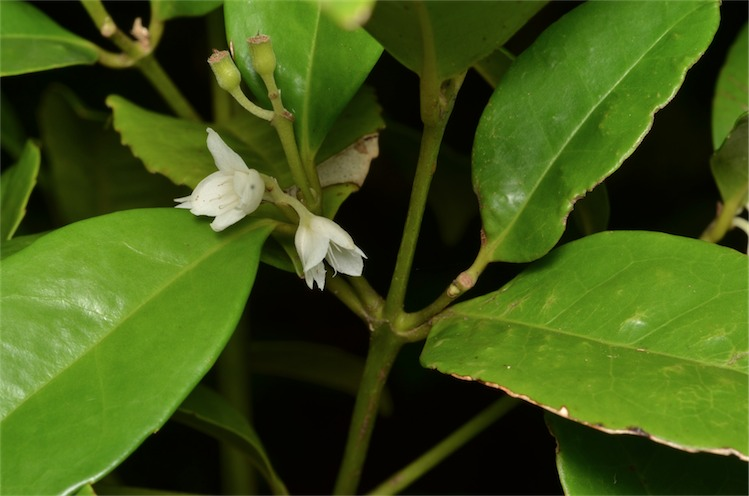

Conservation status
- Least Concern (IUCN 3.1)

Scientific classification
- Kingdom: Plantae
- Clade: Tracheophytes
- Clade: Angiosperms
- Clade: Magnoliids
- Order: Laurales
- Family: Atherospermataceae
- Genus: Doryphora
- Species: D. aromatica

Binomial name
- Doryphora aromatica (F.M.Bailey) L.S.Sm.

Synonyms
- Daphnandra aromatica F.M.Bailey

= Doryphora aromatica =

Species of tree

Doryphora aromatica, commonly known as sassafras, northern sassafras, northern grey sassafras, net sassafras or grey sassafras, is a species of flowering plant in the Southern Sassafras Family Atherospermataceae and is endemic to north-east Queensland. It is a tree with elliptic or egg-shaped leaves with the narrower end towards the base, white flowers with 5 stamens and 6 to 8 carpels, and achenes splitting to release feather-like fruits.

== Description ==
Doryphora aromatica is a tree that typically grows to 12–40 m (39–131 ft) high. Its leaves are elliptic to egg-shaped with the narrower end towards the base, 50–135 mm (2.0–5.3 in) long and 20–43 mm (0.79–1.69 in) wide on a petiole 5–8 mm (0.20–0.31 in) long, and emit an aromatic odour when crushed. The edges of the leaves are sometimes shallowly toothed, and both surfaces have a prominent midvein. The flowers are white with 4 tepals 5–7 mm (0.20–0.28 in) long and 2.5–3.5 mm (0.098–0.138 in) wide, the androecium with 3 whorls of 5 stamens and 6 to 11 staminodes, and there are 6 to 8 carpels. Flowering occurs from February to June and the achenes are 3.0–4.5 mm (0.12–0.18 in) long and 2–3 mm (0.079–0.118 in) in diameter, and split to release fruit with feather-like hairs.

== Taxonomy ==
This species was first formally described in 1886 by Frederick Manson Bailey who gave it the name Daphnandra aromatica in A Synopsis of the Queensland Flora from a specimen collected near the Johnstone River br Thomas Lane Bancroft. In 1958, Lindsay Stuart Smith transferred the species to Doryphora as D. aromatica.

== Distribution and habitat ==
Doryphora aromatica is widespread in north-east Queensland where it grows in rainforest along creeks and gullies.

== Ecology ==
The leaves of this species are food for the larval stages of Macleay's swallowtail (Graphium macleayanus) and blue triangle butterfly (Graphium sarpedon).
