= Dryadodaphne =

- Dryadodaphne crassa specimen at National Museum of Natural History, Washington

Scientific classification
- Kingdom: Plantae
- Clade: Tracheophytes
- Clade: Angiosperms
- Clade: Magnoliids
- Order: Laurales
- Family: Atherospermataceae
- Genus: Dryadodaphne; S.Moore

Synonyms
- Heterotypic Synonyms: Isomerocarpa A.C.Sm.

Genus of plants

Dryadodaphne is a genus of flowering plants belonging to the family Atherospermataceae. Its native range is New Guinea to Northern Queensland.

== Species ==
Accepted species include:

- Dryadodaphne crassa Schodde ex Philipson
- Dryadodaphne novoguineensis (G.Perkins) A.C.Sm.
- Dryadodaphne trachyphloia Schodde
