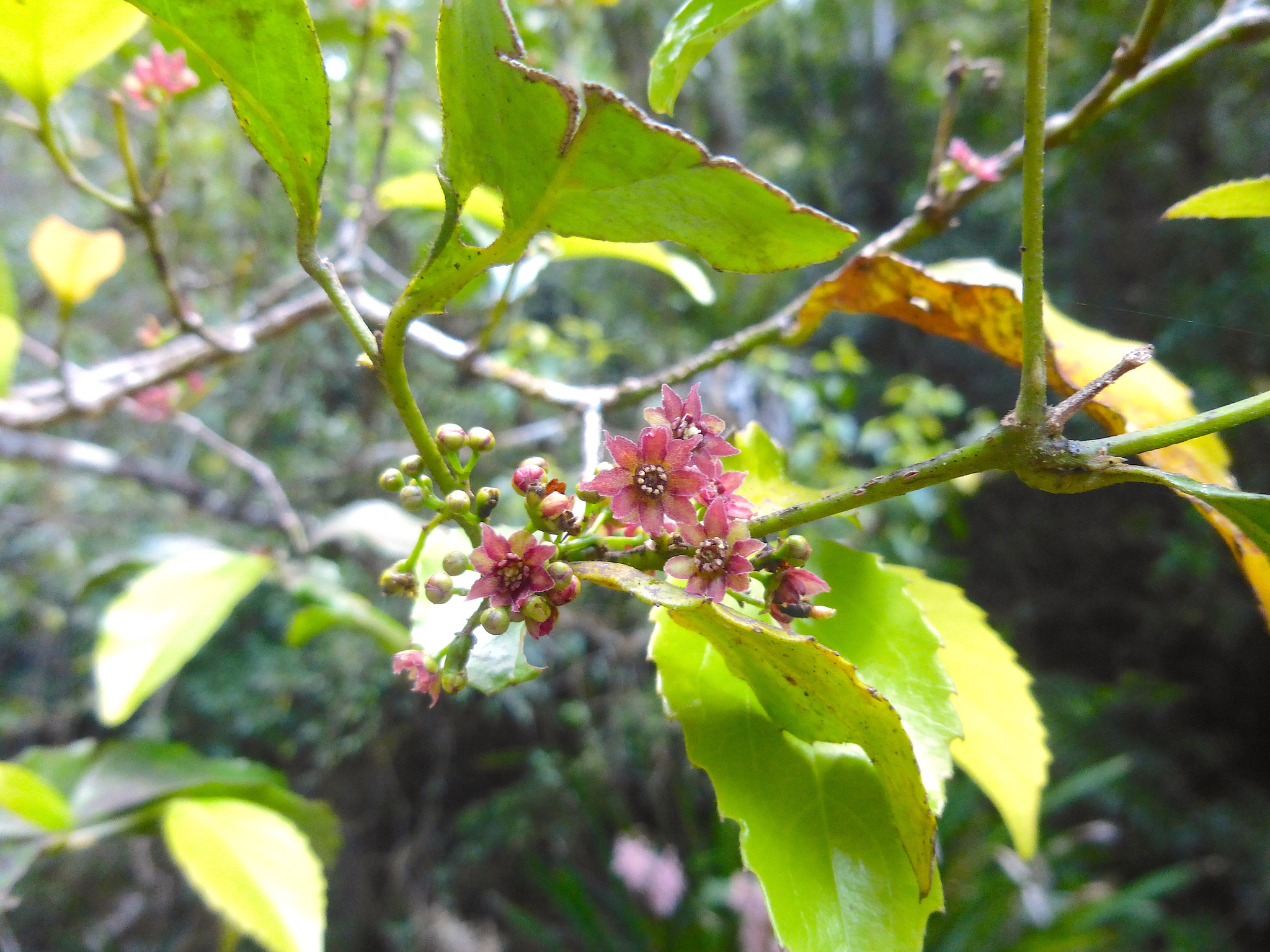

Conservation status
- Least Concern (IUCN 3.1)

Scientific classification
- Kingdom: Plantae
- Clade: Tracheophytes
- Clade: Angiosperms
- Clade: Magnoliids
- Order: Laurales
- Family: Atherospermataceae
- Genus: Daphnandra
- Species: D. tenuipes

Binomial name
- Daphnandra tenuipes Perkins

= Daphnandra tenuipes =

Socket sassafras

Species of tree

Daphnandra tenuipes, commonly known as the socket sassafrass, or red-flowered socketwood, is a rainforest tree in eastern Australia. It grows on the more fertile basaltic and alluvial soils. It is found from near Boorganna Nature Reserve near Taree, New South Wales to just over the border into Queensland at Springbrook National Park. It is a small to medium-sized tree featuring red new shoots and red flowers. It has dark green leaves, which are lanceolate or ovate, and measure 4–13 cm (1.5–5 in) in length and 1.5–3 cm (0.59–1.18 in) wide.

Daphnandra tenuipes was first described by J.R. Perkins in 1901, and still bears its original name.
