= Australian National Wildlife Collection =

A collection of almost 200,000 zoological specimens

Australian National Wildlife Collection (ANWC)
- Housed at: National Research Collections Australia; Crace, Australian Capital Territory
- Size (no. of items): <200,000 zoological specimens
- Website: Official website

The Australian National Wildlife Collection (ANWC) is a collection of almost 200,000 zoological specimens, including skeletons, skins, spirit specimens, birds' eggs, frozen tissue samples and a wildlife sound library, mainly of vertebrate animals from Australia and Papua New Guinea, which are stored in a secure, climate-controlled facility. It is based at CSIRO Sustainable Ecosystems Division in the Australian Capital Territory.

== History ==
The ANWC was established in 1966, though its origins date from the late 1950s when scientists in the CSIRO's Wildlife Survey section were collecting specimens in the course of their work and were concerned that their individual collections should not be dispersed and should be accessible at a central location for long-term security and so that comparative studies could be made. The decision to establish a central facility was made by Harold Frith, Chief of the Division of Wildlife. The founding Curator, later Director, was Richard Schodde, who held the post for nearly thirty years. It was formally recognised and named the Australian National Wildlife Collection in 1976 through gazettal by the Government of Australia.

== Collection ==
The collection holds almost 200,000 specimens including 55,000 birds (representing approximately 99% of Australian species), 37,500 land mammals (75% of Australian species), 10,000 reptiles (60% of Australian species), and 3000 frogs and toadlets (70% of Australian species). These specimens include study skins, bones and teeth, and liquid-preserved specimens. The collection also includes 31,000 egg clutches from 1000 species and 37,000 cryopreservation samples from over 23,000 individual specimens, as well as a sound archive comprising 60,000 recordings of amphibians, birds, invertebrates, and mammals.
