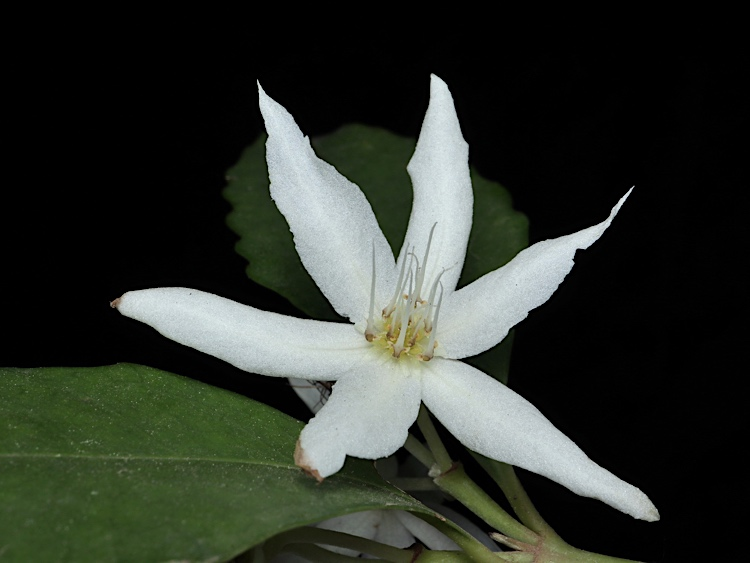

Conservation status
- Least Concern (IUCN 3.1)

Scientific classification
- Kingdom: Plantae
- Clade: Tracheophytes
- Clade: Angiosperms
- Clade: Magnoliids
- Order: Laurales
- Family: Atherospermataceae
- Genus: Doryphora
- Species: D. sassafras

Binomial name
- Doryphora sassafras Endl.

Synonyms
- Atherosperma sassafras A.Cunn. ex A.DC.

= Doryphora sassafras =

Species of tree

Doryphora sassafras, commonly known as sassafras, yellow sassafras, golden deal or golden sassafras, is a species of flowering plant in the southern sassafras family Atherospermataceae and is endemic to eastern Australia. It is a shrub to tree with elliptic or egg-shaped leaves and contrasting white flowers which occur in autumn and winter.

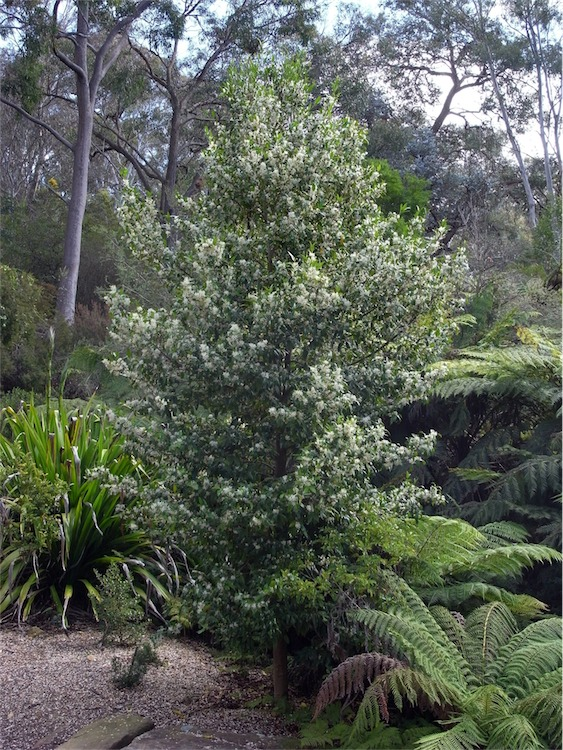
Habit in the Australian National Botanic Gardens

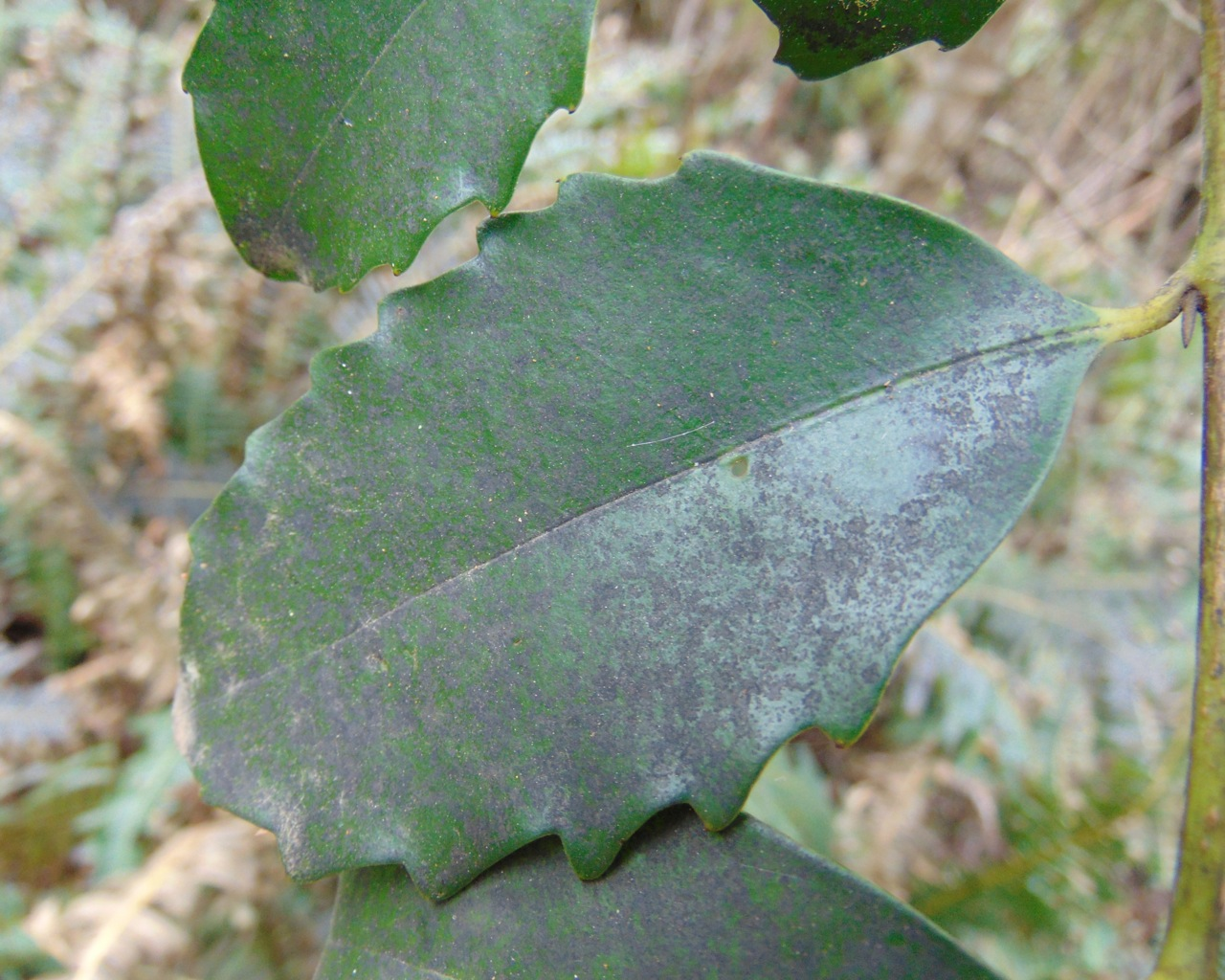
Leaf

== Description ==
Doryphora sassafras is a shrub or tree that typically grows to 2.5–36 m (10–120 ft). Its leaves are arranged in opposite pairs, elliptic to lanceolate or ovate, 30–110 mm (1.2–4.3 in) long and 15–40 mm (0.6–1.6 in) wide on a petiole 3–6 mm (0.1–0.2 in) long. The edges of the leaves are shallowly to deeply toothed, glabrous and glossy, and both surfaces have a prominent midvein. All parts of the tree have a spicy smell, but should be treated with "some caution", since the plant contains the poisonous alkaloid doryphorine. Each individual leaf on a sassafras has a lifespan up to 12 years, and exceptionally to 19 years.

The flowers are white with 6 tepals in 2 whorls mostly 7–13 mm (0.3–0.5 in) long and 2.5–4 mm (0.1–0.2 in) wide, the androecium with usually 4 whorls with 6 stamens and 14 to 18 staminodes, and there are 8 to 12 carpels. Flowering occurs from May to October and the achenes are 3.5–5 mm (0.1–0.2 in) long and 2–3 mm (0.08–0.12 in) in diameter.

== Taxonomy ==
Doryphora sassafras was first described in 1837 by Austrian naturalist Stephan Endlicher in 1837 in his Iconographia generum plantarum. Its generic name is derived from the Ancient Greek dory- "spear" and pherein "to carry", and refers to the anthers in the flower, while its specific epithet is taken from its similar odour to the North American Laurel (Sassafras albidum). It is a member of the small Southern Sasafrass family (Atherospermataceae) along with several other Australian and Patagonian rainforest trees including southern sassafras (Atherosperma moschatum).

== Distribution and habitat ==
The distribution is from Nambour in southern Queensland through eastern New South Wales to Wolumla Peak in Yurammie State Forest. It is found in temperate rainforest on basalt soils at higher elevations and sedimentary soils at lower elevations, commonly associated with coachwood (Ceratopetalum apetalum) and native crabapple (Schizomeria ovata).

== Ecology ==
Male mosquitoes and crane flies are attracted to the flowers of sassafras, but although they are nectarivores, in their struggle to feed, they pollinate the flowers.

== Uses ==
=== Timber ===
The soft yellowish timber is used in floors, turnery, and cabinet work.

=== Use in horticulture ===
It is used in reforestation but generally grows too big to be used in home gardens. It has been thought to have potential as a potted specimen. It has been planted in Dublin area in Ireland
