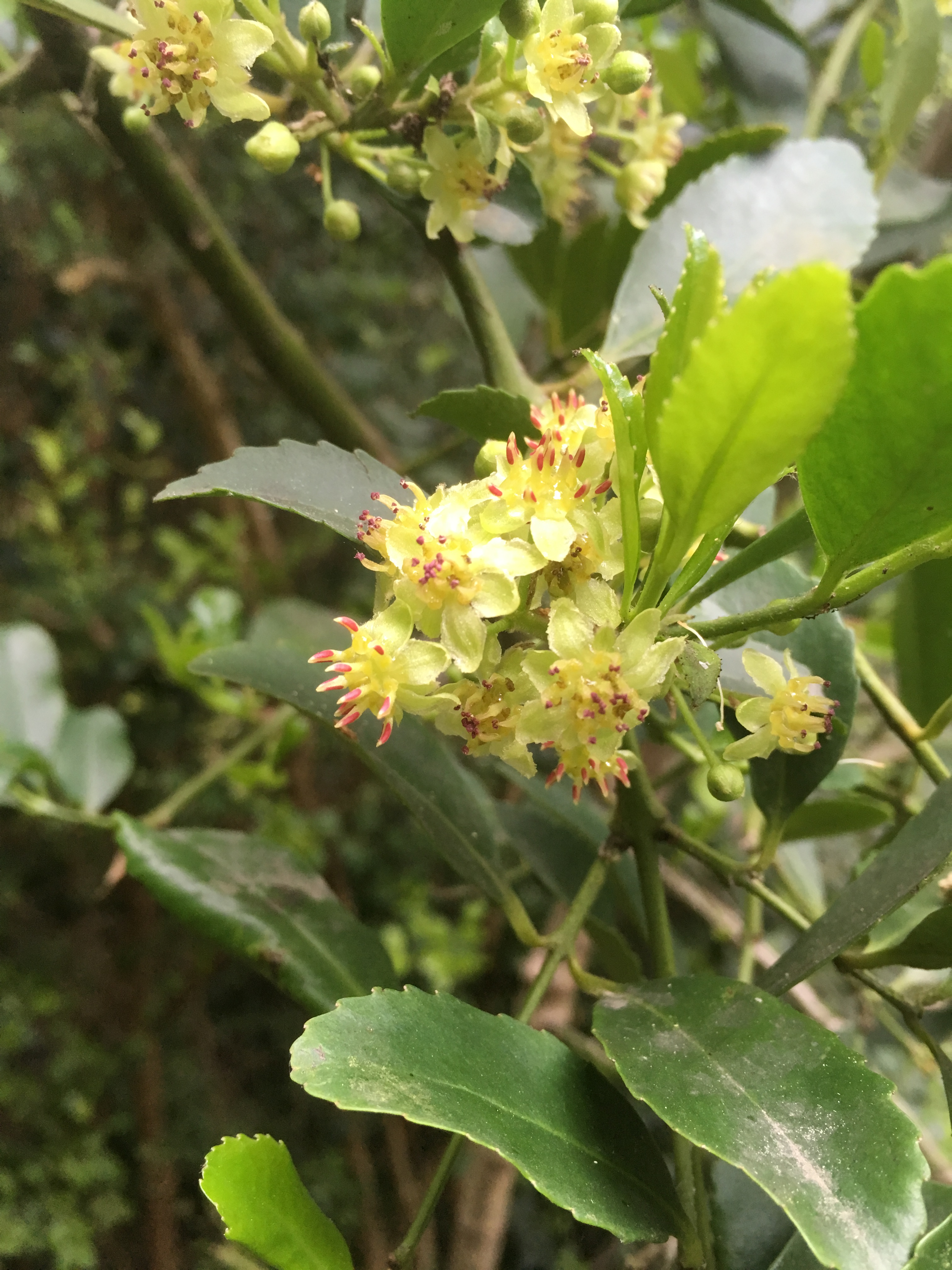
- Laurelia sempervirens

Scientific classification
- Kingdom: Plantae
- Clade: Tracheophytes
- Clade: Angiosperms
- Clade: Magnoliids
- Order: Laurales
- Family: Atherospermataceae
- Genus: Laurelia; Juss.

Synonyms
- Pavonia Ruiz, nom. illeg. homonym. post.; Thiga Molina

= Laurelia =

Genus of flowering plants

Laurelia is a genus of plants in the major group Angiosperms (flowering plants) in the family Atherospermataceae, or formerly Monimiaceae. It contains only two species, both endemic to the southern hemisphere, an example of Gondwanan distribution.

- Laurelia novae-zelandiae A.Cunn. – native to New Zealand
- †Laurelia otagoensis – native to New Zealand in Miocene
- Laurelia sempervirens (Ruiz & Pav.) Tul. – native to Chile
