= Richard Schodde =

Australian botanist and ornithologist

Richard Schodde, OAM (born 23 September 1936) is an Australian botanist and ornithologist.

Schodde studied at the University of Adelaide, where he received a BSc (Hons) in 1960 and a PhD in 1970. During the 1960s he was a botanist with the CSIRO Division of Land Research and Regional Survey in Papua New Guinea. From 1970 to 1998 he was the foundation curator and director of the Australian National Wildlife Collection (ANWC) in the CSIRO Division of Wildlife and Ecology, following which he became a research fellow there. During this time he led the flora and fauna surveys that helped establish Kakadu National Park and the designation of the wet tropics of north-eastern Queensland as Australia's first World Heritage Site. These surveys resulted in the accession of almost 50,000 specimens to the ANWC, as well as 15,000 samples of frozen tissue for molecular studies. In the 2009 Queen's birthday honours, Schodde was awarded an OAM for his contribution to the natural sciences, particularly ornithology.

Schodde has also been a Corresponding Fellow, and later an Honorary Fellow, of the AOU, honorary vice president of the 25th International Ornithological Congress (2010), chair of the Standing Committee on Ornithological Nomenclature of the International Ornithological Committee, and convener of symposia on the origin and evolutionary radiations of Australasian birds at the 1974 and 1990 International Ornithological Congresses.

== Publications ==
As well as numerous scientific papers, books authored, coauthored or edited by Schodde include:

- 1975 – Interim list of Australian songbirds: Passerines. RAOU: Melbourne.
- 1980 – Nocturnal Birds of Australia. (With Ian J. Mason. Illustrations by Jeremy Boot). Lansdowne Editions: Melbourne. (Whitley Medal 1981).
- 1982 – The Fairy-Wrens. a Monograph of the Maluridae. (With illustrations by Richard Weatherly). Lansdowne Editions: Melbourne. ISBN 0-7018-1051-3. (Whitley Medal 1982).
- 1983 – A Review of Norfolk Island Birds: Past and Present. (With P. Fullagar and N. Hermes). ANPWS Special Publication No.8.
- 1988 – Reader's Digest Complete Book of Australian Birds. (Coeditor of 2nd edition with Sonia Tidemann). Reader's Digest: Sydney. ISBN 0-949819-99-9
- 1997 – Zoological Catalogue of Australia: Aves (Columbidae to Coraciidae) v. 37. 2. (With Ian J. Mason). CSIRO Publishing. ISBN 0-643-06037-5
- 1998 – CSIRO List of Australian Vertebrates: A Reference with Conservation Status. (With M. Stanger, M Clayton, I. Mason and J. Wombey). CSIRO Publishing. ISBN 0-643-06256-4
- 1999 – The Directory of Australian Birds: Passerines. A taxonomic and zoogeographic atlas of the biodiversity of birds of Australia and its territories. (With Ian J. Mason). CSIRO Publishing. ISBN 0-643-06456-7
- 2006 – Proceedings of the 23rd International Ornithological Congress, Beijing, August 2002. (General editor). Acta Zoologica Sinica, Vol.52, Supplement. Science Press: Beijing.
- 2006 – The Encyclopedia of Birds. A Complete Visual Guide. (With Fred Cooke). Fog City Press. ISBN 1-74089-355-7
