= Curricabark River =

River in New South Wales, Australia

Coordinates: 31°45′S 151°36′E

Curricabark River Curricabark Creek

Location
- Country: Australia
- State: New South Wales
- IBRA: New England Tablelands
- District: Northern Tablelands
- Local government area: Mid-Coast Council

Physical characteristics
- Source: Great Dividing Range
  - location: Northwest of Cootera Hill, southeast of Nundle
  - elevation: 664 m (2,178 ft)
- Mouth: confluence with the Barnard River
  - location: northwest of Giro, north of Gloucester
  - elevation: 170 m (560 ft)
- Length: 40 km (25 mi)

Basin features
- River system: Manning River catchment
- National park: Woko National Park

Curricabark River, a perennial river of the Manning River catchment, is located in the Northern Tablelands region of New South Wales, Australia.

== Course and features ==
Curricabark River rises on the eastern slopes of the Great Dividing Range, northwest of Cootera Hill, southeast of Nundle and flows generally southeast, before reaching its confluence with the Barnard River, northwest of Giro, north of Gloucester. The river descends 494 metres (1,621 ft) over its 40-kilometre (25 mi) course.

== See also ==
- Rivers of New South Wales
- List of rivers of New South Wales (A–K)
- List of rivers of Australia
