= Barnard River =

River in New South Wales, Australia

Coordinates: 31°39′S 151°44′E

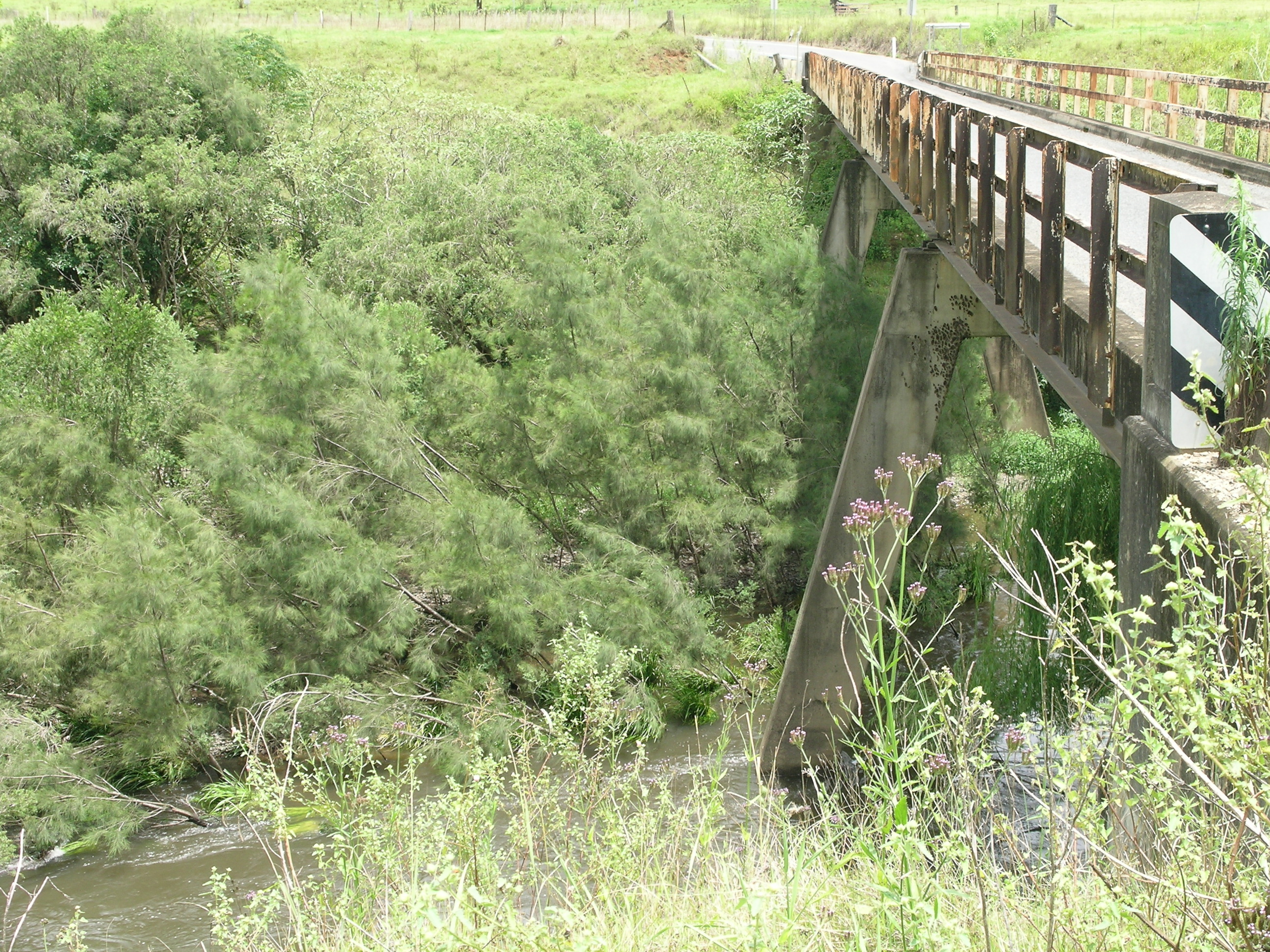
- Thunderbolts Way crosses Barnard River
- Etymology: In honour of Andrew Barnard

Location
- Country: Australia
- State: New South Wales
- IBRA: New England Tablelands, Mid North Coast
- District: Northern Tablelands
- Local government area: Mid-Coast Council

Physical characteristics
- Source: Great Dividing Range
  - location: near Hanging Rock, east of Nundle
  - elevation: 1,330 m (4,360 ft)
- Mouth: confluence with the Manning River
  - location: near Bretti
  - elevation: 94 m (308 ft)
- Length: 148 km (92 mi)

Basin features
- River system: Manning River catchment
- Tributaries
  - left: Back River (Tamworth), Myall Creek
  - right: Ben Halls Creek, Tomalla Creek, Schofields Creek, Orham Creek, Curricabark River
- National park: Woko National Park

Barnard River, a perennial river of the Manning River catchment, is located in the Northern Tablelands and Mid North Coast districts of New South Wales, Australia.

== Course and features ==
Barnard River rises on the eastern slopes of the Great Dividing Range, near Hanging Rock, east of Nundle, and flows generally east southeast, joined by seven tributaries including the Bank and Curricabark rivers, before reaching its confluence with the Manning River, near Bretti. The river descends 1,240 metres (4,070 ft) over its 148 kilometres (92 mi) course.

The river was first explored in 1825 by European explorer Henry Dangar, and named by Thomas Mitchell in honour of Lt. Col. Andrew Barnard.

=== River diversion ===
The Barnard River Scheme, an inter-basin water transfer system, enables the transfer of up to 20,000 megalitres (710×10^{6} cu ft) of water per annum from the Barnard River and the upper catchment of the Manning River into the Hunter River. The diversion involves the transfer of water from Orham Dam, impounded at Barnard Weir, and pumped over the Mount Royal Range and gravity fed into the Glenbawn Dam. The diverted water then feeds into the Hunter River above its confluence with the Goulburn River. Water is accessed from the Barnard River to meet any shortfall from the Hunter River system in order to feed Plashett Dam and Lake Liddell, that are needed for the cooling of the Bayswater and Liddell electric power stations. The scheme operates under a water licence issued by the NSW Government to Macquarie Generation.

== See also ==
- Rivers of New South Wales
- List of rivers of New South Wales (A–K)
- List of rivers of Australia
