= Back River (Tamworth) =

River in Australia

Back River Barnard Gully, Back Creek

Location
- Country: Australia
- State: New South Wales
- IBRA: New England Tablelands
- District: Northern Tablelands
- Local government area: Tamworth Regional

Physical characteristics
- Source: Great Dividing Range
  - location: near Hanging Rock, east of Nundle
  - coordinates: 31.48917°S 151.22637°E
  - elevation: 1,200 m (3,900 ft)
- Mouth: confluence with the Barnard River
  - coordinates: 31.55603°S 151.34338°E
  - elevation: 548 m (1,798 ft)
- Length: 21 km (13 mi)

Basin features
- River system: Manning River catchment

Back River, a perennial stream of the Manning River catchment, is located in the Northern Tablelands region of New South Wales, Australia.

== Course and features ==
Back River on the eastern slopes of the Great Dividing Range, near Hanging Rock, east of Nundle, and flows generally east and then southeast before reaching its confluence with the Barnard River. The river descends 649 metres (2,129 ft) over its 21 kilometres (13 mi) course.

== See also ==
- Rivers of New South Wales
- List of rivers of New South Wales (A–K)
- List of rivers of Australia
