= Parry County =

Parry New South Wales
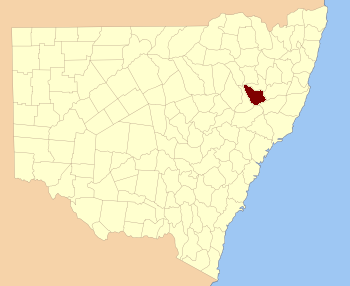
- Location in New South Wales
Lands administrative divisions around Parry:
Nandewar	Inglis	Vernon
Buckland	Parry	Vernon
Buckland	Brisbane	Hawes

Parry County is one of the 141 cadastral divisions of New South Wales. It is bounded by the Peel River and Cockburn River on the north, near Tamworth. The Moonbi Range is on the eastern boundary, and the Peel Range on the western boundary. The Great Dividing Range is the boundary to the south-east. It includes the towns of Dungowan, Ogunbil, Woolomin, Loomberah, Piallamore and Nundle.

Parry County was named in honour of Sir William Edward Parry, Commissioner for the Australian Agricultural Company, who selected the area within the county which was granted to what was then called the Peel River Company.

== Parishes within this county ==
A full list of parishes found within this county; their current LGA and mapping coordinates to the approximate centre of each location is as follows:

Parish	LGA	Coordinates
Ainsley	Tamworth Regional Council	31°10′54″S 151°20′04″E
Anna	Tamworth Regional Council	31°06′54″S 151°15′04″E
Bective	Tamworth Regional Council	30°59′54″S 150°45′04″E
Bullimball	Tamworth Regional Council	31°05′54″S 151°12′04″E
Calala	Tamworth Regional Council	31°08′54″S 150°56′04″E
Callaghan	Tamworth Regional Council	31°20′54″S 151°24′04″E
Crawney	Tamworth Regional Council	31°32′54″S 151°00′04″E
Dungowan	Tamworth Regional Council	31°25′54″S 151°10′04″E
Garoo	Tamworth Regional Council	31°21′54″S 150°58′04″E
Gill	Tamworth Regional Council	31°07′50″S 151°05′35″E
Goonoo Goonoo	Tamworth Regional Council	31°19′54″S 150°50′04″E
Loftus	Tamworth Regional Council	31°14′54″S 151°20′04″E
Loomberah	Tamworth Regional Council	31°14′54″S 150°59′04″E
Moolunmoola	Tamworth Regional Council	31°03′54″S 150°40′04″E
Moorowara	Gunnedah Shire Council	30°56′54″S 150°31′04″E
Mulla	Tamworth Regional Council	31°07′24″S 151°08′04″E
Murroon	Tamworth Regional Council	31°05′54″S 150°52′04″E
Nemingha	Tamworth Regional Council	31°06′54″S 150°51′04″E
Nundle	Tamworth Regional Council	31°29′54″S 151°08′04″E
Ogunbil	Tamworth Regional Council	31°18′24″S 151°16′54″E
Piallamore	Tamworth Regional Council	31°11′48″S 151°10′28″E
Royinn	Tamworth Regional Council	31°21′54″S 151°15′04″E
Scott	Tamworth Regional Council	31°24′54″S 151°21′04″E
Somerton	Tamworth Regional Council	31°01′08″S 150°37′31″E
Tamarang	Tamworth Regional Council	31°20′54″S 150°53′04″E
Tangaratta	Tamworth Regional Council	30°58′54″S 150°49′04″E
Timbumburi	Tamworth Regional Council	31°15′54″S 150°56′04″E
Turi	Tamworth Regional Council	31°16′54″S 150°51′04″E
Vernon	Walcha Council	31°07′54″S 151°20′04″E
Walcha	Tamworth Regional Council	31°15′54″S 151°21′04″E
Warral	Tamworth Regional Council	31°09′54″S 150°46′04″E
Winton	Tamworth Regional Council	31°06′54″S 150°43′04″E
Wombramurra	Tamworth Regional Council	31°34′43″S 151°06′03″E
Woolomin	Tamworth Regional Council	31°16′50″S 151°10′47″E
Yeerowin	Tamworth Regional Council	31°25′54″S 151°18′04″E

== See also ==
- List of reduplicated Australian place names
