= Nundle Shire =

Former local government area in New South Wales, Australia

Nundle Shire New South Wales
- Established: 7 March 1906
- Abolished: 17 March 2004
- Council seat: Nundle
- Region: New England

Nundle Shire was a local government area in the New England region of New South Wales, Australia.

Nundle Shire was proclaimed on 7 March 1906, one of 134 shires created after the passing of the Local Government (Shires) Act 1905.

The shire office was in Nundle. Other towns in the shire included Woolomin.

Nundle Shire amalgamated with the City of Tamworth, Manilla Shire and parts of Parry Shire and Barraba Shire to form Tamworth Regional Council on 17 March 2004.
