= Bective, New South Wales =

Locality in New South Wales, Australia

Coordinates: 30°59′S 150°44′E

Bective is a locality in New South Wales, located on the Oxley Highway about 18 kilometres WNW of Tamworth.

The name originally appears at the name of a large pastoral property near the Peel River in the 1860s. The name is derived from a town near Dublin, or an abbey located there, or from Lord Bective, a notable British cabinet minister of the era whose title name derives from that place.
