= Woolomin, New South Wales =

Woolomin
- Town
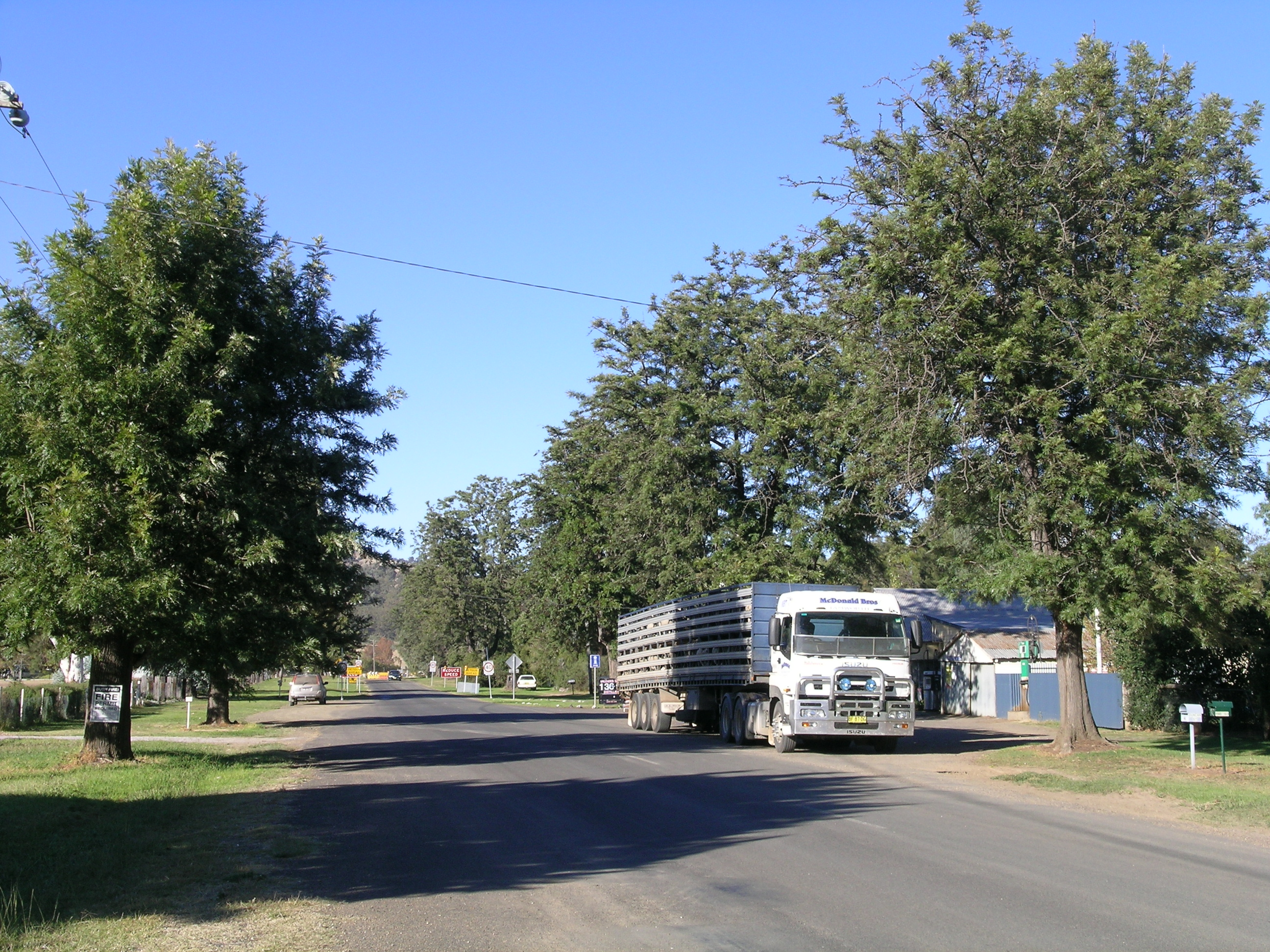
- The main street

- Coordinates: 31°18′S 151°09′E
- Country: Australia
- State: New South Wales
- LGA: Tamworth Regional Council
- Location: 20 km (12 mi) N of Nundle

Government
  - State electorate: Tamworth
  - Federal division: New England

Population
  - Total: 469 (2006 census)
- Postcode: 2340

Woolomin is a small settlement on the bank of the Peel River, about 20 km north of Nundle, New South Wales, Australia and about 40 km south east of the city of Tamworth. It is on the Fossickers Way near Chaffey Dam. At the 2006 census, Woolomin had a population of 469.

On 20 November 2000 approximately 50 homes were evacuated as the Peel River burst its banks.

The village has a public school and agriculture is the major industry for the region.
