= Chaffey Dam =

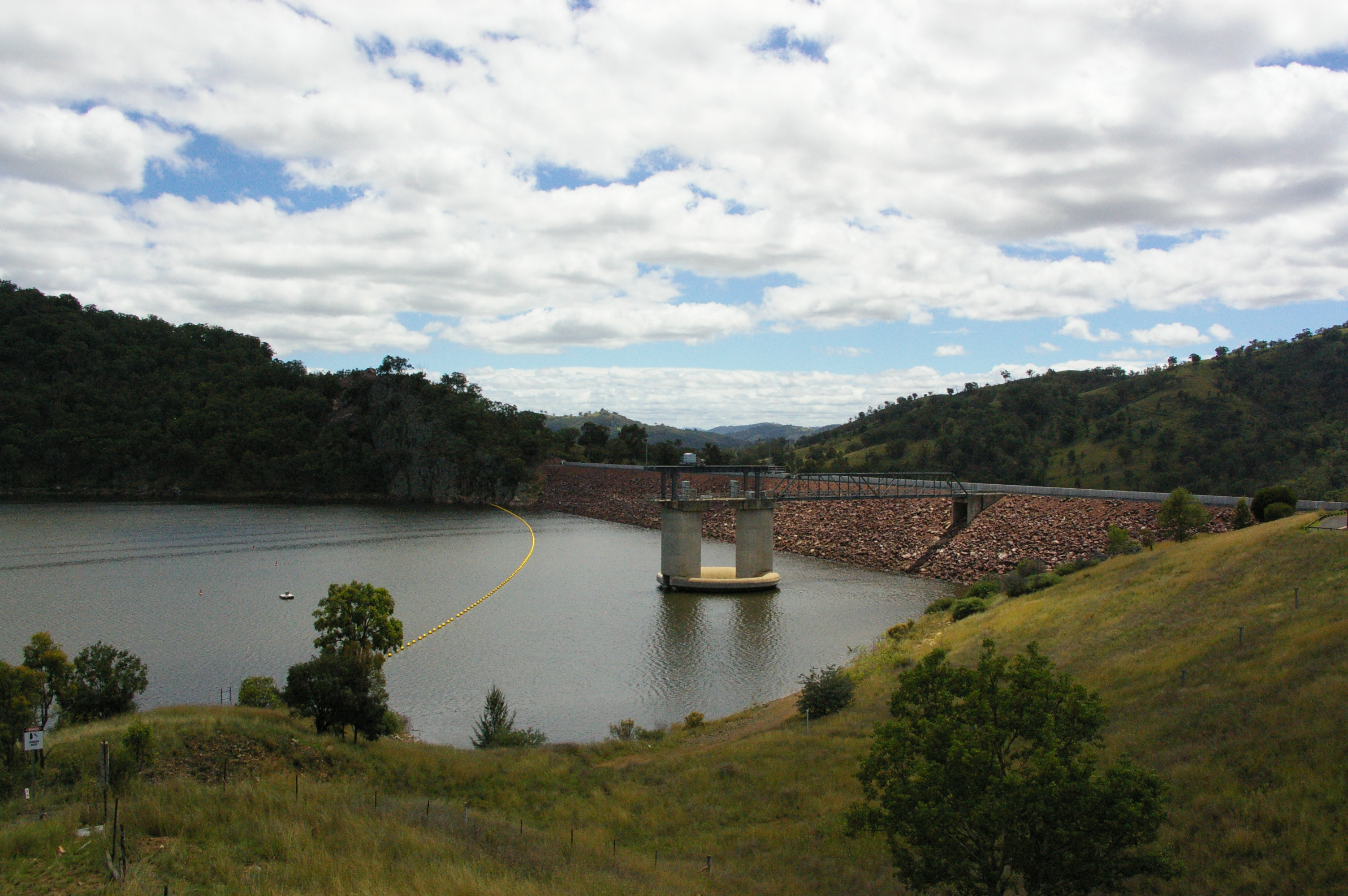
- Chaffey Dam (pre upgrade) at 77% capacity, in 2008.

- Location of Chaffey Dam in New South Wales
- Location: Tamworth, New South Wales, Australia
- Coordinates: 31°20′45″S 151°08′19″E
- Purpose: Flood mitigation, irrigation, water supply, and water conservation
- Status: Operational
- Construction began: August 1976
- Opening date: September 1979
- Owner: State Water Corporation

Dam and spillways
- Type of dam: Embankment dam
- Impounds: Peel River
- Height: 55.8 metres (183 ft)
- Length: 430 metres (1,410 ft)
- Width (crest): 8 metres (26 ft)
- Width (base): 195 metres (640 ft)
- Dam volume: 1,413 cubic metres (49,900 cu ft)
- Spillways: 1
- Spillway type: Morning glory
- Spillway capacity: 903 cubic metres per second (31,900 cu ft/s)

Reservoir
- Total capacity: 102,868 megalitres (3,632.7×10^{6} cu ft)
- Catchment area: 420 square kilometres (160 sq mi)
- Surface area: 542 hectares (1,340 acres)
- Maximum water depth: 30 metres (98 ft)
- Normal elevation: 518 metres (1,699 ft) AHD
- Website; Chaffey Dam at www.waternsw.com.au

Chaffey Dam is a minor ungated rock fill with clay core embankment dam with an uncontrolled morning glory spillway across the Peel River, located upstream of the city of Tamworth, in the New England region of New South Wales, Australia. The dam's purpose includes flood mitigation, irrigation, water supply, and water conservation.

== Location and features ==
Commenced in August 1976 and completed in September 1979, the Chaffey Dam is a minor dam on the Peel River, a tributary of the Namoi River, approximately 16 kilometres (9.9 mi) north of Nundle and 44 kilometres (27 mi) south-east of Tamworth. Water from the dam is released directly into the Peel River which is used by irrigators downstream of the dam, and for water supply of the city of Tamworth.

The dam wall comprises 1,413 cubic metres (49,900 cu ft) of rock fill is 55.8 metres (183 ft) high and is 430 metres (1,410 ft) long. The maximum water depth is 30 metres (98 ft) and at 100% capacity the dam wall holds back 62,830 megalitres (2,219×10^{6} cu ft) of water at 518 metres (1,699 ft) AHD. The surface area of the reservoir is 542 hectares (1,340 acres) and the catchment area is 420 square kilometres (160 sq mi).

The dam uses an unusual concrete morning glory bell-shaped uncontrolled spillway which is capable of discharging 903 cubic metres per second (31,900 cu ft/s). The spillway measures 25.81 metres (84.7 ft) in diameter and tapers down to 7.72 metres (25.3 ft). The spillway tower is 35.1 metres (115 ft) high.

Chaffey Dam provides valuable public recreation including swimming, sailing, boating and fishing.

=== Upgrade of facilities ===
An A$13 million upgrade of Chaffey Dam commenced during 2010 that involved the construction of a 35 metres (115 ft) auxiliary spillway with release plug, funded by the Government of New South Wales and was completed in early 2011. A second stage A$43.33 million augmentation commenced in 2013, funded by the Australian Government, the NSW Government and Tamworth Regional Council. This augmentation is expected to be completed during 2014 and involves raising the dam wall by 8 metres (26 ft) and subsequent works to raise the morning glory spillway and bridge deck. These works will increase the full supply level of the dam by 6.5 metres (21 ft), the dam's capacity from 62 gigalitres (2.2×10^{9} cu ft) to 100 gigalitres (3.5×10^{9} cu ft) and ensure it can withstand the maximum possible flood. The project also involves a realignment of roads on the western foreshore; the Tamworth-Nundle Road, and River Road.

=== Etymology ===
The dam is named in honor of Frank Chaffey, who represented Tamworth in the New South Wales Legislative Assembly between 1913 and 1940, and his son, Bill, who represented the same seat between 1940 and 1973.

== Gallery ==
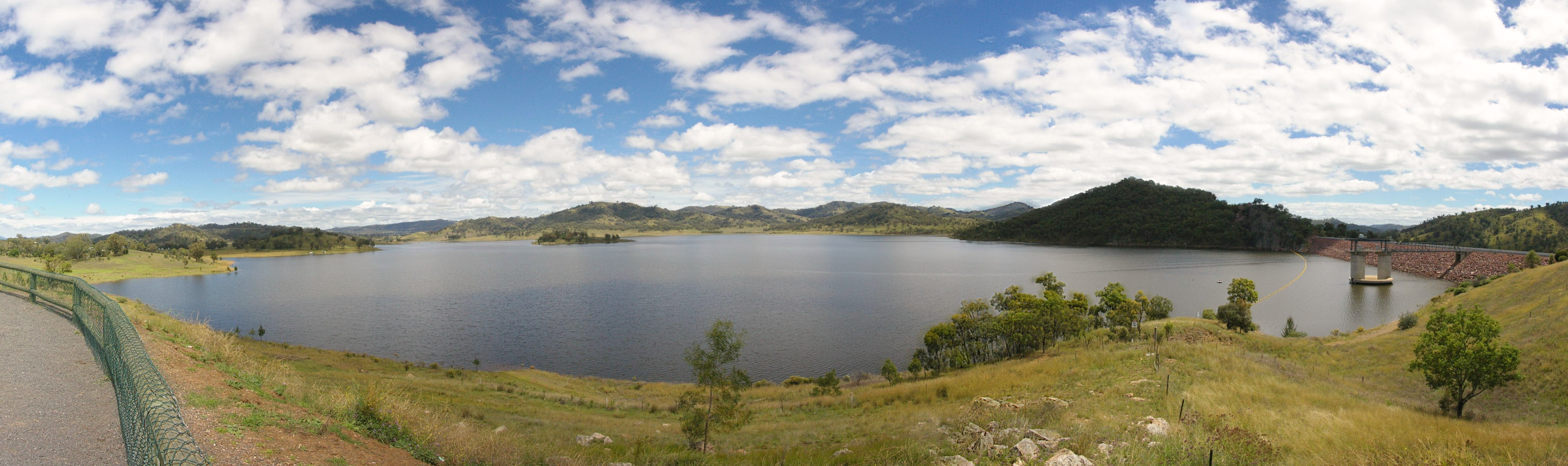
Chaffey Dam as viewed from lookout on Nundle Road, 2008.

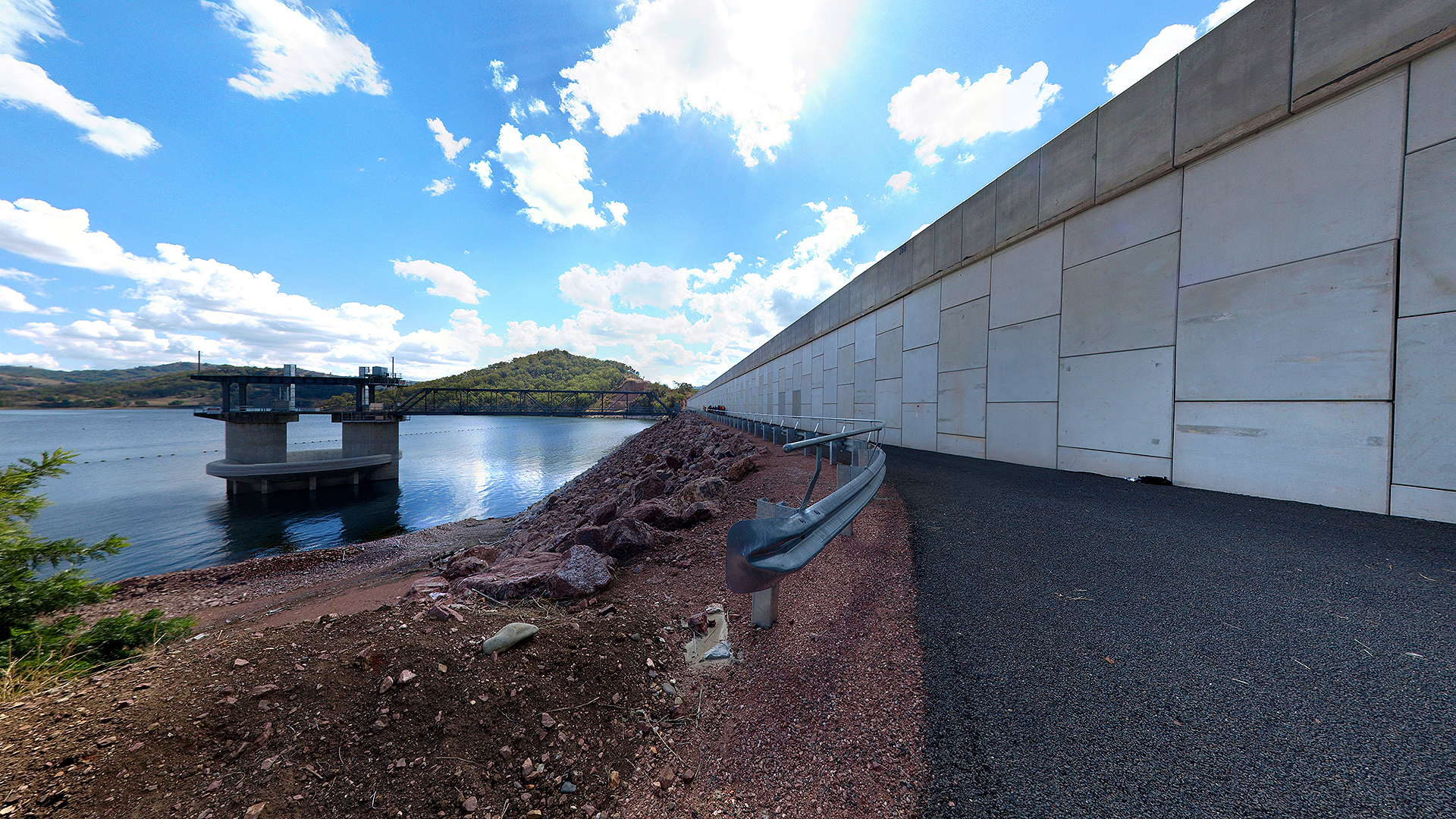
Lower section of wall, April 2018.

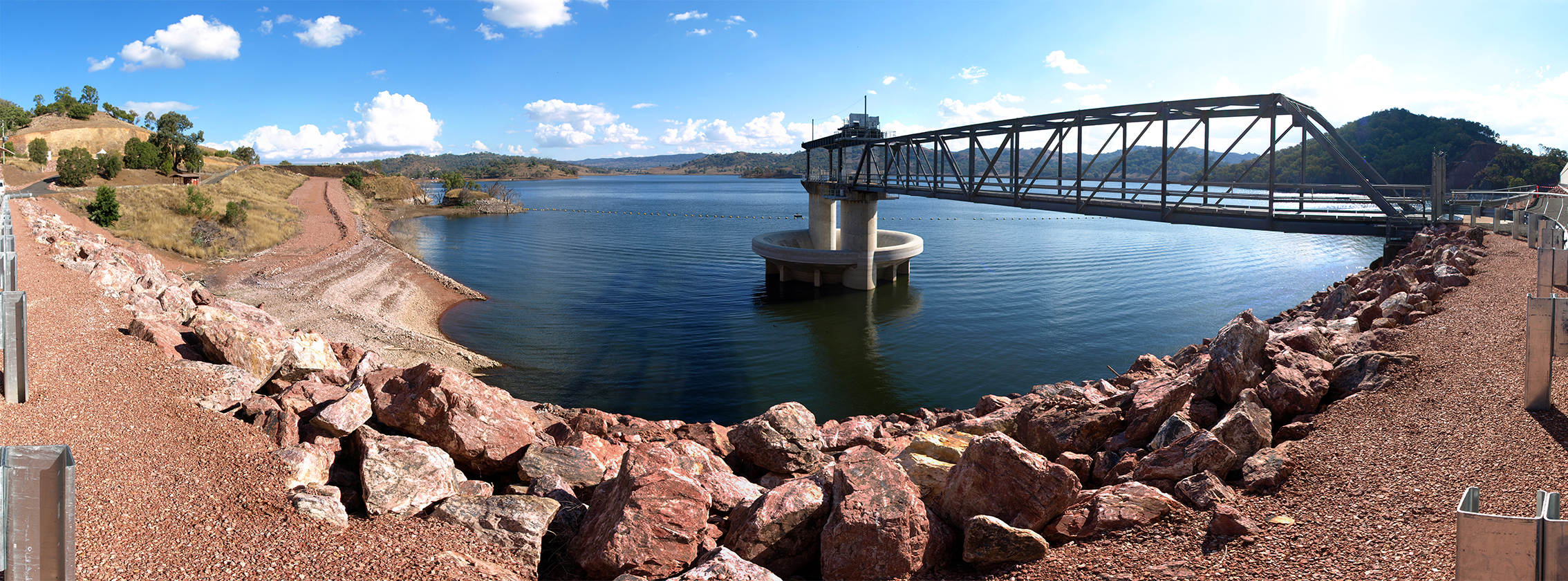
Spillway post upgrade, April 2018.

== See also ==
- List of dams and reservoirs in New South Wales
