= Manilla Shire =

Former local government area in New South Wales, Australia

Manilla Shire New South Wales
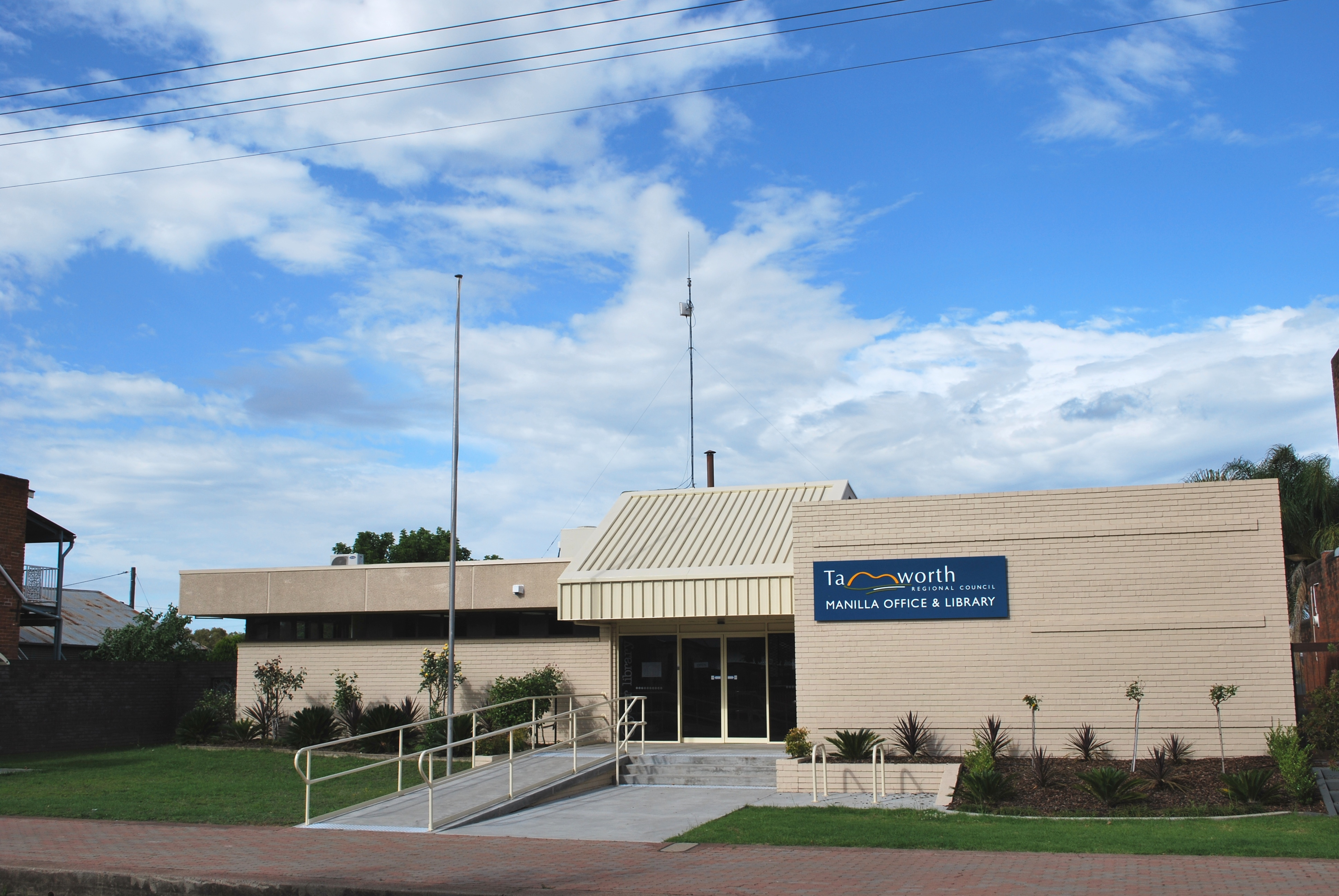
- Former Shire Offices, 2008
- Established: 1 January 1960
- Abolished: 17 March 2004
- Council seat: Manilla
- Region: New England

Manilla Shire was a local government area in the New England region of New South Wales, Australia.

Manilla Shire was proclaimed on 1 January 1960, created from the amalgamation of Mandowa Shire and the Municipality of Manilla.

The shire offices were based in Manilla.

Manilla Shire amalgamated with the City of Tamworth, Nundle Shire and parts of Parry Shire and Barraba Shire to form Tamworth Regional Council on 17 March 2004.
