= Barnard River Scheme =

The Barnard River Scheme is an inter-basin water transfer system in New South Wales, which can transfer water from the Barnard River in the upper Manning River catchment over the Mount Royal Range into the Hunter River.

The scheme was constructed between 1983 and 1985, to provide drought relief water for Bayswater Power Station which was being constructed at the same time.

The scheme consists of:

- a weir on the Barnard River, which transfers water into a small dam on Orham Creek via a gravity channel
- a pair of pumping stations which pump the water through pipelines to Bralga Tops
- another pipeline feeding downhill into Oaky Creek, which is a tributary of the Hunter River.

The scheme is shut down until needed but as of 2019 this scheme was decommissioned due to its rare use (with the last water transfer in 2011).
