= Piallamore, New South Wales =

Piallamore Tamworth, New South Wales
- Coordinates: 31°12′S 151°05′E
- Population: 261 (2016 census)
- Postcode(s): 2340
- Elevation: 410 m (1,345 ft)
- Location: 430 km (267 mi) from Sydney; 290 km (180 mi) from Port Macquarie; 115 km (71 mi) from Armidale
- LGA(s): Tamworth Regional Council
- County: Parry
- State electorate(s): Tamworth,
- Federal division(s): New England
Localities around Piallamore:
Nemingha		Kootingal
Calala	Piallamore
	Loomberah	Dungowan

Piallamore is a small outer suburb of Tamworth located about 15 km South-East of the city. It is located within the Parry County Cadastral division of New South Wales in the New England region. At the 2016 census, Piallamore had a population of 261 people.

Piallamore was first settled on the gently sloping hills at the base of the Moonbi Range and spread out to the fertile Peel River flats.

== Facilities/Services ==
- Anglican Church
- Tennis courts
- Bus service to Tamworth Primary and Secondary schools
- NSW Rural Fire Service brigade
- Public roads
