= Hanging Rock, New South Wales =

Town in New South Wales, Australia

Coordinates: 31°29′S 151°12′E

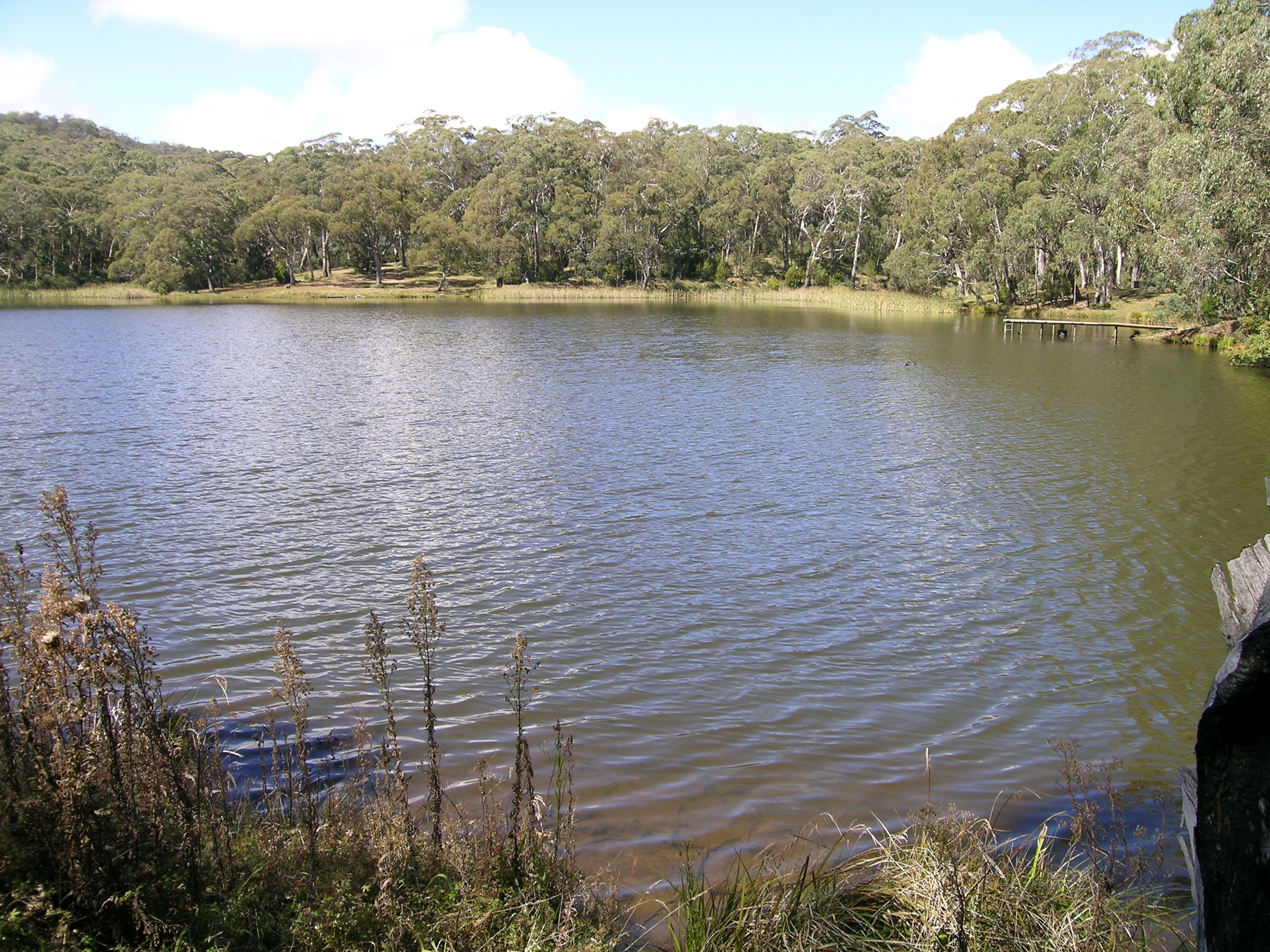
Sheba Dam No. 1, Hanging Rock, NSW

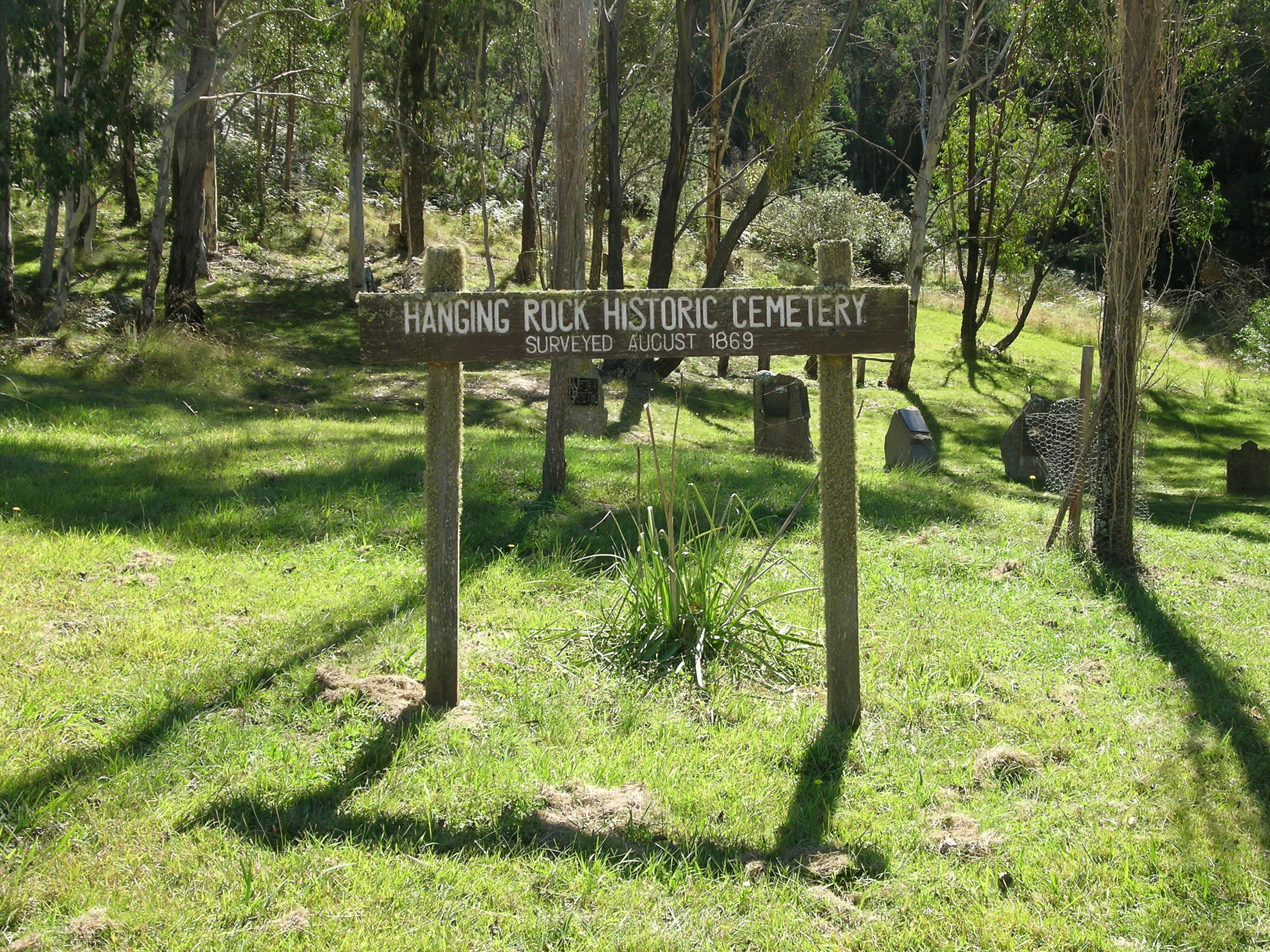
Hanging Rock Historic Cemetery

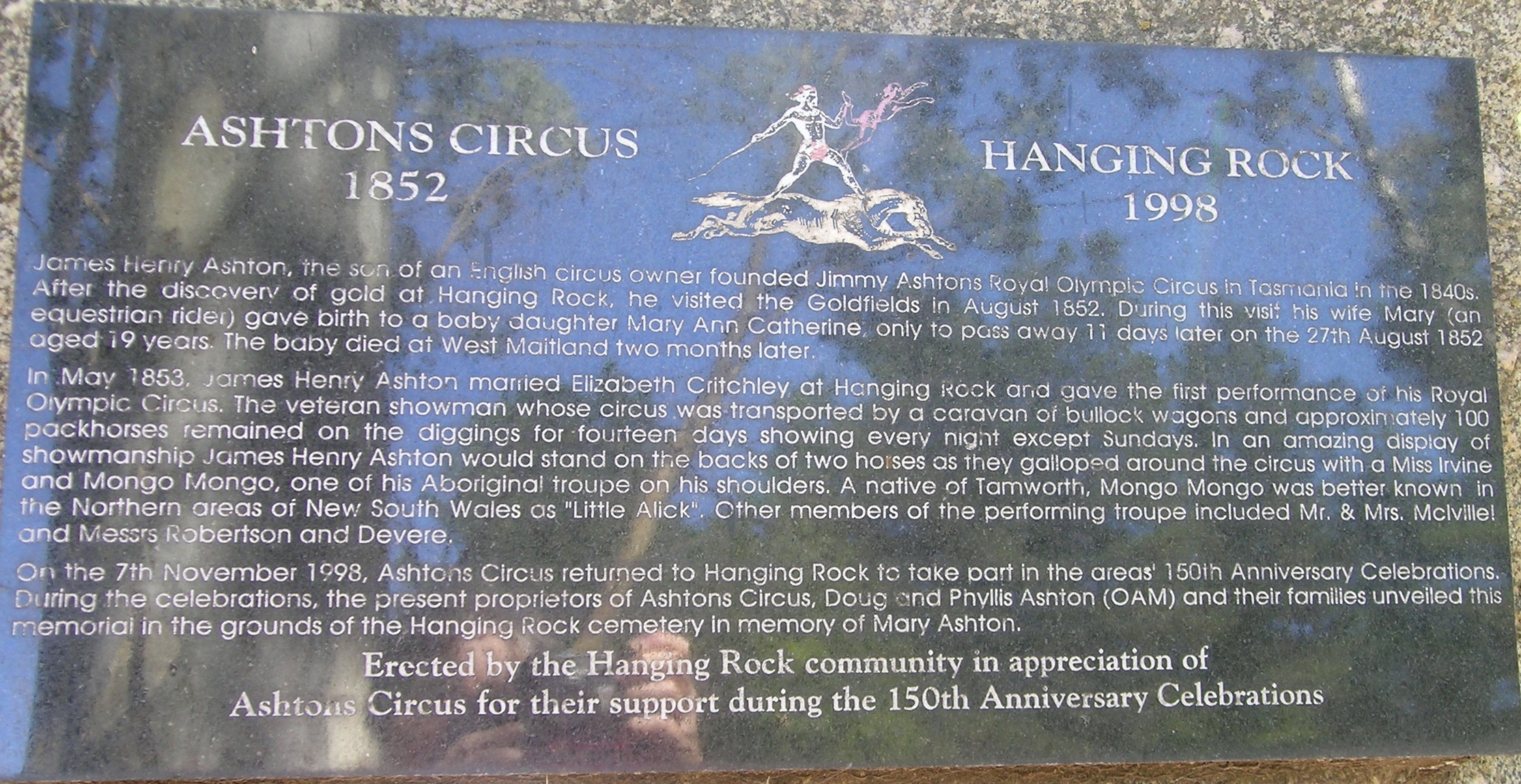
Ashton Memorial, Hanging Rock Cemetery, NSW

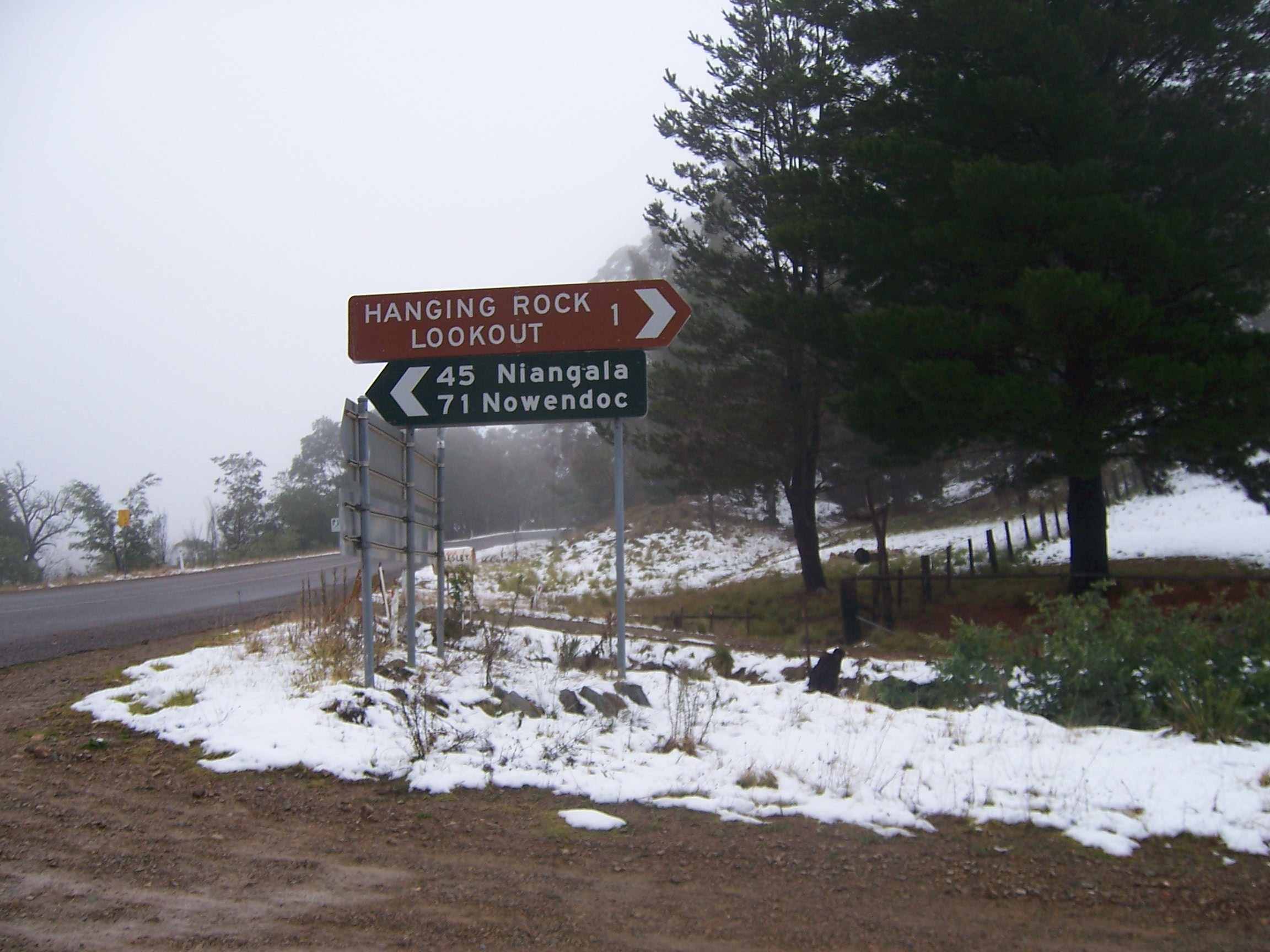
Hanging Rock area in winter.

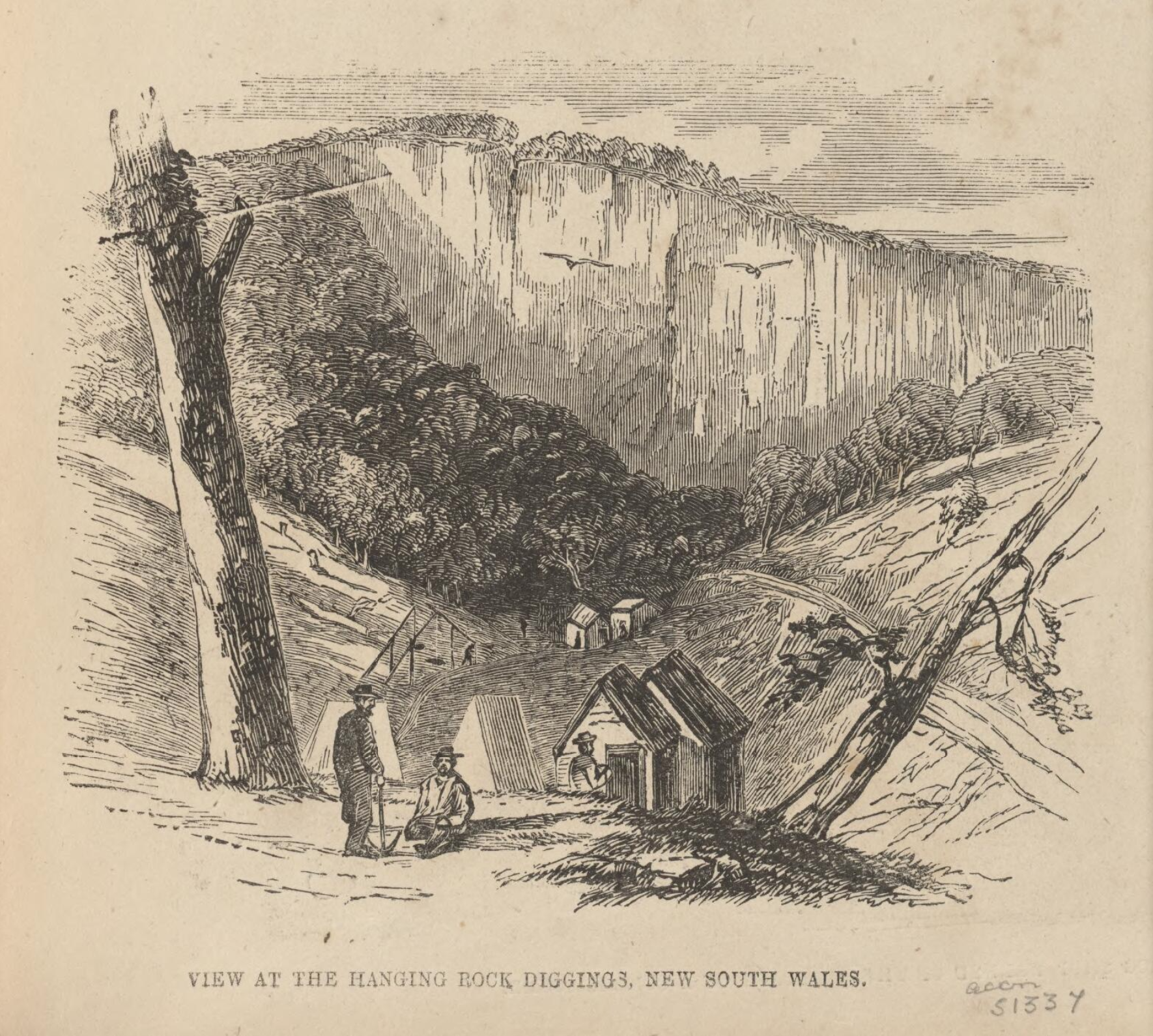
View at Hanging Rock diggings, New South Wales in 1857

Hanging Rock is a gold mining village and also rock face on the Northern Tablelands, New South Wales, Australia. This former gold mining town is situated about 10 km south east of Nundle. The village is part of the Tamworth Regional Council district and Parry County. Hanging Rock's geographical coordinates are 31° 29′ 0″ South, 151° 12′ 0″ East and the elevation is about 1100 m. Due to the high altitude of the village, Hanging Rock and the surrounding mountains can occasionally receive a snow fall on the coldest of winter days. At the 2021 census, Hanging Rock had a population of 98.

== History ==
The Hanging Rock Run of about 15,360 acres (6,220 ha), with a grazing capacity of approximately 500 head of cattle, was taken up by Nathan Burrows in 1848. Hanging Rock took its name from a huge cliff face that overlooked the valley below.

In August 1851, while out riding his run, Nathan Burrows spotted a stockman panning for gold along Swamp Creek. The stockman had stumbled across his good fortune while washing his pannikin after a meal and found a few shiny specs. Burrows rode to Tamworth to inform the local storekeeper, William Cohen, who within a few days' rode to Hanging Rock, along with Charles Parsons and William Blackborn, to check out Burrow's claim and they found more gold. Thus a gold rush commenced to this area. By February 1852, 27 cradles were operating with some 200 diggers searching for their fortune.

During 1853, American gold miners dug, an approximately 23 km, water race from Callaghans Swamp to underneath the Hanging Rock cliff face. Also that year Californians dug another water race from the swamp at the head of Dangars Gully to Nuggety Gully. In 1882, it took about twelve months to cut a 13 km water race from the Barnard River on the eastern side of the rough mountainous Great Dividing Range to the western side of the Range. Just south of Hanging Rock village are the Sheba Dams (with a surface area of 3.6 ha) which were erected by hand over a three-week period in 1888 to serve the sluicing needs of the miners. This construction was carried out by the Mt Sheba Company which leased the water rights for the area. Other water races were also constructed to feed various other mines around Bowling Alley Point and Hanging Rock.

Joseph Ruzicka arrived at Hanging Rock in 1879 and later went prospecting in spite of having little knowledge of this skill. He discovered one of the richest strikes of the Hanging Rock area at Harden's Hill, across from the local cemetery. Here Joe extracted 30 ounces of gold for every 26 cm that he dug earning about £3,000 in one day. Ruzicka later found another good location where John Lord had worked 20 years earlier and had only found 30 oz of gold. Here Ruzicka found 10 to 12 pounds of gold a few inches beneath the surface. Within ten days of the discovery, he was in possession of 344½ oz of gold, when he was escorted to the Tamworth bank, by the Senior Sergeant. Ruzicka was paid £1,300/9/9 for ten days' work. He continued to make further good finds of gold plus some silver. In 1883 he sold his lease, with the new owner finding 15 oz of gold, but he did not make any further significant finds. The Black Snake Gold Mine on Nundle Road has been placed on the Register of the National Estate.

At its peak Hanging Rock had a population of several thousand people and was made up of several small communities, some having their own churches, schools, School of Arts building, general stores and hotels. Today Hanging Rock has a community hall, a New South Wales Rural Fire Service station and a few homes. The main industry is agriculture and tourism. At the 2021 census, the population of Hanging Rock was 98.

== Attractions ==
The Lookout, about 1 km off the Nundle Road, offers a scenic vantage point with excellent views of the Nundle valley below. Sheba Dams, south of the village, is an interesting spot for an outing with picnic and barbecue facilities in a bush setting abundant with trees, birds, lizards, wallabies and pademelons. There is also a 1.2 km bush walk. This is regarded as good fossicking country with zircons, sapphires and other semi-precious stones to be found.

Hanging Rock is a close community with several special events held annually. One of them is the 'Tour de Rocque', which is organized to raise money for the Westpac Rescue Helicopter and will take place on the 1st Sunday of November. The ride will start from the Peel River bridge at Bowling Alley Point, and will take the riders up to Sheba Dam, a 600 m elevation over a distance of 22 km. There is also the 'King of the Rock' fun-run, which starts at Nundle Recreation Ground, and will also finish at Sheba Dam.

== Literature ==
- Lobsey, Ian: Gold and Grit: A History of Nundle Shire Council. 1981.
