= Mandowa Shire =

Former local government area in New South Wales, Australia

Mandowa Shire New South Wales
- Established: 7 March 1906
- Abolished: 1 January 1960
- Council seat: Manilla
- Region: New England

Mandowa Shire was a local government area in the New England region of New South Wales, Australia.

Mandowa Shire was proclaimed on 7 March 1906, one of 134 shires created after the passing of the Local Government (Shires) Act 1905.

The shire offices were based in Manilla.

The Shire was amalgamated with the Municipality of Manilla to form Manilla Shire on 1 January 1960.
