= Woko National Park =

National park in Australia

- IUCN category II (national park)
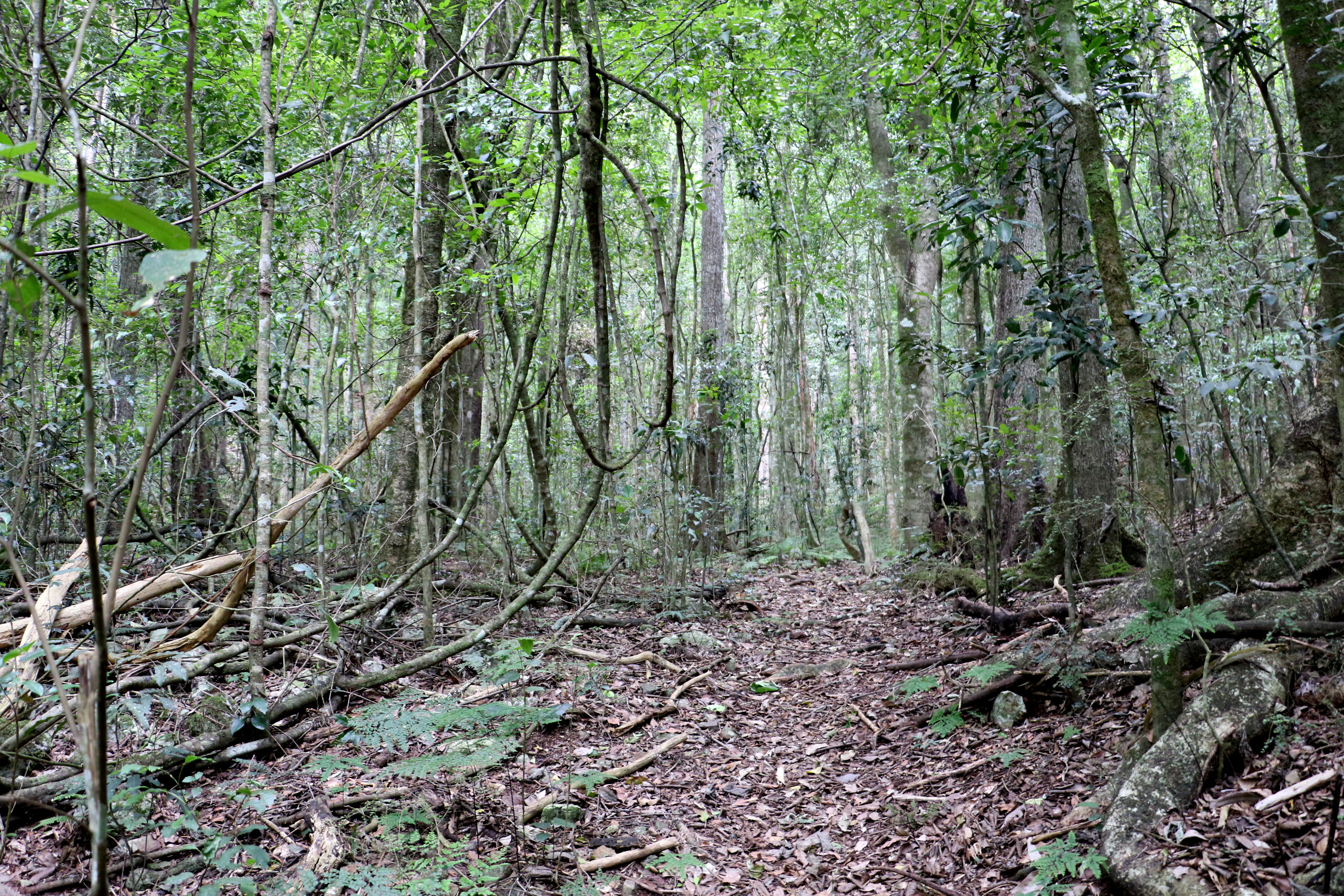
- depauperate rainforest at Woko

- Location within New South Wales
- Location: New South Wales
- Coordinates: 31°45′17″S 151°47′24″E
- Area: 85.98 km^{2} (33.20 sq mi)
- Established: 1982
- Governing body: NSW National Parks & Wildlife Service
- Website: Official website

Woko is a national park in New South Wales, Australia, 243 km north of Sydney.

The Woko National Park is characterized by a steep and ragged landscape. There are vast areas of rainforest, arid places with rocky outcroppings and groves of eucalyptus. The Manning River flows through the park and its riverside locations are used by picnickers and hikers.

The average elevation of the terrain is 497 metres. The average summer temperature is between 16.8 °C and 25.9 °C, and the winter temperature is between 20.1 °C and 14.4 °C.

== Wildlife ==
The Woko National Park is a habitat for several species of birds and animals. The forests, grasslands and rocky regions of the park are home to birds like the lyrebird and the wedge-tailed eagle. A number of threatened species of animals live here, including the brush-tailed rock-wallaby.

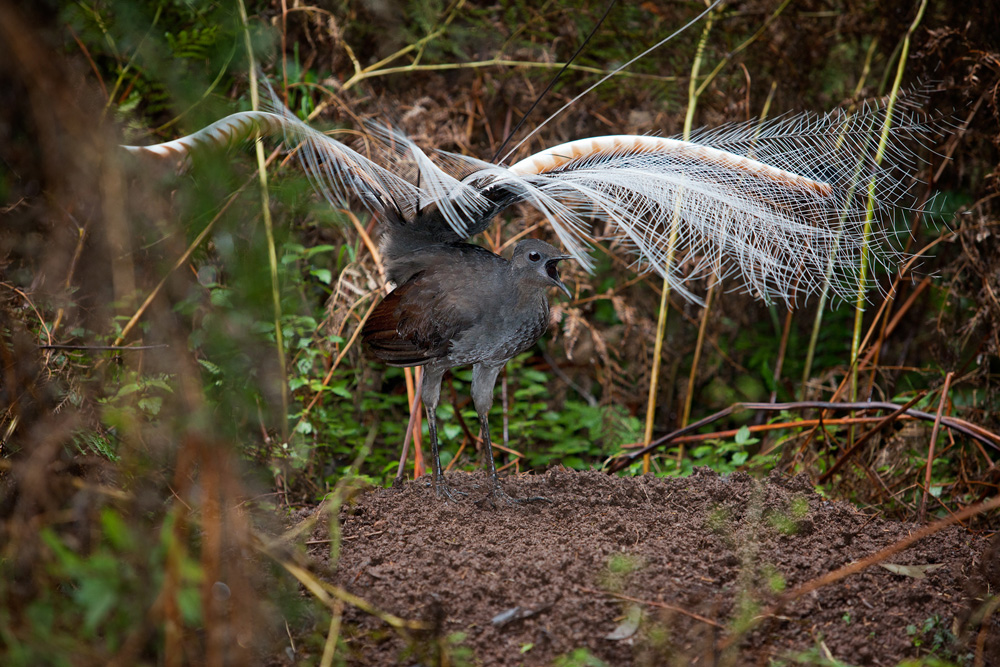
Lyrebird

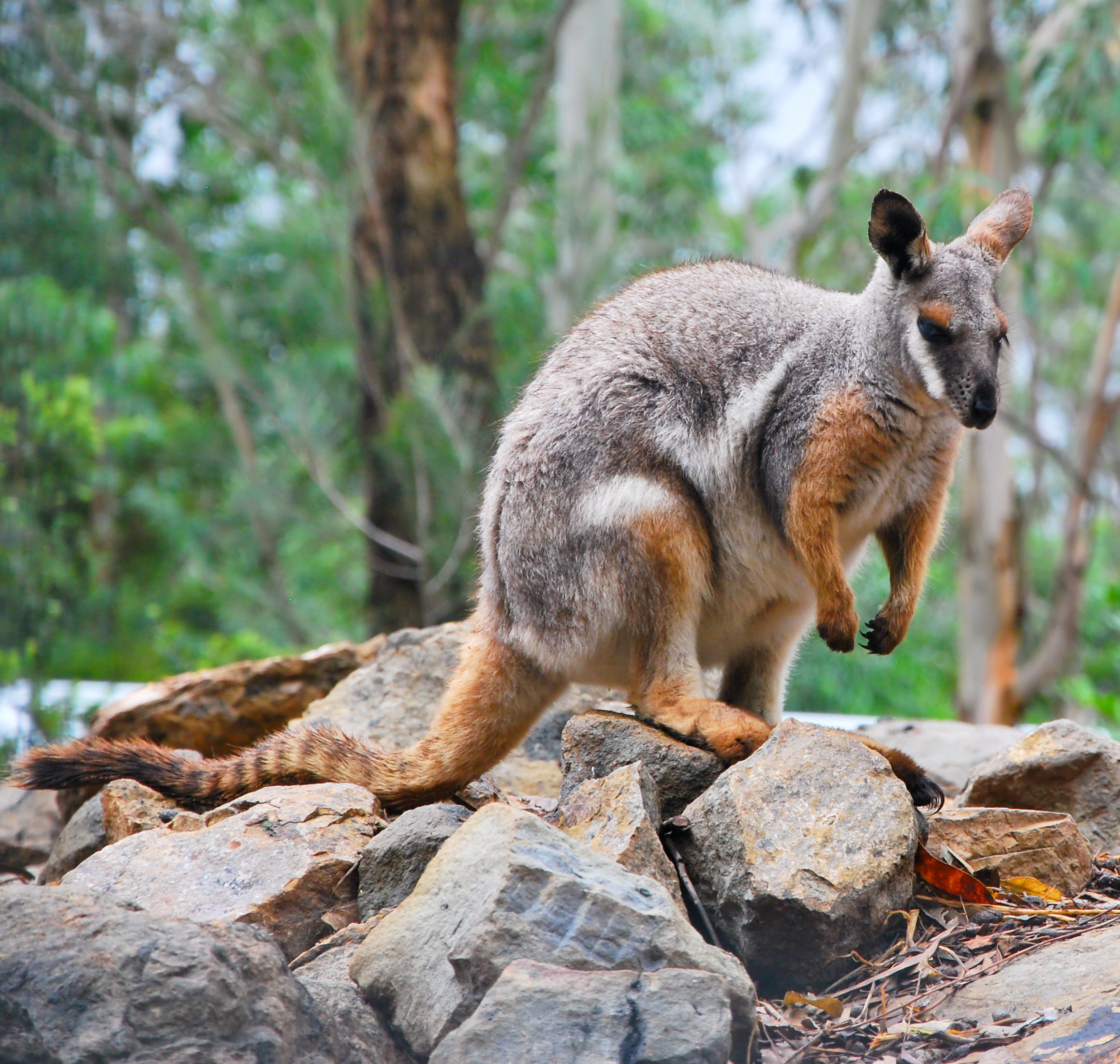
Brush-tailed rock-wallaby

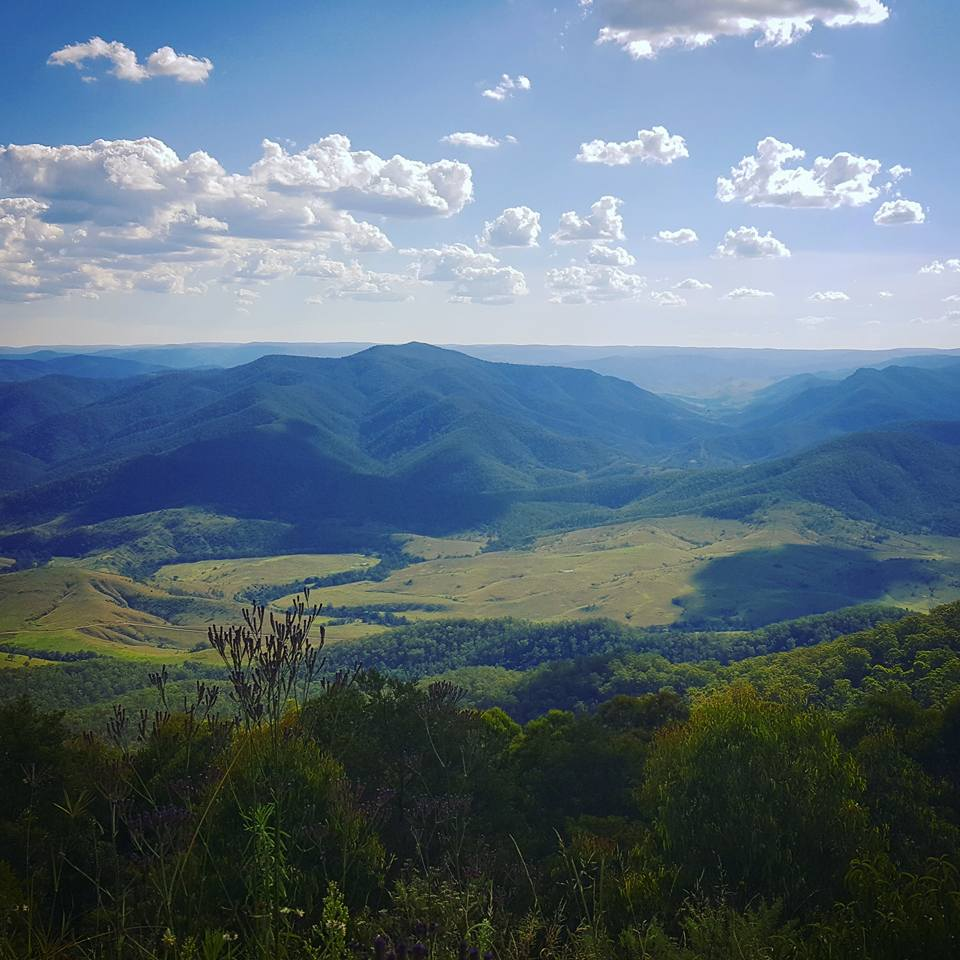
Overlook of Woko National Park, Monkeycot nature reserve, and the Giro valley from Carson's Pioneer Lookout, Mare's Run.

== See also ==
- Protected areas of New South Wales
