= Peel River (New South Wales) =

Coordinates: 30°55′S 150°29′E

Peel River Cockburn River
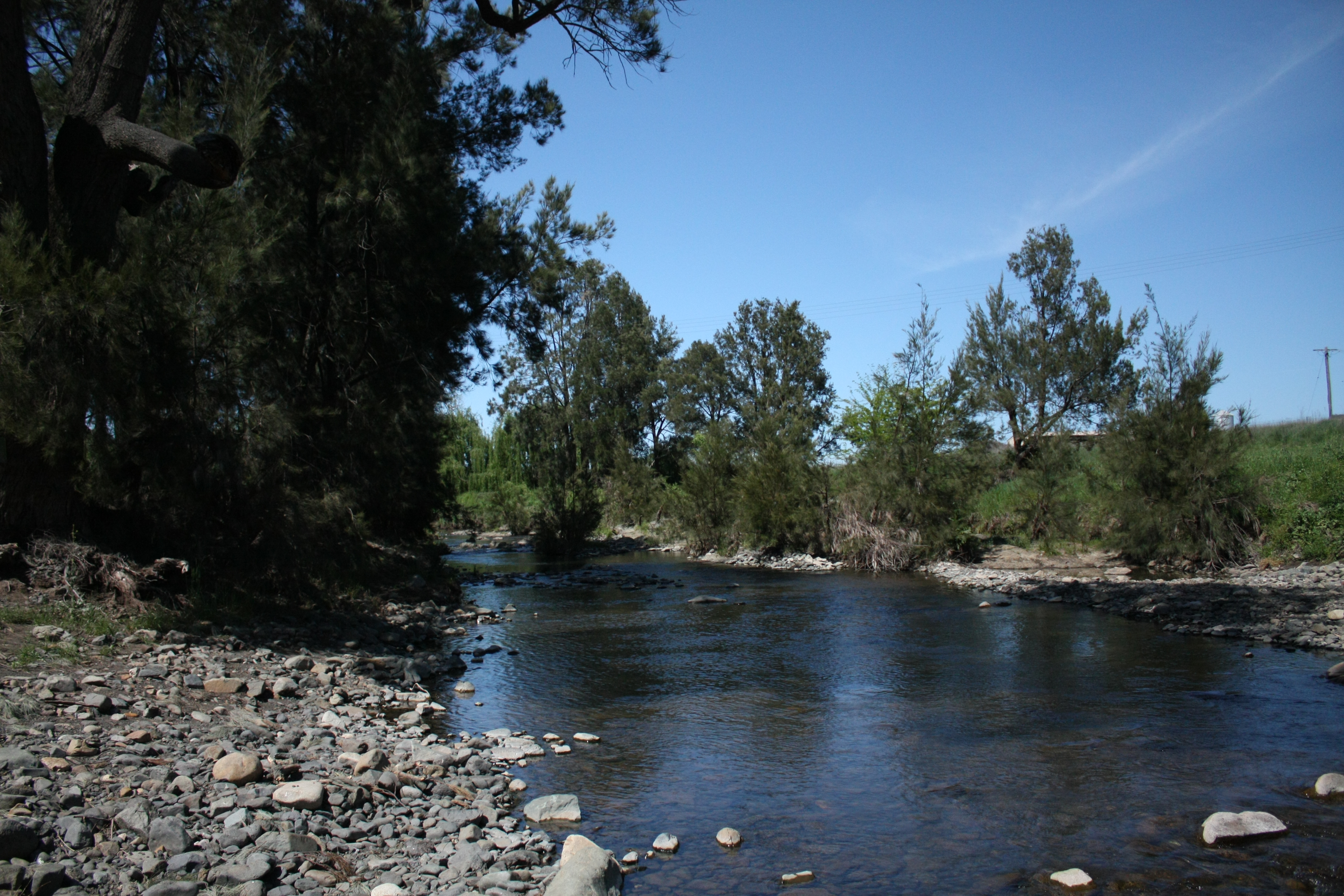
- Peel River at Nundle
- Etymology: in honour of Sir Robert Peel

Location
- Country: Australia
- State: New South Wales
- Region: IBRA: New England Tablelands
- District: Northern Tablelands
- Municipalities: Tamworth, Gunnedah

Physical characteristics
- Source: Liverpool Range, Great Dividing Range, and Mount Royal Range
  - location: south of Nundle
  - elevation: 743 m (2,438 ft)
- Mouth: confluence with the Namoi River
  - location: south of Keepit Dam
  - elevation: 286 m (938 ft)
- Length: 210 km (130 mi)

Basin features
- River system: Murray–Darling basin
- Tributaries
  - right: Cockburn River
- Bridges: Peel River railway bridge, Tamworth
- Reservoir: Chaffey Dam

Peel River, a watercourse that is part of the Namoi catchment within the Murray–Darling basin, is located in the North West Slopes and Plains district of New South Wales, Australia.

== Course and features ==
The river rises on the northern slopes of the Liverpool Range, at the junction of the Great Dividing Range and Mount Royal Range, south of the village of Nundle, and flows generally north, west and north west and emerges into the Liverpool Plains near Tamworth. The Peel River is joined by thirteen tributaries, including the Cockburn River, and flows through Chaffey Dam before reaching its mouth at the confluence with the Namoi River; dropping 457 metres (1,499 ft) over its course of 210 kilometres (130 mi).

From source to mouth, the river passes through or near the villages of Nundle, Woolomin and Piallamore.

The Peel River was first discovered by European settlers in 1818 by John Oxley and named by Oxley in honour of Sir Robert Peel, an important British politician at the time of its discovery by British settlers in Australia.

At Tamworth, the river is crossed by the Main North line via the heritage-listed Tamworth rail bridge, completed in 1882.

The famous Australian freshwater native fish Murray cod, Maccullochella peelii, was named after the Peel River by Major Mitchell, who sketched and scientifically described and named one of the numerous Murray cod his men caught from the river on his 1838 expedition.

== See also ==
- List of rivers of Australia
- Rivers of New South Wales
