= Nundle, New South Wales =

Nundle New South Wales
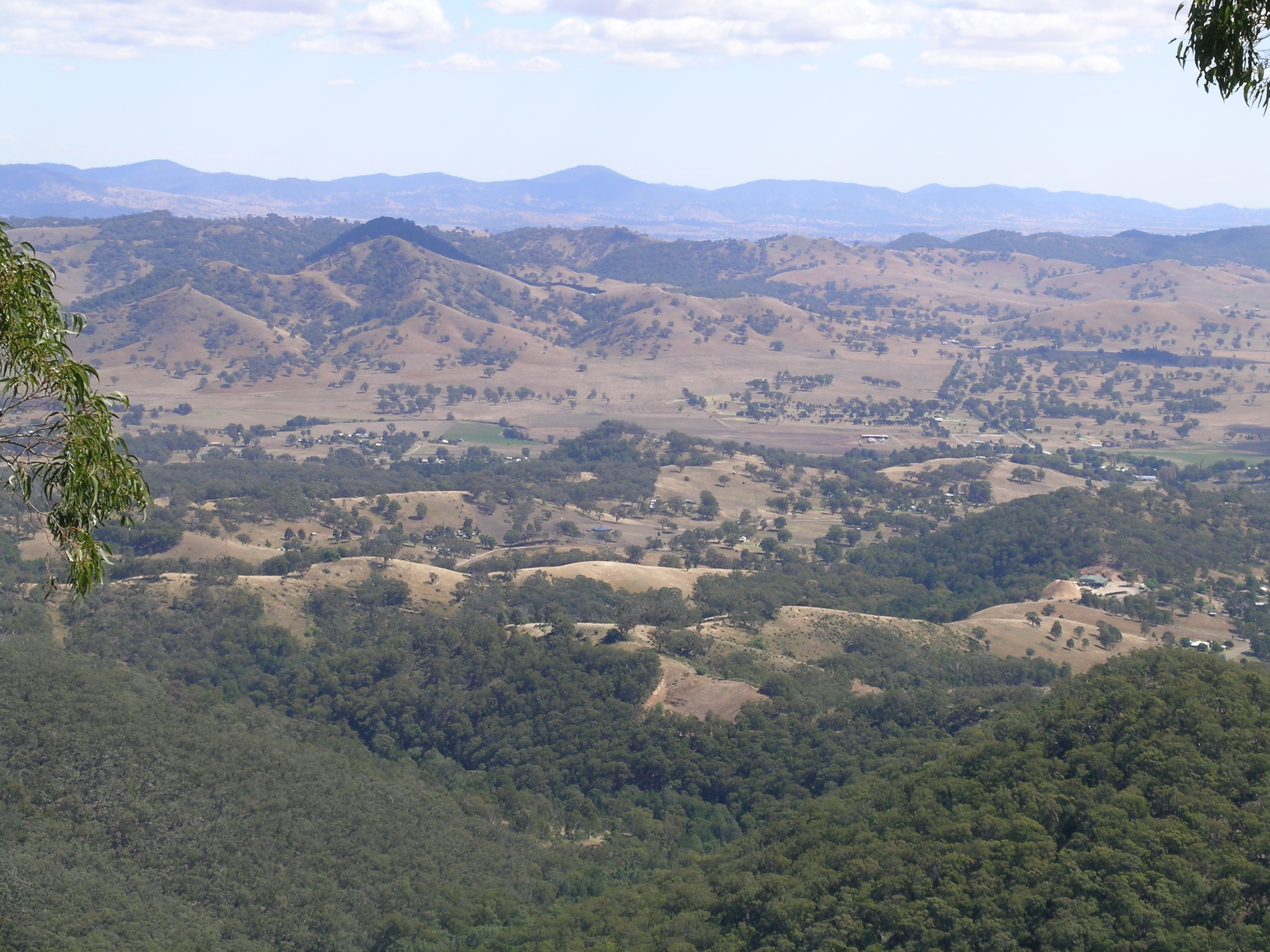
- Nundle valley from the Hanging Rock lookout

- Coordinates: 31°28′S 151°08′E
- Population: 289 (2006 census)
- Established: 1885
- Postcode(s): 2340
- Elevation: 609 m (1,998 ft)
- LGA(s): Tamworth Regional Council
- County: Parry
- State electorate(s): Tamworth,
- Federal division(s): New England

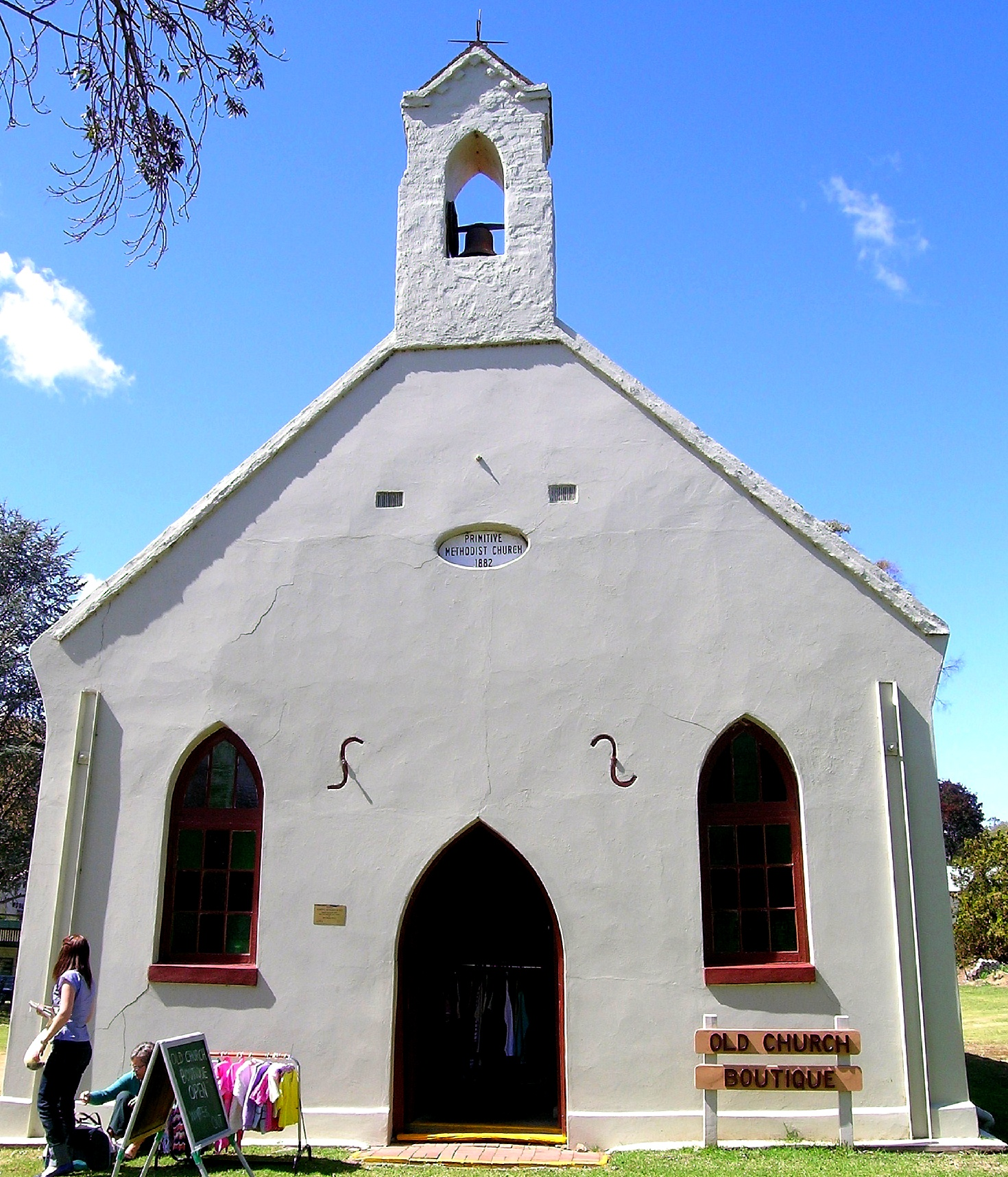
The Primitive Methodist Church built in 1882

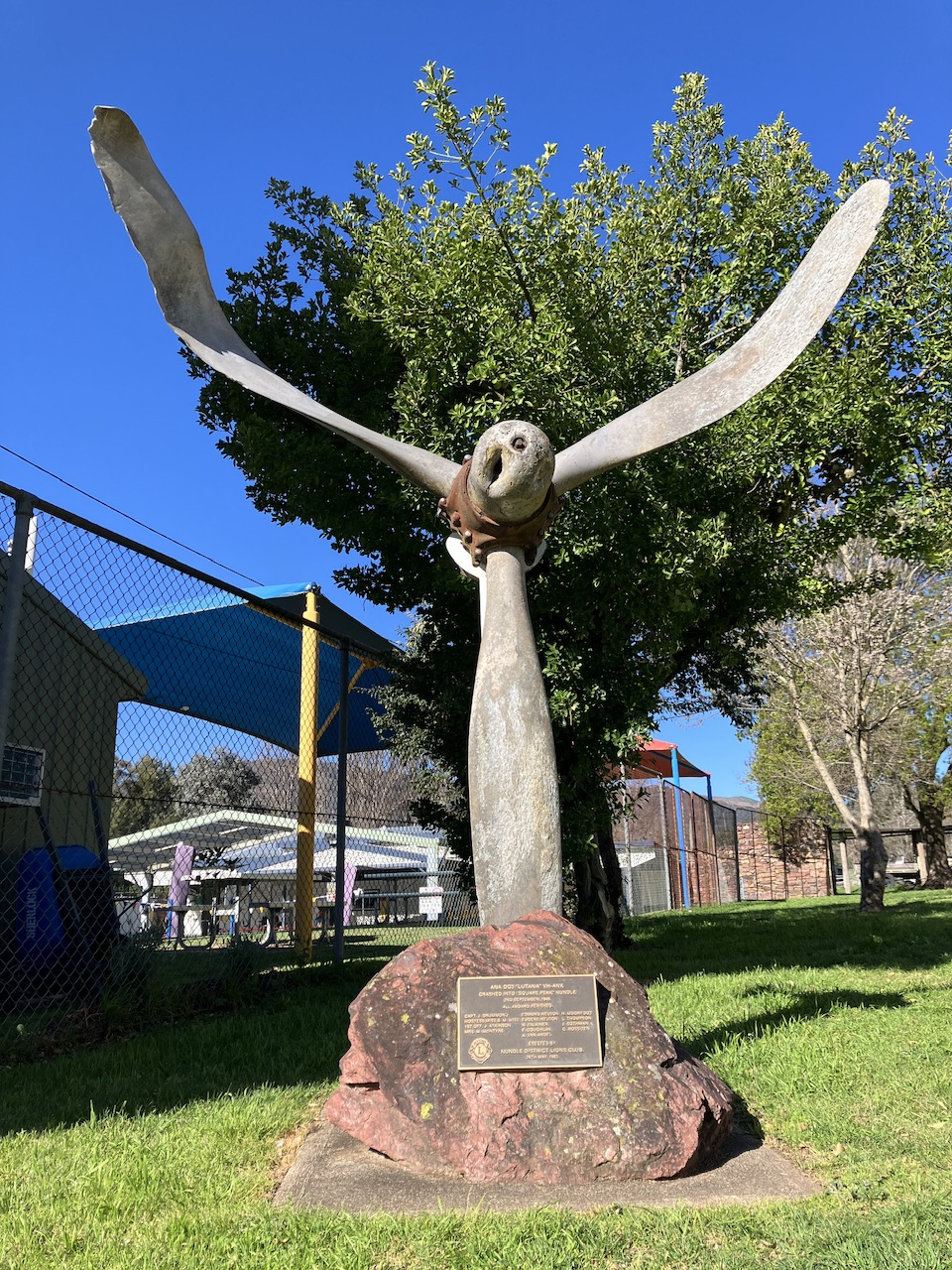
Memorial in Nundle commemorating the crash of the Lutana in 1948

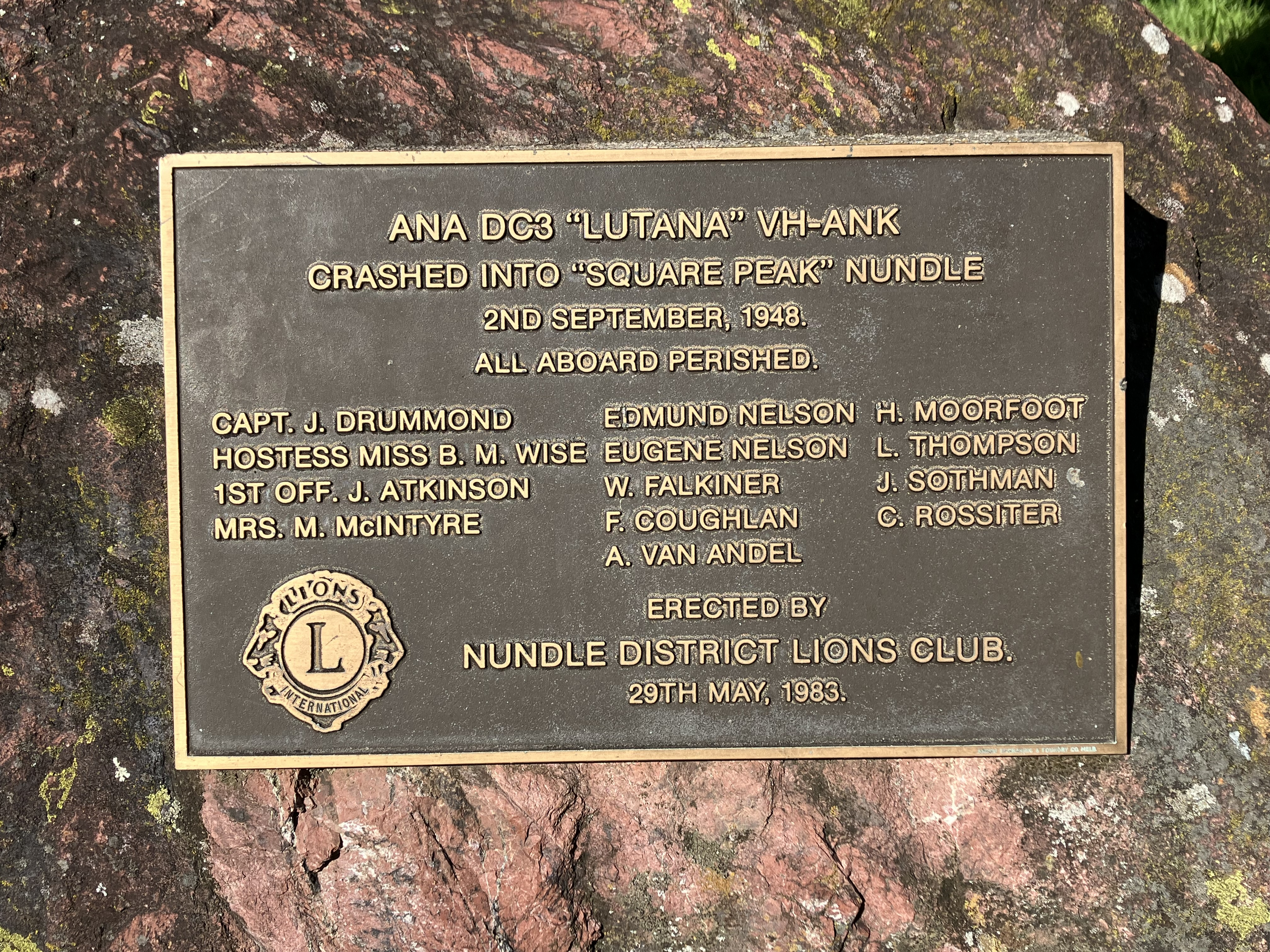
Plaque on the memorial

Nundle is a village in the New England region of New South Wales, Australia. It was formerly the centre of Nundle Shire, but most of this area, including the village of Nundle, was absorbed into Tamworth Regional Council in 2004. The village is 400 km north of Sydney and about 56 km south east of Tamworth past Chaffey Dam via a good sealed road. In the 2006 census Nundle had a population of 289. Nundle is located at the southern end of Fossickers Way.

== History ==
Nundle was established at the foot of the Great Dividing Range when gold was discovered at "The Hanging Rock" and nearby Swamp Creek in 1852. By June 1852 there were 300 diggers on the fields at Oakenville Creek. Prospectors from California, Europe and China were also digging along the Peel River and up the mountain slopes. By 1865 the population was around 500 with about 50 businesses in operation. A public school was completed during December, 1871 and lessons commenced there in 1872. Nundle was declared a town in 1885. In 1924 the Peel River Bridge was constructed and in 1941 electricity was connected to the town. During 1966 the swimming pool was opened by the Rt Hon. Ian Sinclair. The population of Nundle Shire was 1350 in 1969. In 1979 Premier Neville Wran opened the newly completed Chaffey Dam. Sheep, cattle and timber are the economic mainstays of this village nowadays.

This is a scenic village, with historic buildings, the Nundle Woollen Mill, old Court House, Peel Inn and Primitive Methodist Church which are a few examples of existing 19th century architecture there. Nundle Courthouse (former) and Police Station have been placed on the Register of the National Estate. Nundle is noted as one of the best areas in the State for crystals. Some gold and other precious stones to be found include zircons, green jasper, sapphires and serpentine minerals. Nundle is a popular tourist destination for both casual travellers and motorcycle enthusiasts. Nearby is the interesting Hanging Rock mining village with good views of the Nundle valley.

In 1948, the Douglas DC-3 Lutana crashed into Square Peak, west-south-west of Nundle during a flight between Brisbane and Sydney. All 13 occupants of the Lutana were killed. The plane was found two days after the accident, 60 miles off course. One of the damaged propellers from the aeroplane is now part of a memorial in the town.

A new bridge across the Peel River at Nundle was completed in early 2008, with the funding of $683,000 provided by the NSW State Government.

In July 2008 the rare Euphrasia arguta was rediscovered in a State Forest near Nundle. This plant was last recorded in 1904 and is believed to have been regenerated after fire control activities the previous summer.

== Facilities ==
- Caravan and cabin park
- Peel Inn Hotel (pub/bar)
- Methodist Church
- Nundle Memorial Town Hall
- Bus service to Tamworth secondary schools
- General Store
- Nundle Pre-School
- Nundle Public School
- Rural Health Service
- Post office
- Pony Club
- Golf and Bowling Club
- Tennis Club with synthetic surface tennis courts
- Nundle Branch Library (part of the Central Northern Regional Library)

== Events ==
The annual Go for Gold Festival is held each Easter long-weekend, attracting around 15,000 visitors. Independent State Member for Tamworth told Parliament "that visitors had come to Nundle from all points of the compass during the Easter weekend to enjoy the relaxed atmosphere and the beautiful setting." The Great Nundle Dog Race, only open to working dogs, is run on the first Sunday in May and attracts many visitors. This event helped to raise money for sporting equipment, computers, books and excursions for students at the Nundle Public School. The first Sunday in November sees the running of both the Le Tour do Rocque (cycle race) & King of the Rock fun run, raising money for the Westpac Helicopter Service.
