= Grundy Mountain =

Mountain in New South Wales, Australia

- Mount Grundy
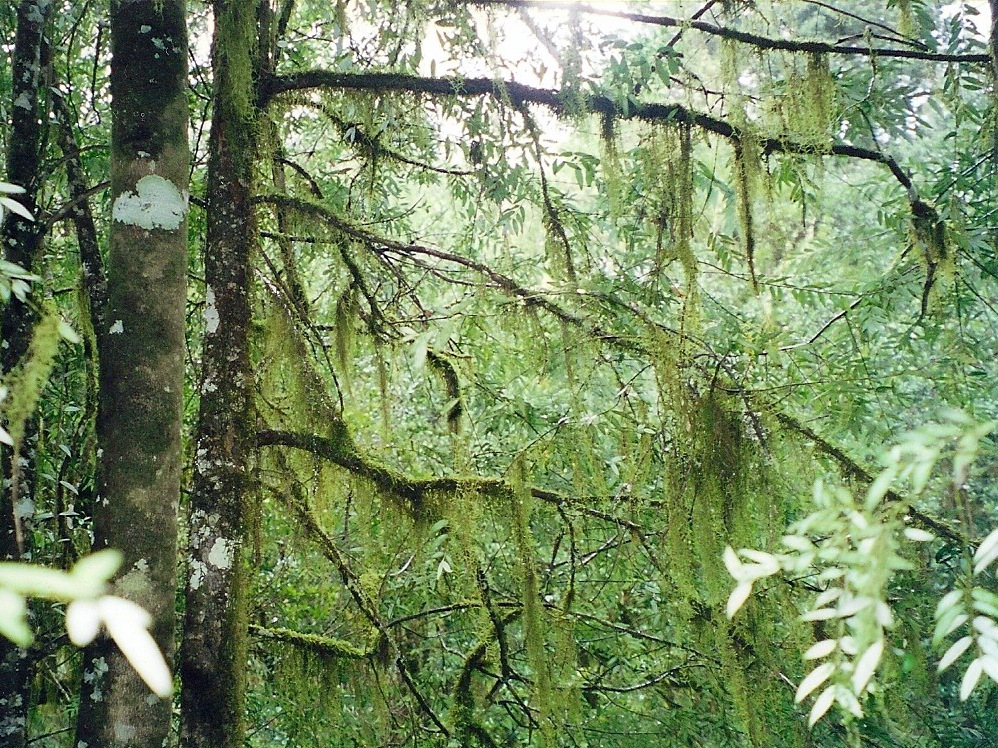
- Southern sassafras cool temperate rainforest at the head of the Tia River, Australia

Highest point
- Elevation: 1,463 m (4,800 ft)
- Coordinates: 31°20′S 151°39′E

Geography
- Location within New South Wales
- Location: Northern Tablelands, New South Wales, Australia
- Parent range: Great Dividing Range
- Topo map: Branga Plains

Grundy Mountain or Mount Grundy, a mountain of the Great Dividing Range, is located on the Northern Tablelands of New South Wales, Australia.

With an elevation of 1,463 metres (4,800 ft) above sea level, Grundy Mountain is situated between Walcha and Tamworth in the Mummel Gulf National Park.

The native vegetation of the mountain has mostly been cleared for farming and pine plantations. However, there are remnant areas of eucalyptus forest with the rare purple pepperbush. Of special note is the cool temperate rainforest at the head of the Tia River. It includes geographically isolated plants such as the southern sassafras, white mountain banksia, mountain walnut and the black olive berry. A new lizard species in the genus Lampropholis was discovered on Mount Grundy in 1995.

== See also ==
- List of mountains of New South Wales
