= Tia River =

Coordinates: 31°08′S 151°55′E

Tia River Crimps Creek, Crokers River
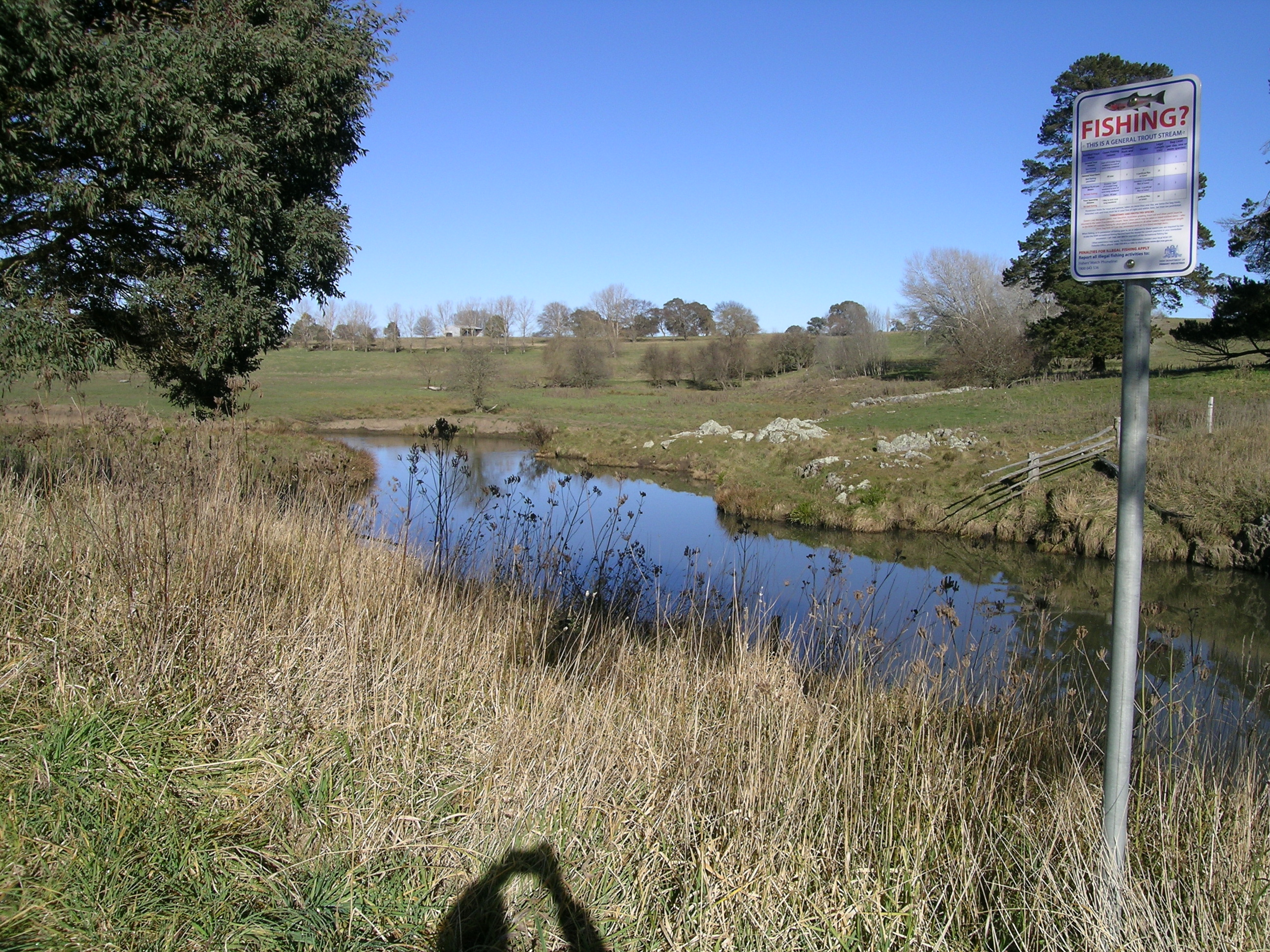
- Tia River near the Oxley Highway

Location
- Country: Australia
- State: New South Wales
- IBRA: New England Tablelands
- District: Northern Tablelands
- local government area: Walcha

Physical characteristics
- Source: Mount Grundy, Great Dividing Range
  - location: near Tia
  - elevation: 1,360 m (4,460 ft)
- Mouth: confluence with the Apsley River
  - location: near Tia
  - elevation: 457 m (1,499 ft)
- Length: 62 km (39 mi)

Basin features
- River system: Macleay River catchment
- National parks: Mummel Gulf NP, Oxley Wild Rivers NP

Tia River /ˈtaɪˈɑːr/, a perennial stream of the Macleay River catchment, is located in the Northern Tablelands district of New South Wales, Australia.

== Course and features ==
The river rises below Mount Grundy on the eastern slopes of the Great Dividing Range southwest of Tia, and flows generally northeast before reaching its confluence with the Apsley River, northwest of Tia. The river descends 905 metres (2,969 ft) over its 52 kilometres (32 mi) course; spilling over the Tia Falls in the Oxley Wild Rivers National Park.

The river is transversed by the Oxley Highway.

Previously the river was known as Crimps Creek and also Crokers River which John Oxley had named this stream, in honour of the First Secretary of the Admiralty.

The country above the Tia Falls is a rich grazing area used for rearing livestock. The upper parts of the Tia River have remarkable cool temperate rainforests, with unusual species such as southern sassafras, white mountain banksia and black olive berry.

Tia River is a general trout stream.

== Gallery ==
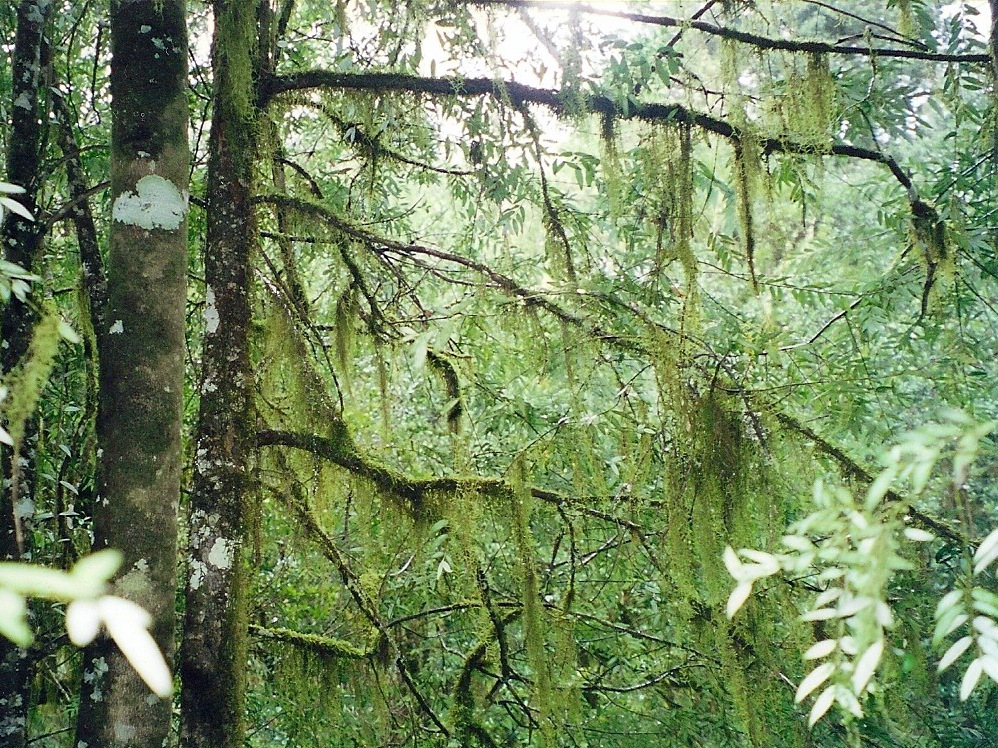
Cool temperate rainforest at the head of the Tia River.

== See also ==
- List of rivers of Australia
- Rivers of New South Wales
