= Yarrowitch River =

Coordinates: 31°02′S 152°03′E

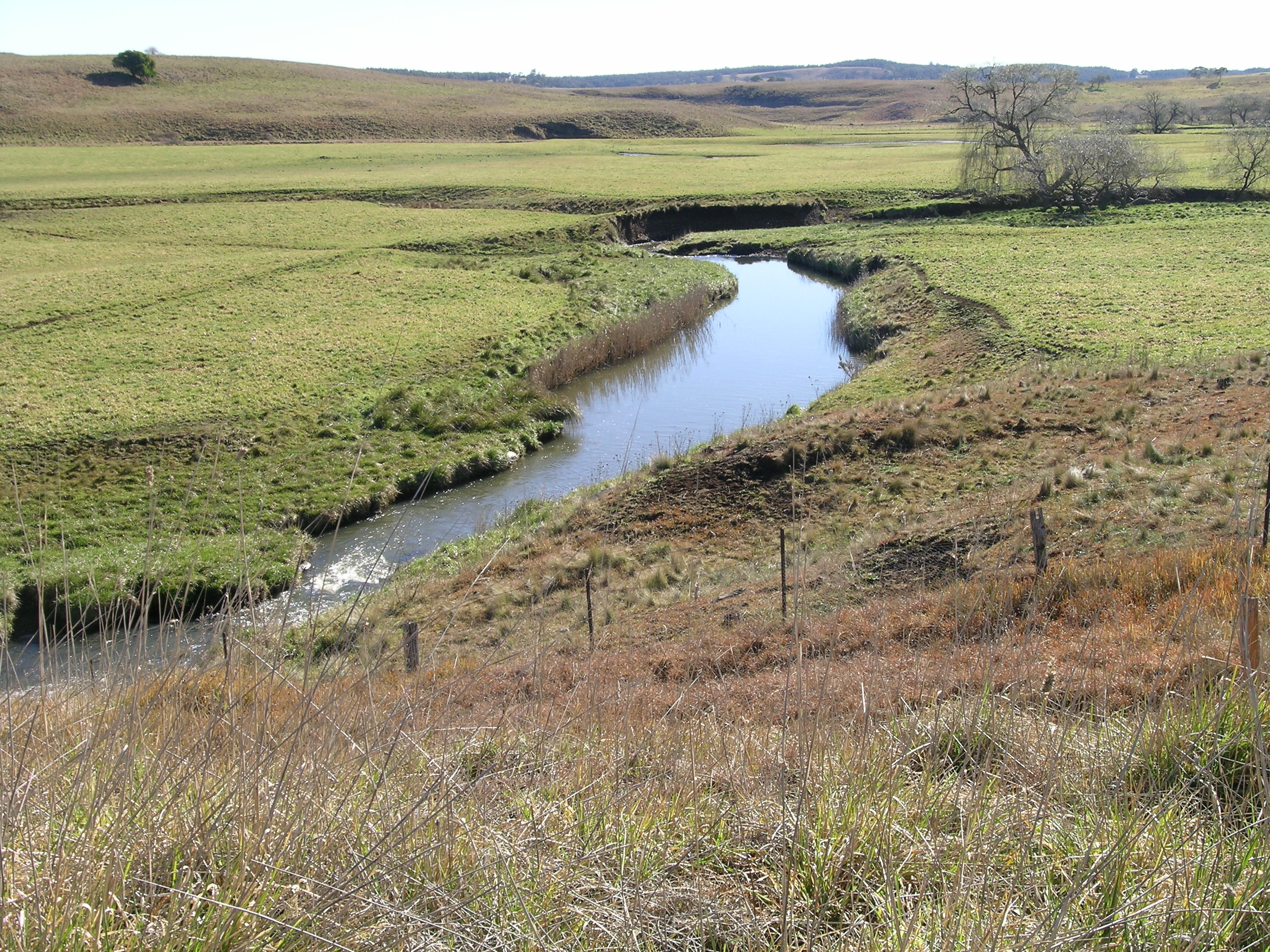
- Yarrowitch River near the Oxley Highway

Location
- Country: Australia
- State: New South Wales
- Region: New England Tablelands (IBRA), Northern Tablelands
- Local government area: Walcha

Physical characteristics
- Source: Great Dividing Range
  - location: near Yarrowitch
  - elevation: 1,100 m (3,600 ft)
- Mouth: confluence with the Apsley River
  - location: near Tia
  - elevation: 283 m (928 ft)
- Length: 62 km (39 mi)

Basin features
- River system: Macleay River catchment
- Tributaries
  - right: Warnes River
- National parks: Mummel Gulf NP, Oxley Wild Rivers NP

Yarrowitch River, a perennial stream of the Macleay River catchment, is located in the Northern Tablelands district of New South Wales, Australia.

== Course and features ==
Yarrowitch River rises within Mummel Gulf National Park on the northern slopes of the Great Dividing Range southwest of Yarrowitch, and flows generally north northeast, joined by the Warnes River before reaching its confluence with the Apsley River, southwest of Tia. The river descends 822 metres (2,697 ft) over its 62 kilometres (39 mi) course; spilling over the Yarrowitch Falls in the Oxley Wild Rivers National Park.

In its middle reaches, the Yarrowitch River passes through rich grazing country used for rearing livestock, principally beef cattle.

== See also ==
- List of rivers of Australia
- Rivers of New South Wales
