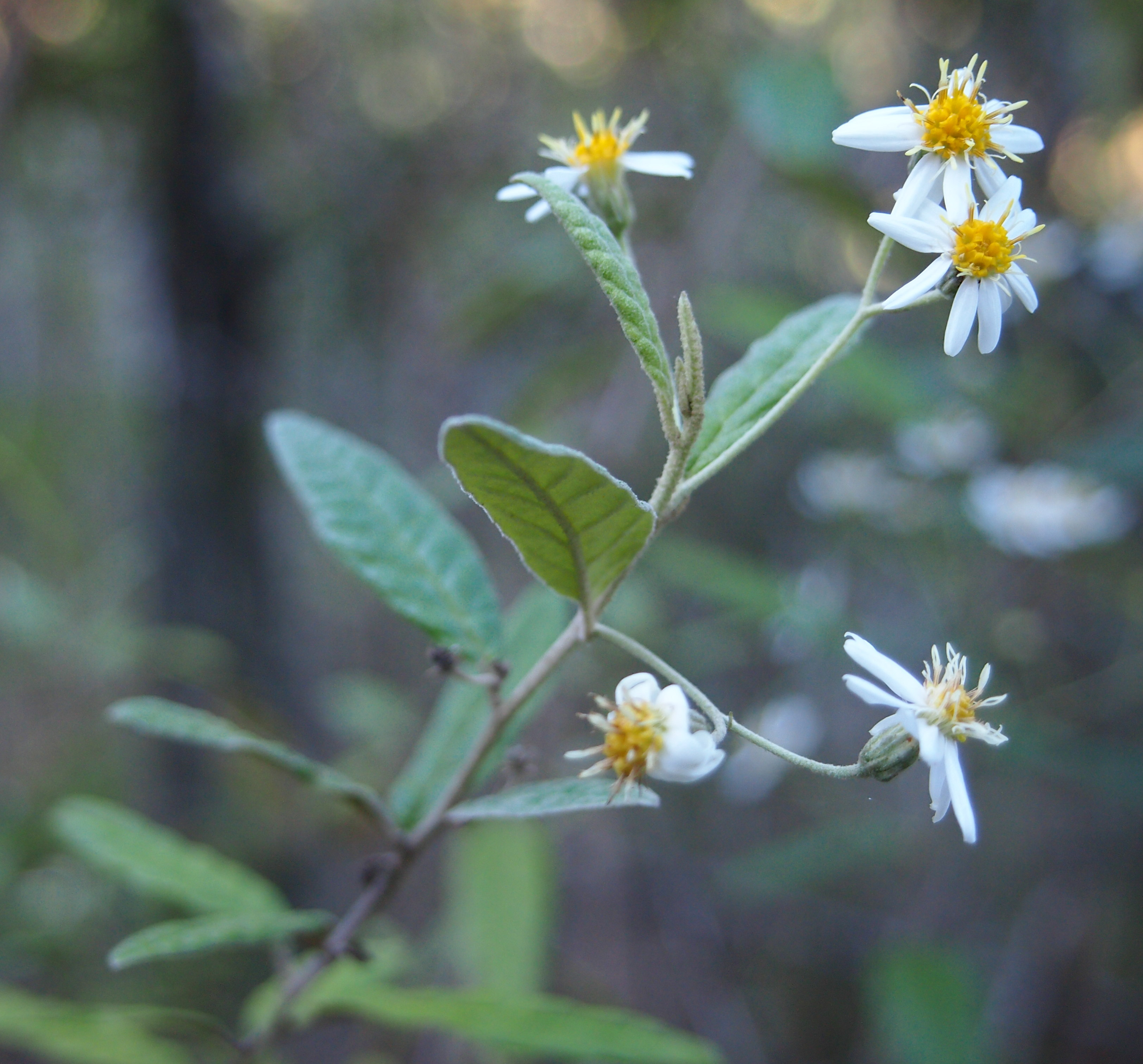
- Olearia canescens

Scientific classification
- Kingdom: Plantae
- Clade: Tracheophytes
- Clade: Angiosperms
- Clade: Eudicots
- Clade: Asterids
- Order: Asterales
- Family: Asteraceae
- Genus: Olearia
- Species: O. canescens

Binomial name
- Olearia canescens (Benth.) Hutch.

Synonyms
- Olearia stellulata f. canescens (Benth.) Siebert & Voss; Olearia stellulata var. canescens Benth.

= Olearia canescens =

Species of shrub

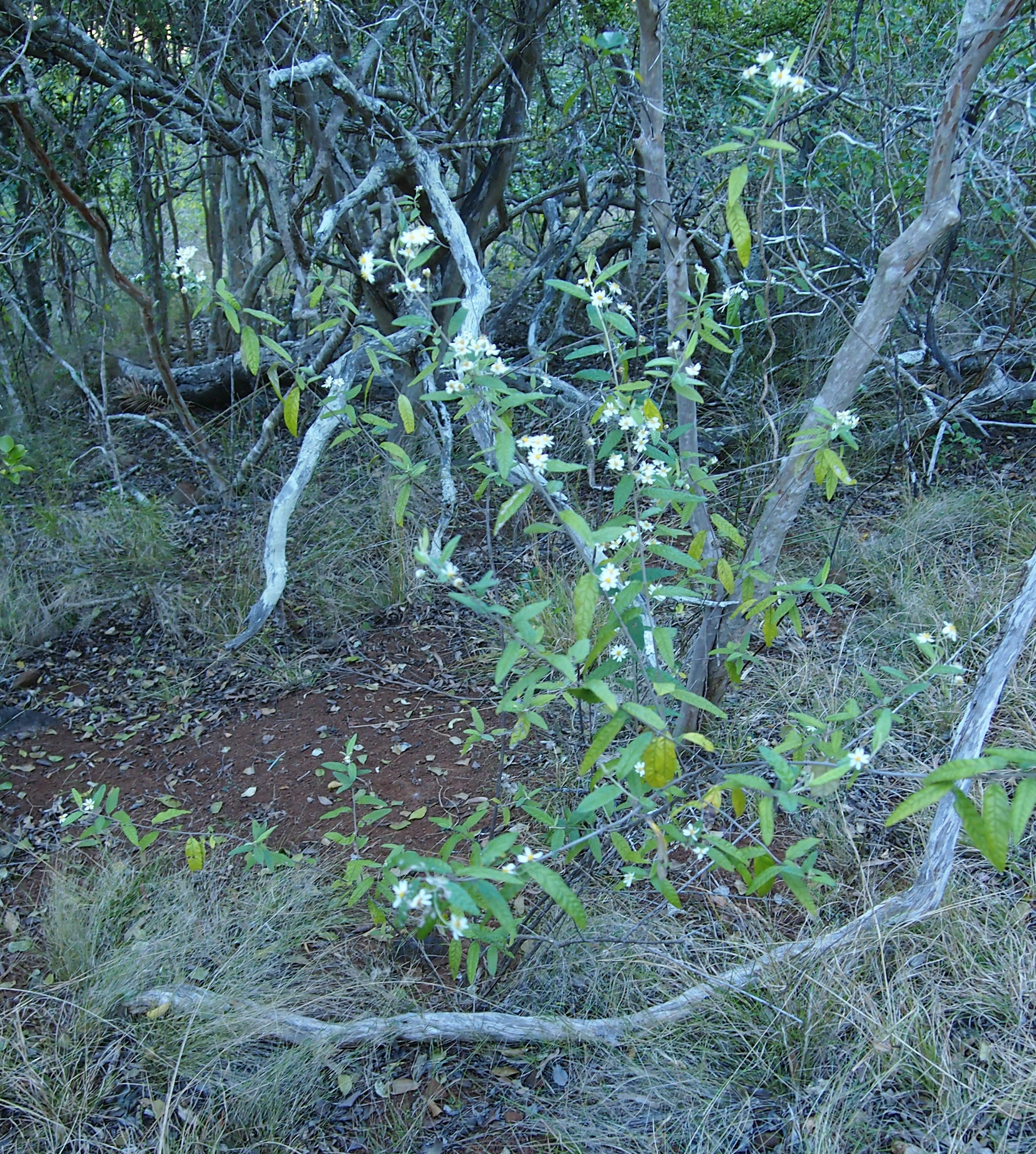
Habit

Olearia canescens is a species of flowering plant in the family Asteraceae and is endemic to eastern Australia. It is a shrub with scattered elliptic or egg-shaped leaves, and white and yellow, daisy-like inflorescences.

== Description ==
Olearia canescens is a shrub that typically grows to a height of up to 2 m (6 ft 7 in). It has scattered elliptic or egg-shaped leaves, 10–60 mm (0.39–2.36 in) long, 3–21 mm (0.12–0.83 in) wide and more or less sessile. Both surfaces of the leaves are covered with a layer of greyish, felt-like hairs. The heads or daisy-like "flowers" are arranged on the ends of branchlets and are 12–19 mm (0.47–0.75 in) in diameter on a peduncle up to 31 mm (1.2 in) long. Each head has eight to fifteen white ray florets surrounding seven to sixteen yellow disc florets. Flowering occurs from February to August and the fruit is a silky-hairy achene, the pappus with 35–43 long bristles in two rows with an outer row of shorter bristles.

== Taxonomy ==
This daisy bush was first formally described in 1867 by George Bentham who gave it the name Olearia stellulata var. canescens in Flora Australiensis. In 1917 John Hutchinson raised the variety to species status as O. canescens.

In 2014, Andre Messina described two subspecies in Australian Systematic Botany, and the names are accepted by the Australian Plant Census:

- Olearia canescens (Benth.) Hutch. subsp. canescens;
- Olearia canescens subsp. discolor Messina.

== Distribution and habitat ==
Olearia canescens grows in woodland, forest and rainforest in south-eastern Queensland and as far south as the Apsley River and west to the Nandewar Range in New South Wales.
