= Blue Spec =

Australian-bred Thoroughbred racehorse

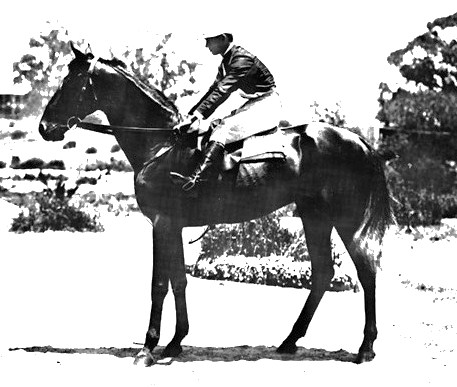
- Sire: True Blue (NZ)
- Dam: Specula
- Damsire: Splendor (GB)
- Sex: Stallion
- Foaled: 1899
- Country: Australia
- Colour: Brown
- Breeder: Augustus Hooke jnr.
- Owner: P.A. Connolly
- Trainer: Walter Hickenbotham

Major wins
- Perth Cup (1904); Melbourne Cup (1905); Kalgoorlie Cup (1904); Perth Stakes (1907); Moonee Valley Cup (1905)

Honours
- West Australian Racing Industry Hall of Fame
- Last updated on 4 September 2010

Blue Spec was an Australian Thoroughbred racehorse who established a new record in winning the Melbourne Cup in 1905. He was a brown stallion bred by Augustus Hooke, jnr. and foaled in 1899 at his Tia River Station, Tia, near Walcha, New South Wales.

== Pedigree ==
His sire, True Blue (NZ) was a good racehorse, winning the Carrington Stakes and the Waverley Handicap carrying 9 st 9 lb (61.3 kg) as a four-year-old. True Blue was purchased by Augustus Hooke in 1893 and sired 13 stakeswinners that won 19 principal races. Blue Spec's dam, Specula, was by Splendor (GB) who was a useful sire. Kennaquhair (won Sydney Cup and AJC Metropolitan Handicap etc.) and Eric were from the same family and closely related to Blue Spec.

== Racing record ==
Blue Spec was sold in Sydney during 1903 for 155 guineas to P.A. Connolly of Western Australia. He was then taken to Western Australia where he won the Kalgoorlie Cup and Perth Cup, the two most important races in that state. Blue Spec had carried Connolly's red and white colours to the start of an amazing five consecutive and two later wins in the Perth Cup, with different horses, for his owner.

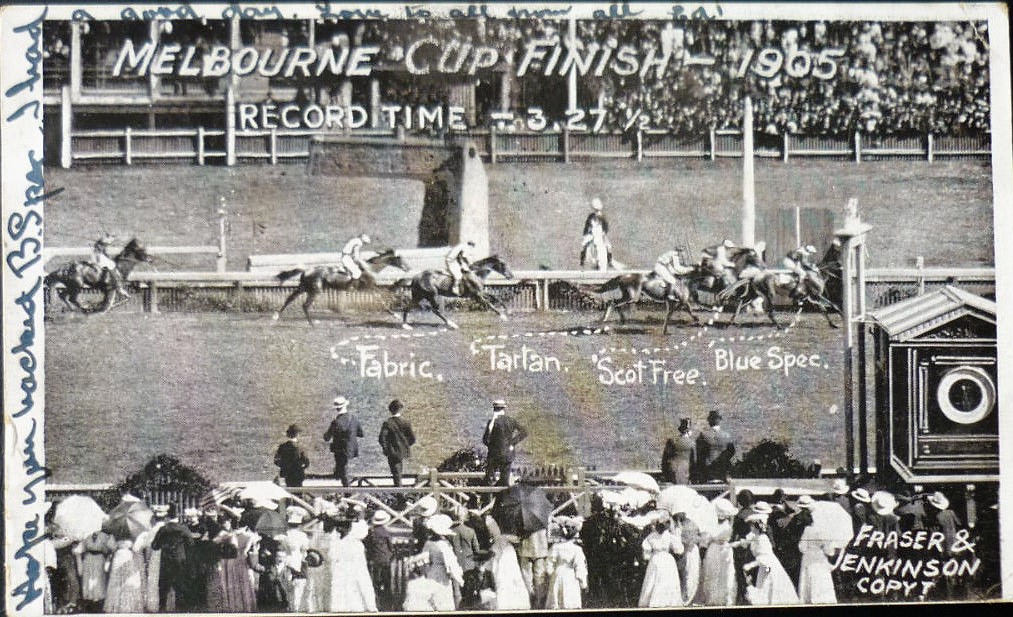
Finish of the 1905 Melbourne Cup

The Melbourne Cup was the next target and Blue Spec was taken to trainer, Walter Hickenbotham's stables in Victoria in 1904 with this in mind. From this base he won the 1905 Moonee Valley Cup and then the 1905 Melbourne Cup in the record time of 3:27½. Blue Spec's victory in the Melbourne Cup was the trainer's fourth success in this important race.

== Stud record ==
At stud Blue Spec sired two stakes winners, Blue Rain (WATC Easter Handicap) and Semi Blue (WATC Osborne Stakes) as well as other winners.

Blue Spec was inducted into the West Australian Racing Industry Hall of Fame.
