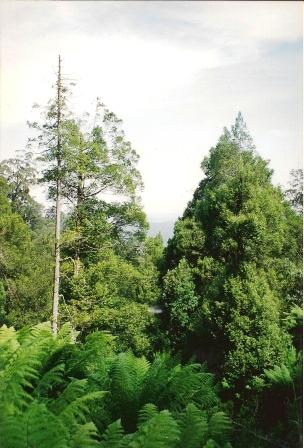
- Near Orbost, Victoria

Conservation status
- Least Concern (IUCN 3.1)

Scientific classification
- Kingdom: Plantae
- Clade: Tracheophytes
- Clade: Angiosperms
- Clade: Magnoliids
- Order: Laurales
- Family: Atherospermataceae
- Genus: Atherosperma; Labill.
- Species: A. moschatum

Binomial name
- Atherosperma moschatum Labill.

Subspecies
- A. moschatum subsp. moschatum; A. moschatum subsp. integrifolium (A.Cunn. ex Tul.) Schodde

Synonyms
- synonyms of subsp. integrifolium: Atherosperma elongatum Gand.; Atherosperma integrifolium A.Cunn. ex A.DC.; Atherosperma moschatum integrifolium A.Cunn. ex Tul.; synonyms of subsp. moschatum: Atherosperma dilatatum Gand.; Atherosperma muticum Gand.; Atherosperma tasmanicum Gand.

= Atherosperma =

Species of tree

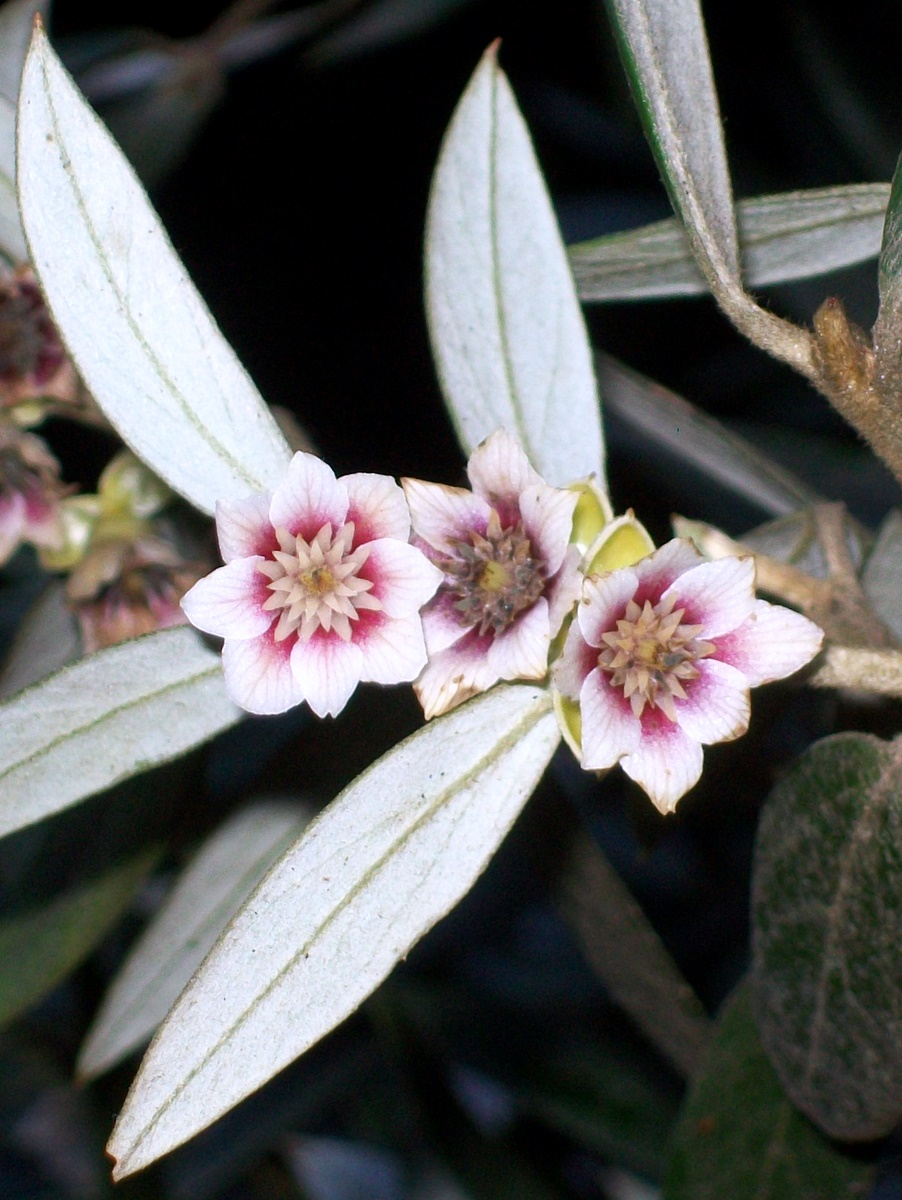
Flowers at Leura

Atherosperma is a genus of flowering plant in the family Atherospermataceae. Its only species is Atherosperma moschatum, commonly known as black sassafras, Australian sassafras, southern sassafras, native sassafras or Tasmanian sassafras. It is a shrub to conical tree and is endemic to south-eastern Australia. It has densely hairy young branchlets, flowers and the lower surface of the leaves. Its leaves are lance-shaped to elliptic, sometimes with toothed edges, the flowers perfumed and white to cream, and the fruit is an achene.

== Description ==
Atherosperma moschatum is a shrub to conical tree that typically grows to a height of 2 to 30 metres (7 to 100 feet). Its young branchlets, flowers and the lower surface of the leaves are usually densely hairy. Its leaves are nutmeg-scented when crushed, lance-shaped, sometimes with the narrower end towards the base, or elliptic, 30–95 mm (1.2–3.7 in) long and 8–23 mm (0.3–0.9 in) wide on a petiole 2–6 mm (0.08–0.2 in) long. The upper surface of the leaves is glossy green and the edges are sometimes irregularly toothed.

The flowers are pleasantly perfumed with cream-coloured to white tepals, 6–10 mm (0.2–0.4 in) long and often streaked with purple. The receptacle is 10–12 mm (0.4–0.5 in) long and densely hairy. Flowering occurs from July to October, and the fruit is a densely hairy achene 10–20 mm (0.4–0.8 in) long.

== Taxonomy ==
Atherosperma moschatum was first formally described in 1806 by French naturalist Jacques Labillardière in his Novae Hollandiae Plantarum Specimen. The generic name (Atherosperma) is derived from the Ancient Greek ather meaning "awn", and sperma meaning "seed", referring to the hairs on the fruit. The specific epithet moschatum is the Latin adjective meaning "musk-scented", from the smell of the bark. It is a member of the small family Atherospermataceae along with several other Australian rainforest trees including yellow sassafras (Doryphora sassafras). . Its closest relative is the monotypic genus Nemuaron, endemic to New Caledonia.

In 1855, Edmond Tulasne described Atherosperma integrifolium in the Archives du Muséum d'Histoire Naturelle, Paris from an unpublished description by Allan Cunningham. In 2007, Richard Schodde reduced this species to a subspecies of Atherosperma moschatum in the Flora of Australia, and its name, and that of the autonym are accepted by the Australian Plant Census and Plants of the World Online:

- Atherosperma moschatum Labill. subsp. moschatum (the autonym) is a small to medium-sized tree that typically grows to a height of 4–30 m (13–98 ft) and has lance-shaped leaves, sometimes with the narrower end towards the base, or sometimes elliptic, the edges usually toothed.
- Atherosperma moschatum subsp. integrifolium (A.Cunn. ex Tul.) Schodde is a slender shrub or small tree that typically grows to a height of 2–10 m (6 ft 7 in – 32 ft 10 in) and has mostly lance-shaped leaves with entire margins, sometimes toothed in juveniles.

== Distribution and habitat ==
Black sassafras grows along streams in deep gullies at higher altitudes and occurs at Barrington Tops, in the upper Blue Mountains and Tia Gorge in New South Wales, in cool-temperate rainforest in eastern Victoria and eastern Tasmania. It often grows with Nothofagus cunninghamii and Elaeocarpus holopetalus. Subspecies integrifolium is restricted to cool-temperate rainforest in the Barrington Tops and Blue Mountains.

== Ecology ==
The smooth-barked A. moschatum does not shed its bark annually, and is a rich host of lichen species. A field study in Errinundra National Park found a total of 54 lichen species present, with 11 species found on trees of all sizes measured. The most commonly recorded was Pannaria microphyllizans. These pockets of rainforest are thought to be critical refuges for populations of lichen species among fire-prone eucalyptus woodland.

== Use in horticulture ==
It requires moisture and shade for cultivation, hence is not commonly seen cultivated.

It has been planted in the British Isles as far north as Northern Ireland and Scotland.

The leaves have a distinct scent and may be chewed to release a flavour and tingling sensation. However, the safety of the plants' consumption is not known and it may be poisonous.

== See also ==
- Sassafras, Tasmania, a small town in North West Tasmania named after the local growth of southern sassafras.
