= Warnes River =

River in New South Wales, Australia

Coordinates: 31°14′S 152°05′E

Location
- Country: Australia
- State: New South Wales
- IBRA: New England Tablelands
- District: Northern Tablelands
- Local government area: Walcha

Physical characteristics
- Source: Mount Werrikimbe, Great Dividing Range
  - location: near Red Hill
  - elevation: 1,010 m (3,310 ft)
- Mouth: confluence with the Yarrowitch River
  - location: near Yarrowitch
  - elevation: 437 m (1,434 ft)
- Length: 23 km (14 mi)

Basin features
- River system: Macleay River catchment

Warnes River, a perennial stream of the Macleay River catchment, is located in the Northern Tablelands district of New South Wales, Australia.

== Course and features ==
Warnes River rises below Mount Werrikimbe, on the eastern slopes of the Great Dividing Range south of Red Hill, and flows generally west northwest then north within Oxley Wild Rivers National Park before reaching its confluence with the Yarrowitch River, northeast of Yarrowitch, descending 577 metres (1,893 ft) over its 23 kilometres (14 mi) course.

== See also ==
- List of rivers of Australia
- Rivers of New South Wales
