= Kennaquhair (horse) =

Australian-bred Thoroughbred racehorse

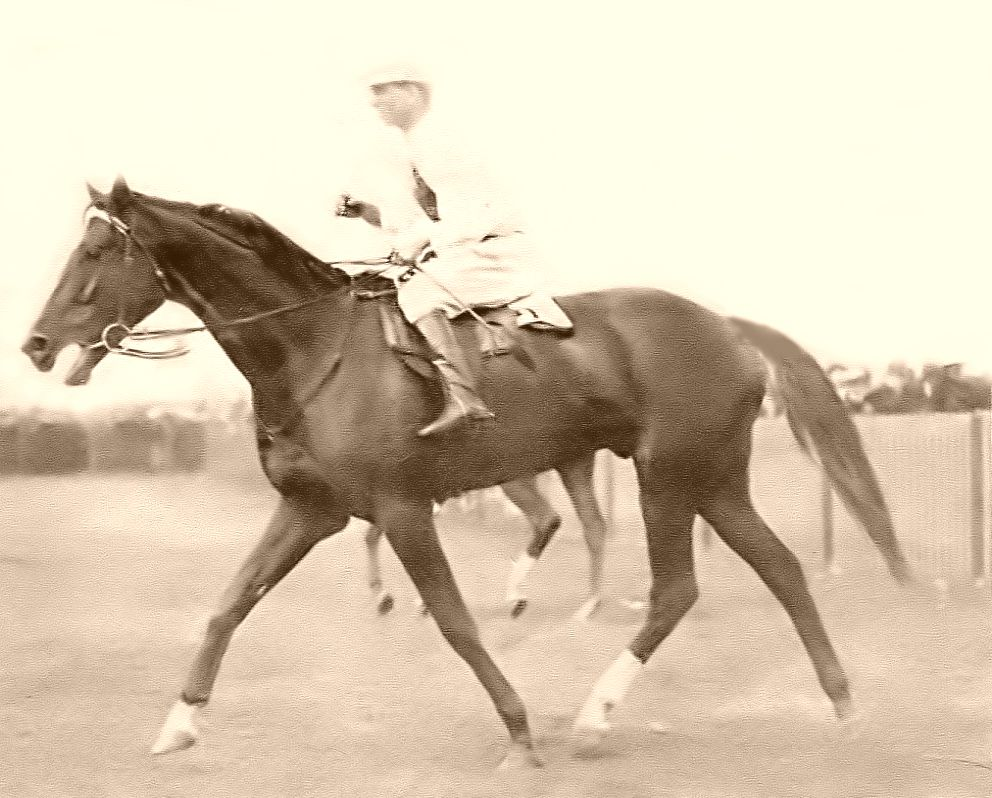
- Sire: Kenilworth (FR)
- Dam: Calluna
- Damsire: Manton (NZ)
- Sex: Stallion
- Foaled: 1914
- Country: Australia
- Colour: Chestnut
- Owner: W.M. “Will” Borthwick & J. Laycock
- Trainer: Bill Stringer
- Record: 72 starts: 10 wins, plus many placings
- Earnings: £17,126

Major wins
- AJC Metropolitan Handicap (1918); C.B. Fisher Plate (1918); Sydney Cup (1920); AJC Spring Stakes (1920)
- Last updated on 26 February 2010

Kennaquhair was an Australian bred Thoroughbred racehorse that won the Sydney Cup (in record time), and the AJC Metropolitan Handicap as well as finishing second in the 1918 Melbourne Cup.

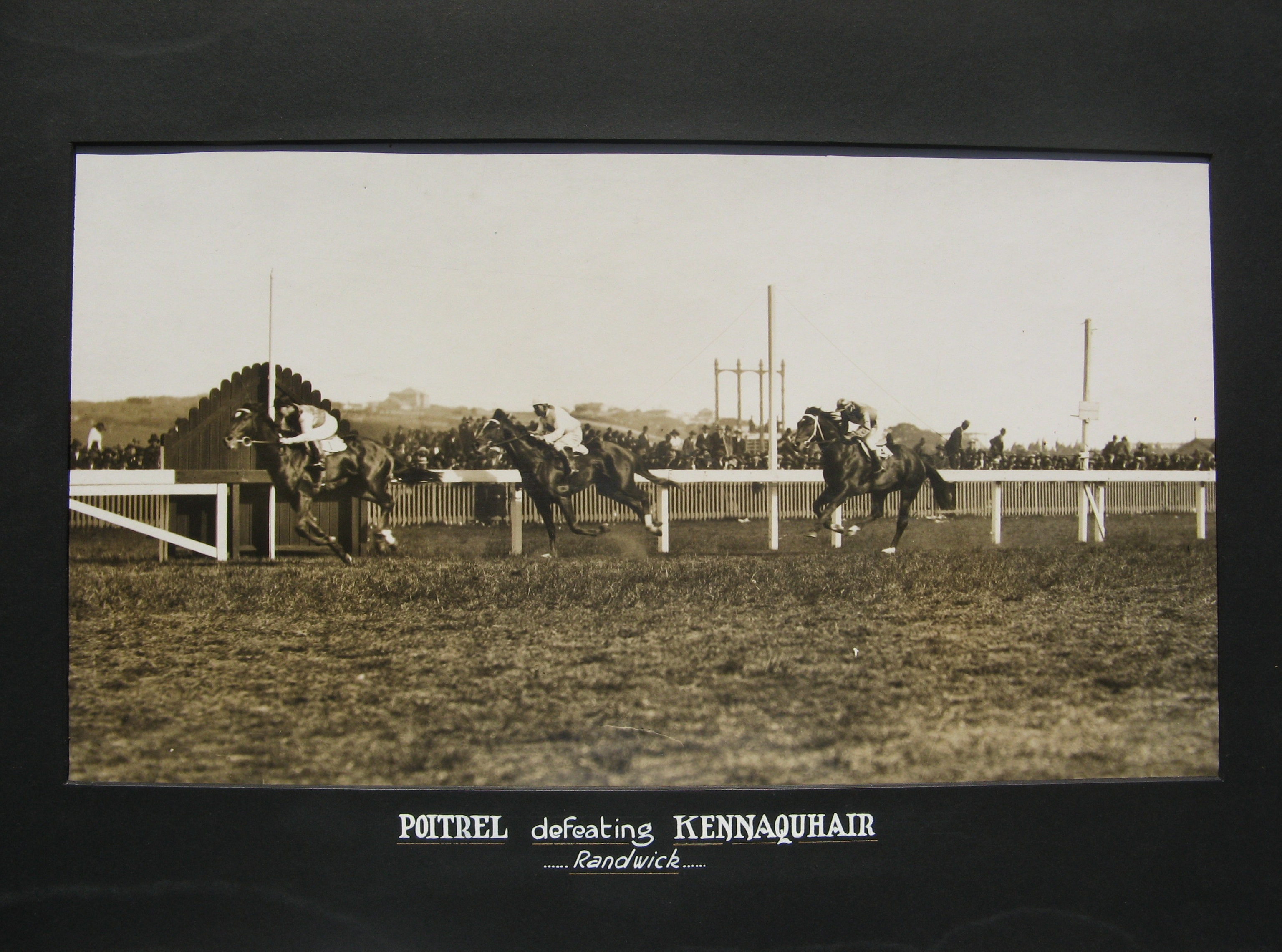
Kennaquhair finishing second to Poitrel in the AJC Randwick Plate

== Pedigree ==
He was an attractive chestnut stallion, foaled in 1914, by Ksar’s half-brother, Kenilworth (FR), his dam Calluna was by Manton (NZ). Kenilworth won the Prix Greffulhe, Prix Rainbow and the marathon four miles (6,400 metres) race, Prix Gladiateur before being exported to Australia. In Australia Kenilworth was the sire of 15 stakes winners that won 36 stakes races, including Wolaroi, which had 12 stakes wins. Kennaquhair was a brother to Kenaluna, dam of Red Thespian (NJC Cameron Handicap). They were closely related to Blue Spec and Eric, won the AJC Metropolitan Handicap etc.

== Racing record ==
Kennaquhair was trained at Walcha, New South Wales by Bill Stringer, who had a team of up to 40 horses at his stables in the town.

=== At four years: 1918-1919 ===
Principal race wins:

- AJC Anniversary Handicap (now named the AJC Australia Day Cup) 12 furlongs (2,400 metres)
- AJC Metropolitan Handicap 12 furlongs (2,400 metres)
- VRC C.B. Fisher Plate (now the VRC Queen Elizabeth Stakes) 12 furlongs.

Kennaquhair carried nine stone (57 kilograms) in the Melbourne Cup to finish second to Night March carrying six stone nine pounds (4.1 kg). During the running Kennaquhair clipped the heels of another runner, Desert Gold, which interrupted his run. The race set a new Cup record time of 3 minutes 25¾ seconds and the winner won by the short margin of half a length.

He then finished second to Poitrel in the AJC Autumn Stakes, 12 furlongs; AJC Cumberland Stakes, 16 furlongs (3,200 m) and AJC Plate (AJC Queen Elizabeth Stakes) 24 furlongs (approx 4,800 m).

He finished third to Gloaming in the Sydney City Tatt's Chelmsford Stakes over 9 furlongs (1,800 m). He was then placed third to Poitrel in the AJC Spring Stakes, (now Colin Stephen Quality Handicap) of 12 furlongs.

=== At five years: 1919–1920 ===
Principal race wins:

- AJC Sydney Cup 16 furlongs carrying 9 stone 5 pounds (59 kg) in the Australasian record time of 3 minutes 22¾ seconds.
- City Tattersall's Cup (now City Tatt's City Tattersalls Club Cup) 11 furlongs (2,200 m).

Kennaquhair finished second to Poitrel in the AJC Randwick Plate at WFA, 2 miles (approx. 3,200 m) and second yet again to Poitrel in the AJC Plate at Weight for Age (WFA), over three miles (approx. 5,400 m).

He also finished third, both times to Poitrel, in the AJC Autumn Stakes, 12F and AJC Cumberland Stakes at WFA over two miles.

Kennaquhair was allotted the top weight of 9 stone 5 pounds (59 kg) in the 1919 Melbourne Cup, but was unplaced.

=== At six years: 1920-1921 ===
Principal race win:

- Dead-heated with Poitrel for a win in the AJC Spring Stakes, (now Colin Stephen Quality Handicap) 12 furlongs

Kennaquhair finished second to Poitrel in the AJC Randwick Plate (WFA, 2 miles).

When he was six years old Kennaquhair had his portrait painted by the noted equine artist, Martin Stainforth.

In 1921 Kennaquhair starred as the heroine's horse, Alert in the silent, black and white film, Silks and Saddles. This film was released overseas as Queen of the Turf.

== Stud record ==
He retired to the Mungie Bundie Stud, near Moree, New South Wales in 1922. He remained there until the stud was dispersed and he then stood at Walcha. Kennaquhair did sire some country winners, but no stakes winners or any broodmares of note.

He died at Bective Station, Tamworth, New South Wales in 1934.
