= Apsley River (New South Wales) =

River in Australia

Coordinates: 31°01′09″S 151°43′52″E

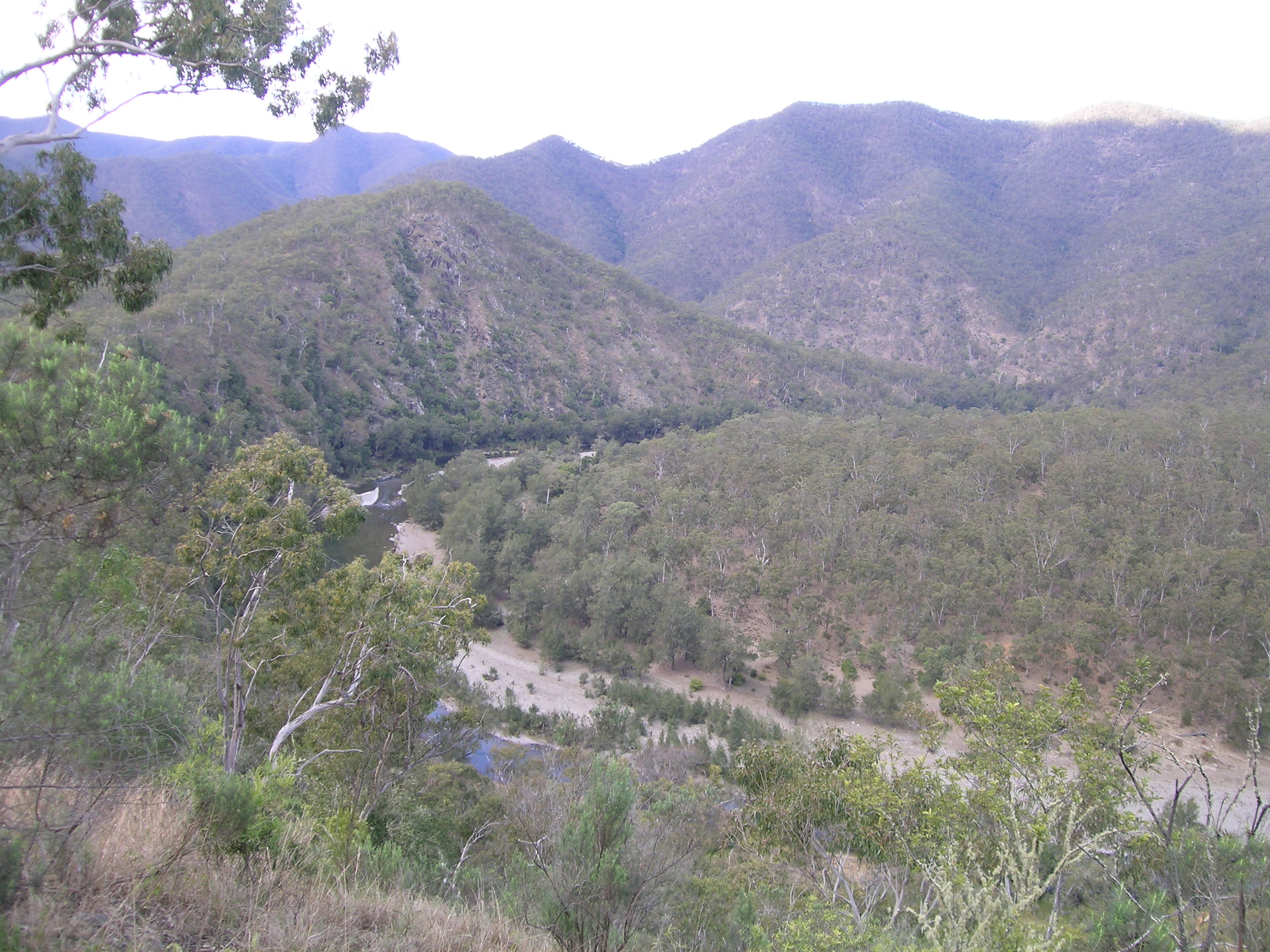
- Apsley River in Oxley Wild Rivers National Park

- Location of mouth
- Etymology: In honour of The Lord Apsley, Secretary of State for Colonies

Location
- Country: Australia
- State: New South Wales
- IBRA: New England Tablelands
- District: Northern Tablelands
- Local government area: Walcha

Physical characteristics
- Source: Tia Range, Great Dividing Range
  - location: west of Tia
  - elevation: 1,260 m (4,130 ft)
- Mouth: confluence with the Macleay River
  - location: southwest the locality of Lower Creek
  - elevation: 190 m (620 ft)
- Length: 168 km (104 mi)

Basin features
- River system: Macleay River catchment
- Tributaries
  - left: Ohio Creek, Emu Creek (New South Wales), Rowleys Creek, Reedy Creek (New South Wales)
  - right: Double Hut Creek, Tia River, Yarrowitch River
- Waterfalls: Apsley Falls
- National park: Oxley Wild Rivers NP

Apsley River, a perennial stream of the Macleay River catchment, is located in the Northern Tablelands district of New South Wales, Australia.

== Course and features ==
Apsley River rises in the high country of the Tia Range, part of the Great Dividing Range, approximately 11 kilometres (6.8 mi) west of the locality of Tia and approximately 29 kilometres (18 mi) south of Walcha. The river flows generally north through the town of Walcha and on to make a dramatic spilling over the Apsley Falls, descending approximately 27 metres (89 ft) into the Apsley Gorge, towards its confluence with the Macleay River, approximately 24 kilometres (15 mi) southwest of the locality of Lower Creek. The Apsley River is joined by seven tributaries, including the Tia River and Yarrowitch River, as it makes its course, descending 1,070 metres (3,510 ft) over 168 kilometres (104 mi).

Together with the Macleay River, the Apsley River has developed deeply incised river valleys into Ordovician meta-sedimentary rocks including greywacke, slate, phyllite, schist, chert and argillites. This has produced a number of spectacular gorges and waterfalls on or near the Apsley River in the Oxley Wild Rivers National Park.

The Apsley Macleay Gorges are a converging point for moister eastern coastal and dry western floras, and some 950 native plant species have been identified, of which 36 are rare or threatened. The gorge wattle is a rare species that mainly grows in the Apsley-Macleay gorges. Epiphytic orchids may also be observed growing in trees.

The entire length of the Apsley River is within the boundaries of Walcha Shire and Vernon County.

Dingos, brumbies, carpet pythons, goannas and feral pigs inhabit parts of the warmer, lower reaches of the Apsley River.

== History ==
The traditional custodians of the land surrounding the Apsley River are the Aboriginal people of the Ngayaywana and Dyangadi nations. Archaeological evidence of Aboriginal camp sites have been found on the upper terraces of the Apsley and Macleay Rivers.

In 1818 explorer, John Oxley, camped beside the Apsley River very near the present townsite en route to the coast. A cairn now marks his campsite alongside the Apsley River, which Oxley named after Lord Apsley, Secretary of State for Colonies. He recorded the event in his diary that day:

"We halted in a fine and spacious valley ... watered by a fine brook, and at a distance of a mile we saw several fires at which appeared many natives."

Australian red cedar (Toona ciliata) cutters were active in the area's rainforests before 1860. Some red cedar trees may still be seen in the more remote tributaries of the river.

The deep "Mill Hole" in the Apsley River, above the Fitzroy Street bridge, was used as the local swimming hole until the Walcha and District War Memorial Baths were completed in October 1970.

In 1981 the Electricity Commission of New South Wales (Elcom) proposed to build a large pumped storage scheme on the Apsley River to supply electricity for peak energy demand periods. During late 1981 Elcom improved the Cicolini Trail to the Apsley River and installed a river gauging station. The project was shelved following a land use study recommending a major national park be established. In 1986 the park was gazetted to foster nature conservation, cultural heritage and tourism on the Northern Tablelands.

The Lower Apsley River Landcare Group was formed in 1993 to improve the health of the riparian zone of the Apsley River. This landcare group encompasses an area of approximately 300 square kilometres (120 sq mi) between Walcha and the Oxley Wild Rivers National Park. Since its establishment, the group has planted 320,000 trees across 140 sites, most of which were thriving as at 2008.

In 2007, the old single lane wooden bridge over the Apsley River in Walcha was replaced with the two-lane bridge, with a pedestrian pathway, located on Middle Street.

== Flooding ==
The Apsley River flooded Walcha in 1893, 1935, 1941 and 1952. The maximum period between floods up to 1962 was ten years. Walcha's worst flood was on 12 January 1962, when 40 business houses and 39 residences were flooded. Losses were in the vicinity of A$250,000. A public appeal raised A$11,000 and the Armidale Lord Mayor's fund gave £8,650. It cost the Walcha Shire $2,000 to clean up the town, however the amount of work carried out by volunteers would have doubled this figure.

In September 1967 Walcha Council decided to proceed with flood mitigation, provided it did not exceed $140,000. By September 1971, all required land had been resumed to give the council full control for flood mitigation purposes. The scheme was almost complete by October 1973 and the flood warning system on "Somerset" became redundant. Since the construction of the levee banks there has been no further flooding of the township.

The Apsley River flooded on 28 November 2008, causing major damage to farming properties and livestock losses. The levee banks saved Walcha township from flooding.

== See also ==
- Apsley Falls
- List of rivers in New South Wales (A-K)

== Gallery ==
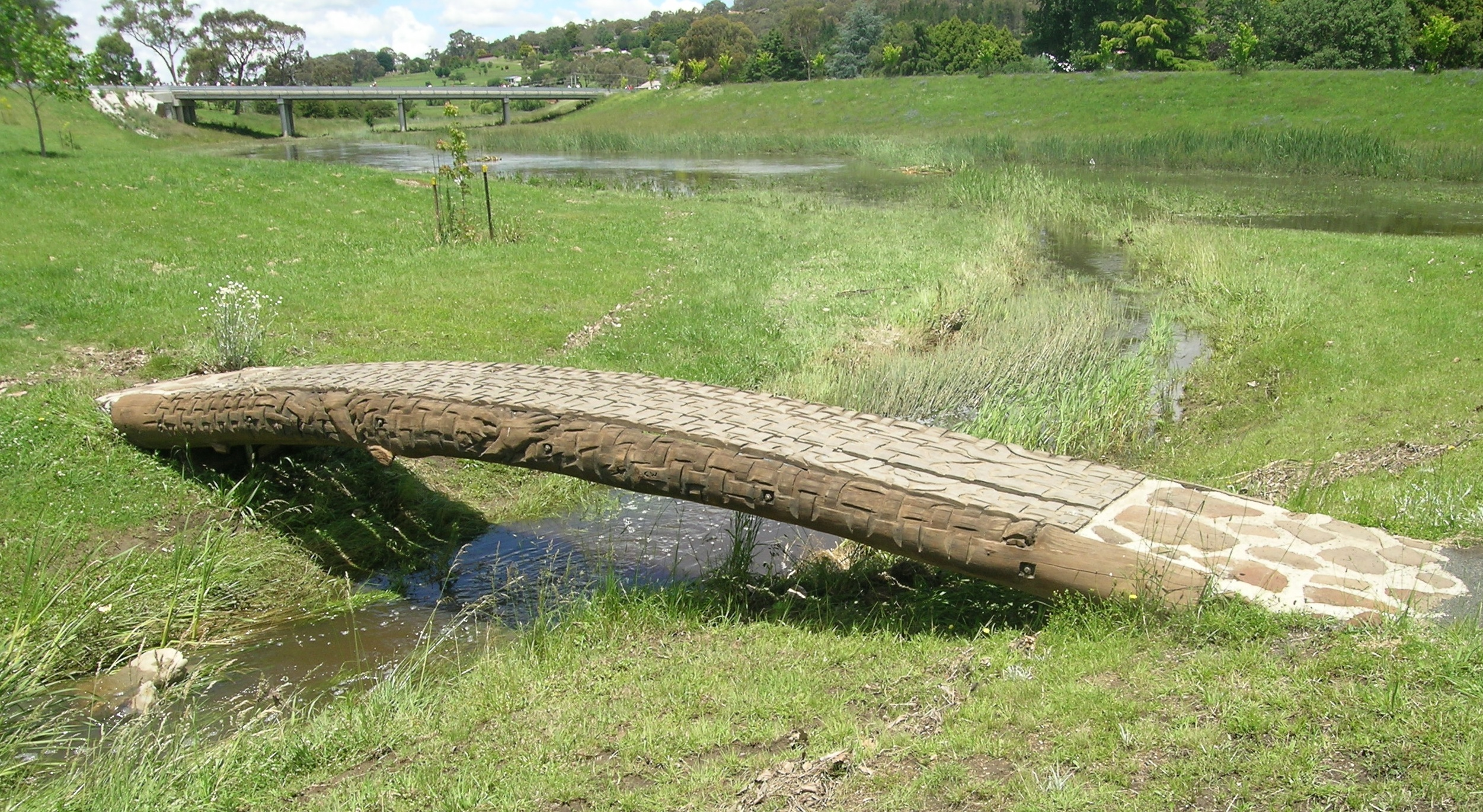
Levee banks and the Middle Street bridge over the Apsley River, Walcha.

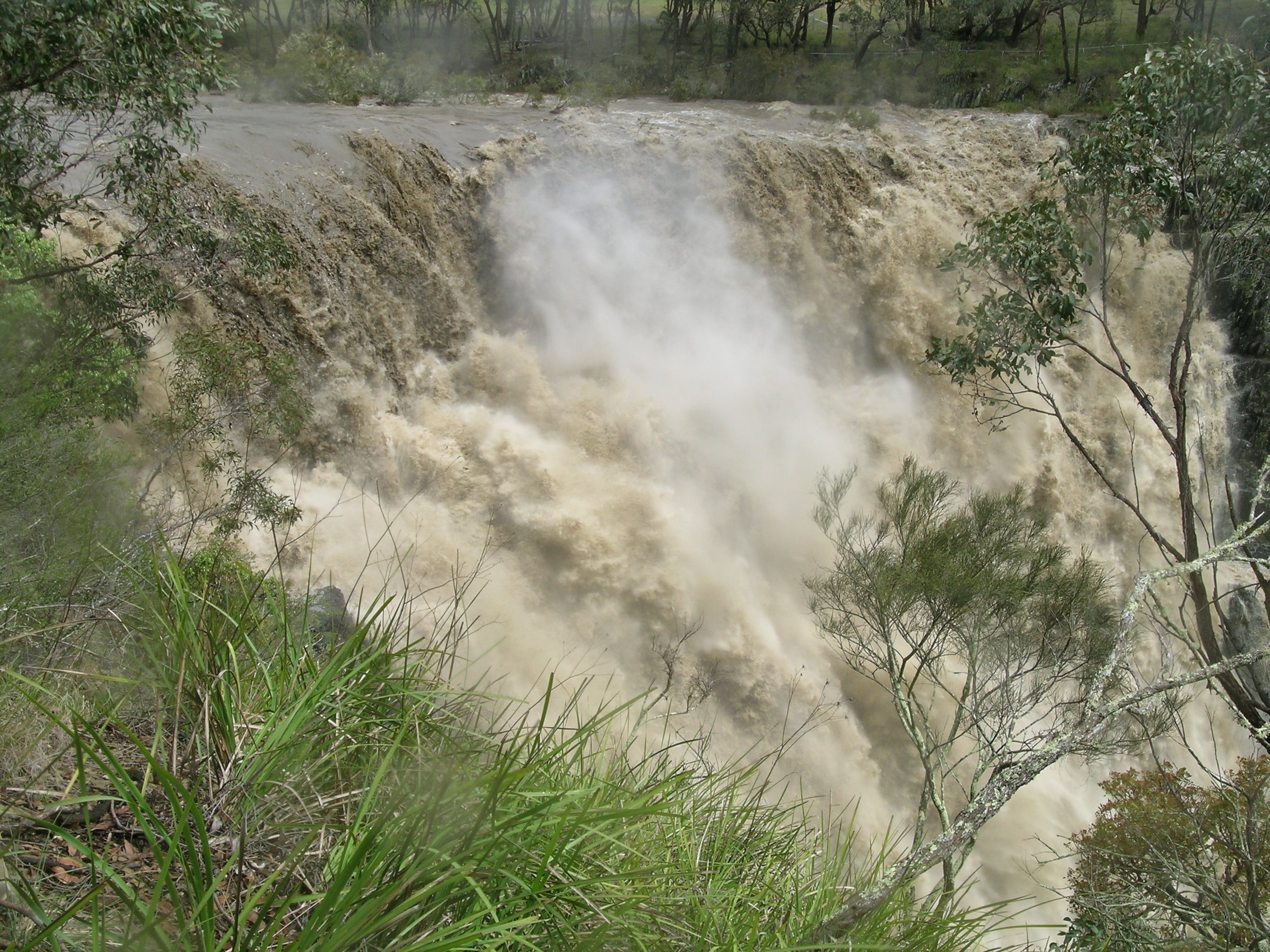
Apsley Falls during a flood.
