= Perth Cup =

Annual horse race in Perth, Western Australia

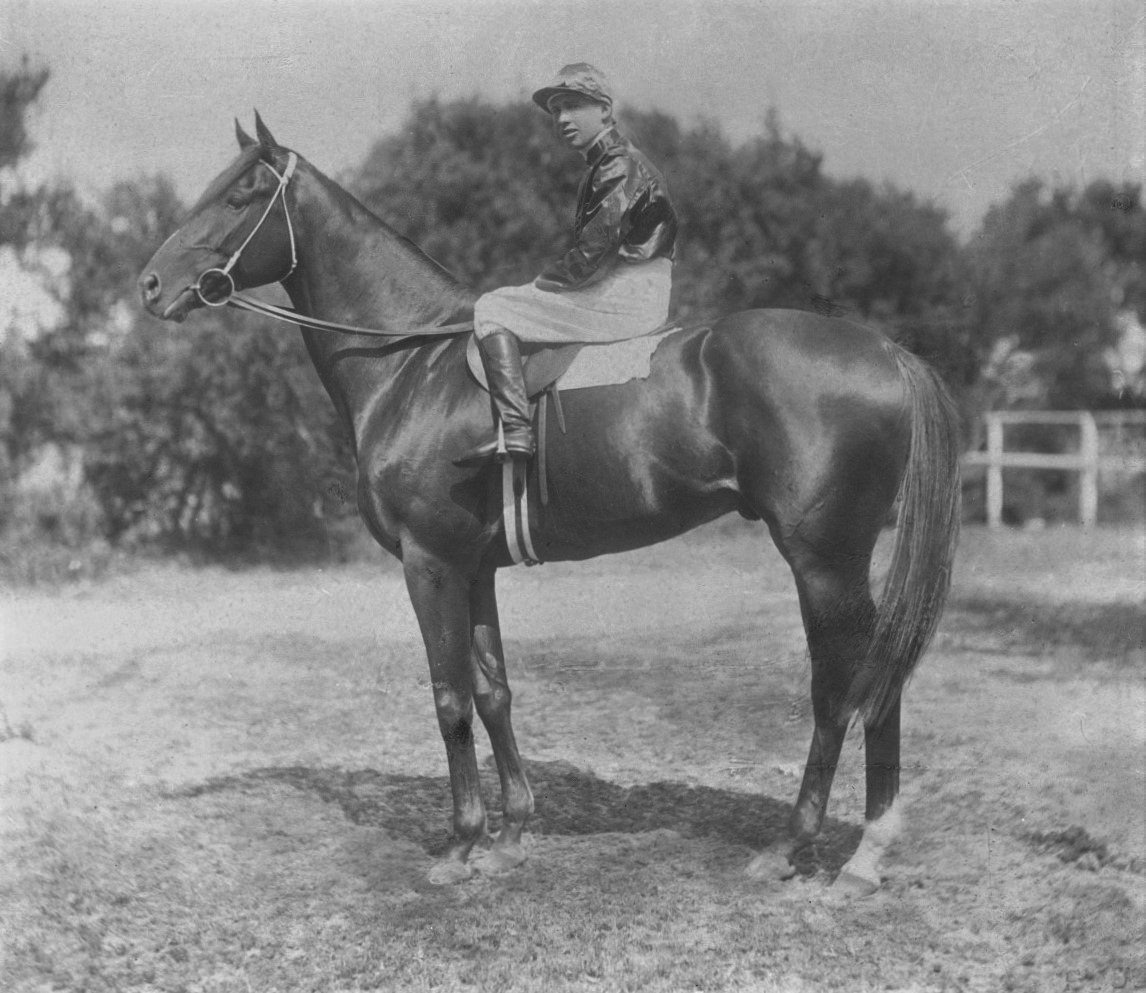
- Eurythmic, 1919 winner
- Class: Group 2
- Location: Ascot Racecourse
- Inaugurated: 1887
- Race type: Thoroughbred
- Sponsor: TABTouch (2026)

Race information
- Distance: 2,400 metres
- Surface: Turf
- Track: Left-handed
- Qualification: Three year olds and older
- Weight: Quality handicap
- Purse: A$1,000,000 (2026)

The Perth Cup is a Perth Racing Group 2 Thoroughbred horse race run under quality handicap conditions over a distance of 2,400 metres (1.5 mi) at Ascot Racecourse in Perth, Western Australia in January, usually on New Year's Day. The total prize money is $1,000,000.

== History ==
=== Distance ===
- 1887–1946 - Two miles (~3,219 metres)
- 1947–1961 - Two miles and 11 yards (~3,230 metres)
- 1962–1972 - Two miles (~3,219 metres)
- 1972–2008 - 3,200 metres
- 2009 onwards - 2,400 metres

=== Grade ===
- 1887–1978 - Principal race
- 1979–1992 - Group 1
- 1993 onwards - Group 2

=== Records ===
Mr. P.A. Connolly had five consecutive and two later wins in the Perth Cup, with Blue Spec (in 1904), Czarowitch (1905), May King (1906), Post Town (1907), Scorcher (1908), Jolly Beggar (1910) and Jolly Cosy (a son of Jolly Beggar) in 1922.

== Winners ==
- 2026 - Apulia
- 2025 - Hemlock Stone
- 2024 - Casino Seventeen
- 2023 - Buster Bash
- 2022 - Midnight Blue
- 2021 - Neufbosc
- 2020 - Mississippi Delta
- 2019 - Star Exhibit
- 2018 - Material Man
- 2016 (Dec. 31) - Star Exhibit
- 2016 (Jan. 2) - Delicacy
- 2015 - Real Love
- 2014 - Black Tycoon
- 2013 - Talent Show
- 2011 (Dec. 31) - Western Jewel
- 2011 (Jan. 1) - Guest Wing
- 2010 - Lords Ransom
- 2009 - Guyno
- 2008 - Cats Fun
- 2007 - Respect
- 2006 - Black Tom
- 2005 - Crown Prosecutor
- 2004 - King Canute
- 2003 - Tumeric
- 2002 - Cardinal Colours
- 2001 - Lottila Bay
- 2000 - Luna Tudor
- 1999 - King Of Saxony
- 1998 - Heed The Toll
- 1997 - Time Frame
- 1996 - Crying Game
- 1995 - Ros Reef
- 1994 - Palatious
- 1993 - Field Officer
- 1992 - Mirror Magic
- 1991 - Zamlight
- 1990 - Word Of Honour
- 1989 - Saratov
- 1988 - Linc The Leopard
- 1987 - Rocket Racer
- 1986 - Ullyatt
- 1985 - Phizam
- 1984 - Moss Kingdom
- 1983 - Bianco Lady
- 1982 - Magistrate
- 1981 - Magistrate
- 1980 - Rothschild
- 1979 - Meliador
- 1978 - Golden Centre
- 1977 - Muros
- 1976 - Philomel
- 1975 - Runyon
- 1974 - Allegation
- 1973 - Dayana
- 1972 - Fait Accompli
- 1971 - Artello Bay
- 1970 - Fait Accompli
- 1969 - Jenark
- 1968 - Lintonmarc
- 1967 - Special Reward
- 1966 - Royal Coral
- 1965 - Fair's Print
- 1964 - Resolution
- 1963 - Bay Count
- 1962 - Royal Khora
- 1961 - England's Dust
- 1960 - Rendition
- 1959 - Fairetha
- 1958 - Fairetha
- 1957 - Elmsfield
- 1955 - Yabaroo
- 1955 - Lenarc
- 1954 - Beau Scot
- 1953 - Raconteur
- 1952 - Avarna
- 1950 - Azennis
- 1949 - Beau Vasse
- 1949 - Gurkha
- 1948 - Kingscote
- 1947 - Sydney James
- 1946 - Maddington
- 1945 - Gay Parade
- 1944 - Loyalist
- 1942 - Ragtime
- 1942 - Temple Chief
- 1941 - Fernridge
- 1939 - Tomito
- 1938 - Maikai
- 1938 - Gay Balkan
- 1937 - Manolive
- 1936 - Picaro
- 1935 - Cueesun
- 1933 - Cueesun
- 1932 - Alienist
- 1932 - Bonny Note
- 1931 - The Dimmer
- 1930 - Coolbarro
- 1929 - Jemidar
- 1927 - Au Fait
- 1927 - Phoenix Park
- 1925 - Mercato
- 1925 - Great Applause
- 1923 - Lilypond
- 1922 - Jolly Cosy
- 1921 - Earl Of Seafield
- 1920 - Seigneur
- 1919 - †Rivose / Eurythmic
- 1918 - Macadam
- 1917 - Downing Street
- 1916 - Lucky Escape
- 1915 - Irish Knight
- 1914 - Dollar Dictator
- 1913 - Artesian
- 1912 - Sparkle
- 1911 - Artesian
- 1910 - Jolly Beggar
- 1909 - Loch Shiel
- 1908 - Scorcher
- 1907 - Post Town
- 1906 - May King
- 1905 - Czarovitch
- 1904 - Blue Spec
- 1903 - Cypher
- 1902 - Novitiate
- 1901 - Flintlock
- 1901 - Australian
- 1900 - Carbineer
- 1899 - Mural
- 1898 - Le Var
- 1897 - Snapshot
- 1896 - Inverary
- 1895 - Durable
- 1894 - Scarpia
- 1893 - Scarpia
- 1892 - Wandering Willie
- 1891 - The Duke
- 1890 - Wandering Willie
- 1889 - Aim
- 1888 - Telephone
- 1887 - First Prince

† Dead heat

== 2023 Perth Cup incident ==
The 2023 Perth Cup was abandoned mid-race after a two-horse fall involving Dom To Shoot and Chili Is Hot. Chili Is Hot was euthanized on-site, while Dom To Shoot suffered leg abrasions but went on to make a full recovery. Both jockeys involved, Peter Knuckey and Jordan Turner, were uninjured. Jockey Joseph Azzopardi subsequently received a six-week ban, charged with riding carelessly on his mount Buster Bash, whose heels were clipped by Chili Is Hot, leading to the fall. The race was re-run two weeks later on 14 January 2023, and ironically was won by Buster Bash.

== 2008 race fall ==
The 2008 Perth Cup was marred by a six-horse fall which resulted in three jockeys being taken to hospital with minor injuries. Following a stewards inquiry, apprentice jockey Chloe Chatfield was suspended for 10 weeks. The race was won by favourite Cats Fun.

== See also ==
- Ted Van Heemst Stakes
- List of Australian Group races
- Group races
- Australian horse-racing
