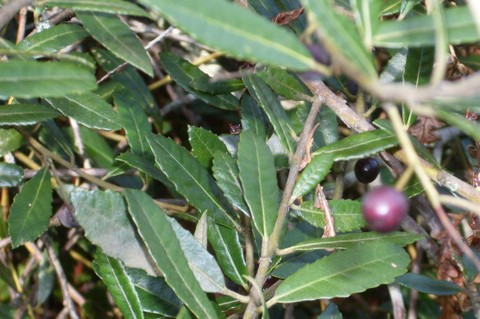
- Elaeocarpus holopetalus leaves and fruit

Scientific classification
- Kingdom: Plantae
- Clade: Tracheophytes
- Clade: Angiosperms
- Clade: Eudicots
- Clade: Rosids
- Order: Oxalidales
- Family: Elaeocarpaceae
- Genus: Elaeocarpus
- Species: E. holopetalus

Binomial name
- Elaeocarpus holopetalus F.Muell.

= Elaeocarpus holopetalus =

Black olive berry

Species of flowering plant endemic to Australia

Elaeocarpus holopetalus, commonly known as black olive berry, mountain blueberry, or mountain quandong, is species of flowering plant in the family Elaeocarpaceae and is endemic to eastern Australia. It is a shrub or small tree with regularly toothed, lance-shaped to egg-shaped leaves, racemes of white flowers and black, oval fruit.

== Description ==
Elaeocarpus holopetalus is a shrub or small tree typically growing to a height of 5–16 m (16–52 ft), although there are rare specimens are up to 25 m (82 ft) tall and 2 m (6 ft 7 in) wide at the base. The trunk is straight with relatively smooth dark grey or brown outer bark with some fissures and wrinkles. Young branchlets are densely covered with woolly-brownish or velvety hairs. The leaves are lance-shaped to elliptic, or egg-shaped with the narrower end towards the base, mostly 30–70 mm (1.2–2.8 in) long and 10–30 mm (0.39–1.18 in) wide on a petiole 3–10 mm (0.12–0.39 in) long. The leaves are mid to dark green above, paler below and the edges have regular teeth. The flowers are pendent and arranged in racemes 10–50 mm (0.39–1.97 in) long with up to seven flowers on softly-hairy, robust pedicels 15–25 mm (0.59–0.98 in) long. The flowers have five narrow triangular sepals about 16 mm (0.63 in) and 4 mm (0.16 in) wide, densely hairy on the back. The five petals are white, sometimes flushed with pink, about 18 mm (0.71 in) long and 6 mm (0.24 in) wide, the tips sometimes with shallow lobes. There are between fifteen and twenty stamens. Flowering occurs in November and December and the fruit is an oval, maroon drupe turning blackish and 6–8 mm (0.24–0.31 in) long when mature.

== Taxonomy ==
Elaeocarpus holopetalus was first formally described in 1861 by Ferdinand von Mueller in Fragmenta Phytographiae Australiae.

== Distribution and habitat ==
Black olive berry grows in and near the edges of cooler rainforest at altitudes up to 1,500 m (4,900 ft) from near Dorrigo, Ebor and Chaelundi National Park in northern New South Wales to East Gippsland in north-eastern Victoria.

== Gallery ==
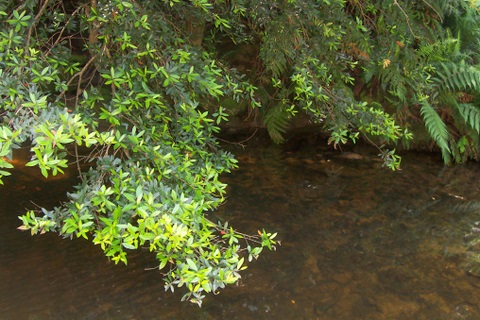
Blue Mountains National Park

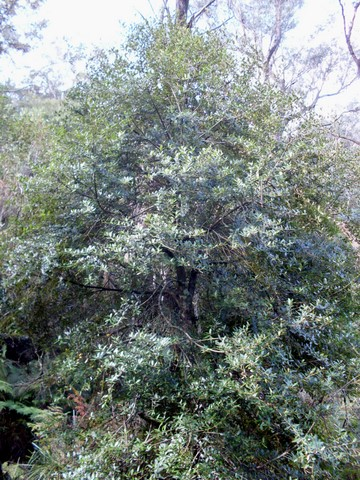
Blue Mountains National Park

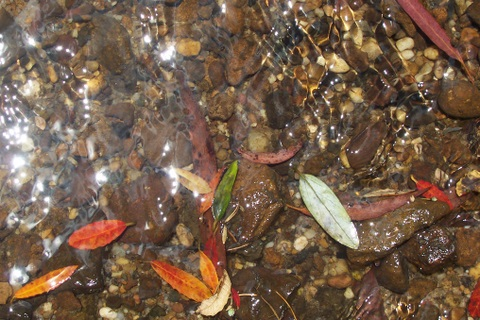
A mountain stream with orange/red senescent leaves of E. holopetalus, southern sassafras and Blue Mountains ash

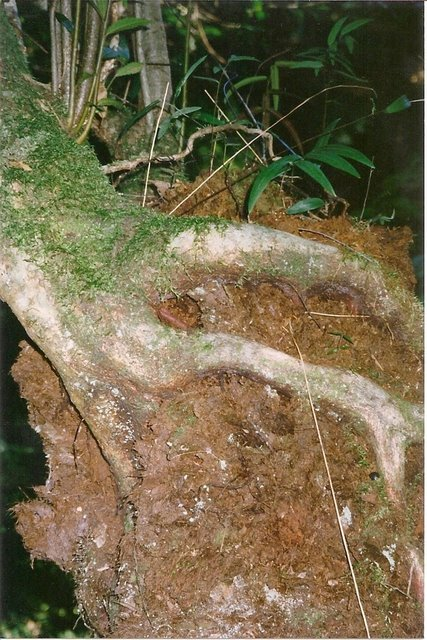
Black olive berry growing as a hemiepiphyte on a soft tree fern at Devil's Creek, South East Forest National Park

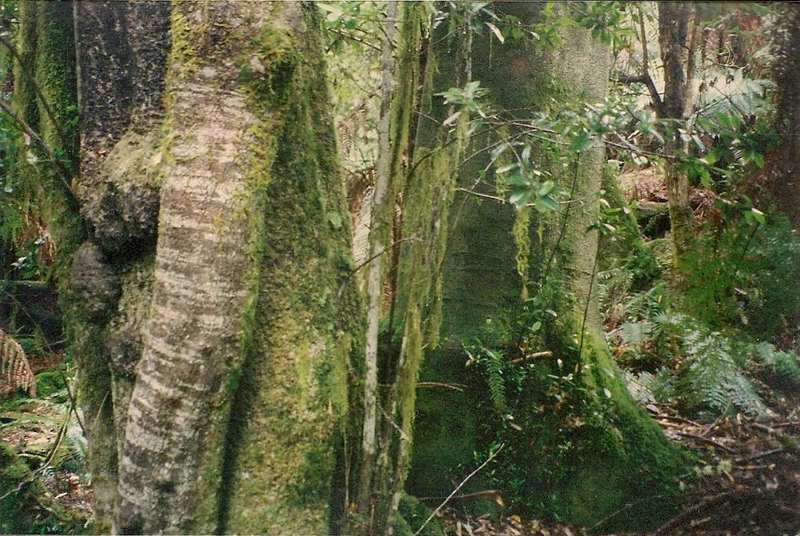
E. holopetalus (left) and southern sassafras (right) near Nimmitabel
