= Tia, New South Wales =

Tia New South Wales
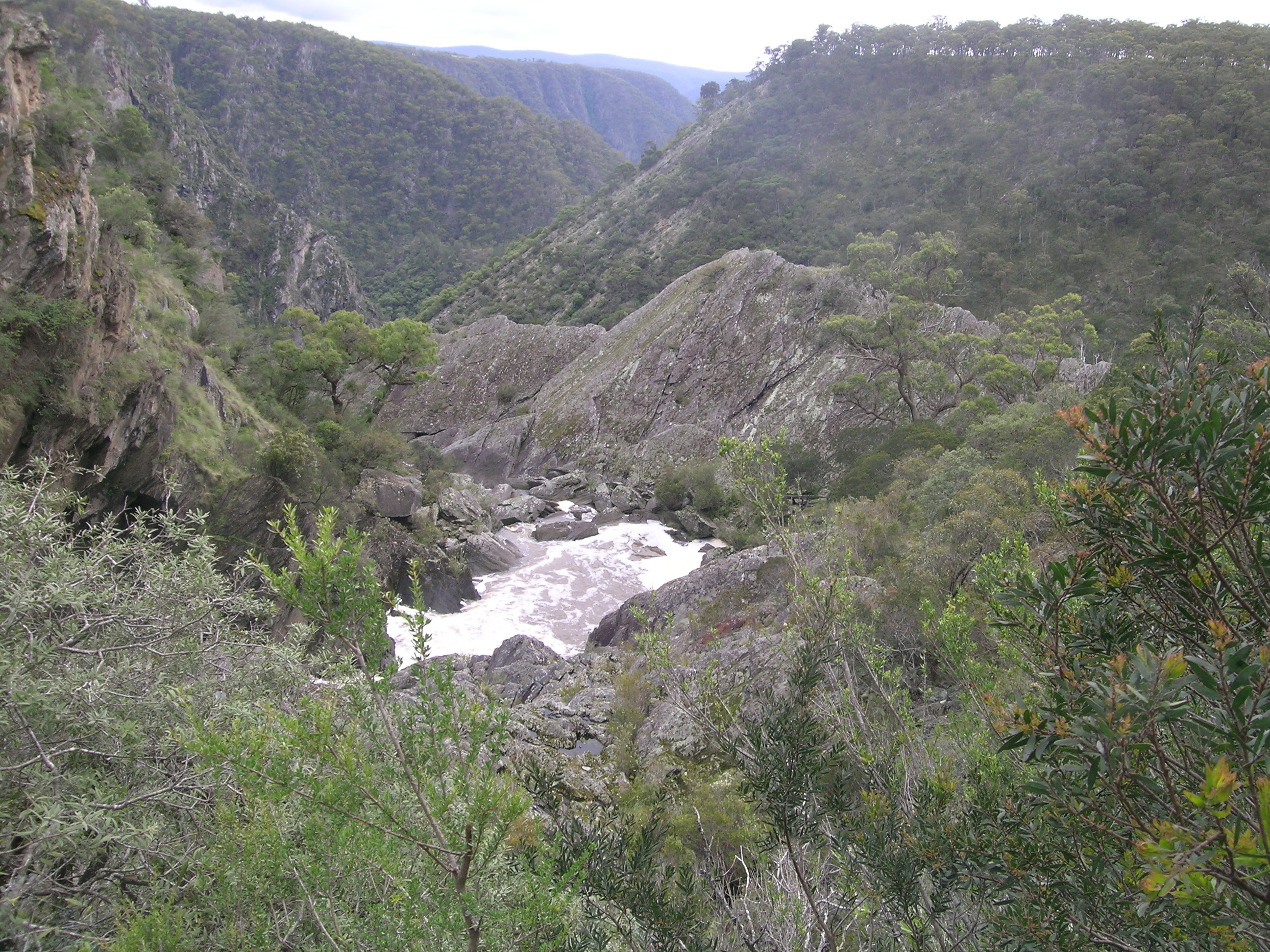
- Tia Gorge, Oxley Wild Rivers National Park

- Coordinates: 31°12′51″S 151°47′43″E
- Population: 376 (2006 census)
- Established: 1840
- Postcode(s): 2354
- LGA(s): Walcha Shire
- County: Vernon
- State electorate(s): Tamworth
- Federal division(s): New England

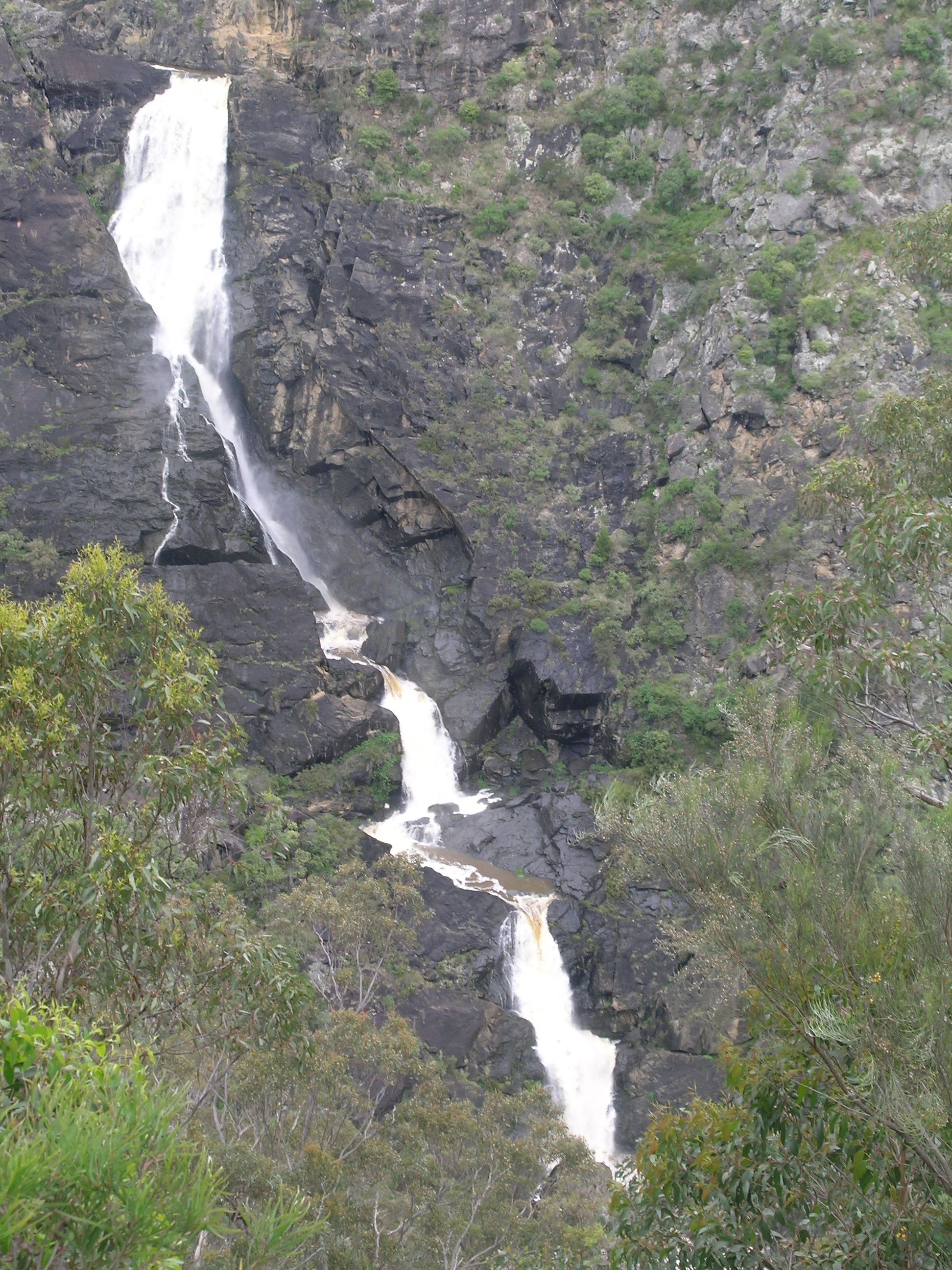
Tia Falls, Oxley Wild Rivers National Park, NSW

Tia, (pronounced ‘tie ah’) is a settlement and parish located approximately 30 kilometres east of Walcha, on the Northern Tablelands region of New South Wales, Australia.

== History ==
Tia River Station was first settled by Richard and William Denne in 1840, then comprising an area of 100 square miles (260 km^{2}). It was later purchased by Augustus Hooke in 1882. It was on this station that Blue Spec, a brown stallion foaled in 1899, was bred and who later won the Kalgoorlie Cup, Perth Cup and the 1905 Melbourne Cup in record time.

In 1893 the Tia Receiving Office was opened and later became a Post Office in 1901 and closed in 1977. The school has also been closed for quite a few years. The church still remains on the Tia Diggings Road.

In 1895 the following description of Tia appeared in the Uralla and Walcha Times: "Tia is situated about 25 miles from Walcha, on the Port Macquarie road or Oxley Highway, and may aptly be called a thorough poor man's fossicking ground, first on account of its accessibility and known auriferous character, and secondly on account of the low cost at which the necessities of life can be obtained."

=== Gold ===
The first gold mining activity was recorded at Tia in 1866. In 1873 a reef was discovered at McLeod’s Creek, when a rush occurred.

In 1877 two Scotsmen, Matheson and Mclntyre spent considerable effort tunnelling and digging shafts. In 1879 they erected a machine for crushing rock and constructed a race half a mile long to bring water to work the machine. After yields slightly over an ounce to the ton they sold out in 1887 to the Tia Gold Mining Company, which deepened shafts, and spent money on their operations, but with poor results. Large scale mining petered out, although fossicking continued for some years to come.

== Geography ==
The Tia River flows over Tia Falls and through the Tia Gorge which are part of the Oxley Wild Rivers National Park are typical New England Tablelands country and can be accessed by a six kilometre gravel access road off the Oxley Highway. Two walking tracks follow the gorge rim. The Falls walk goes to the Falls lookout and Tia Gorge viewing area and is 1.5 km return. Camping, information and picnic areas are available there.

== Demography ==
In the 2006 census, there were 376 persons usually resident in the Tia area.

== Economy ==
Fine wool, beef cattle and prime lambs sustain the local economy.
