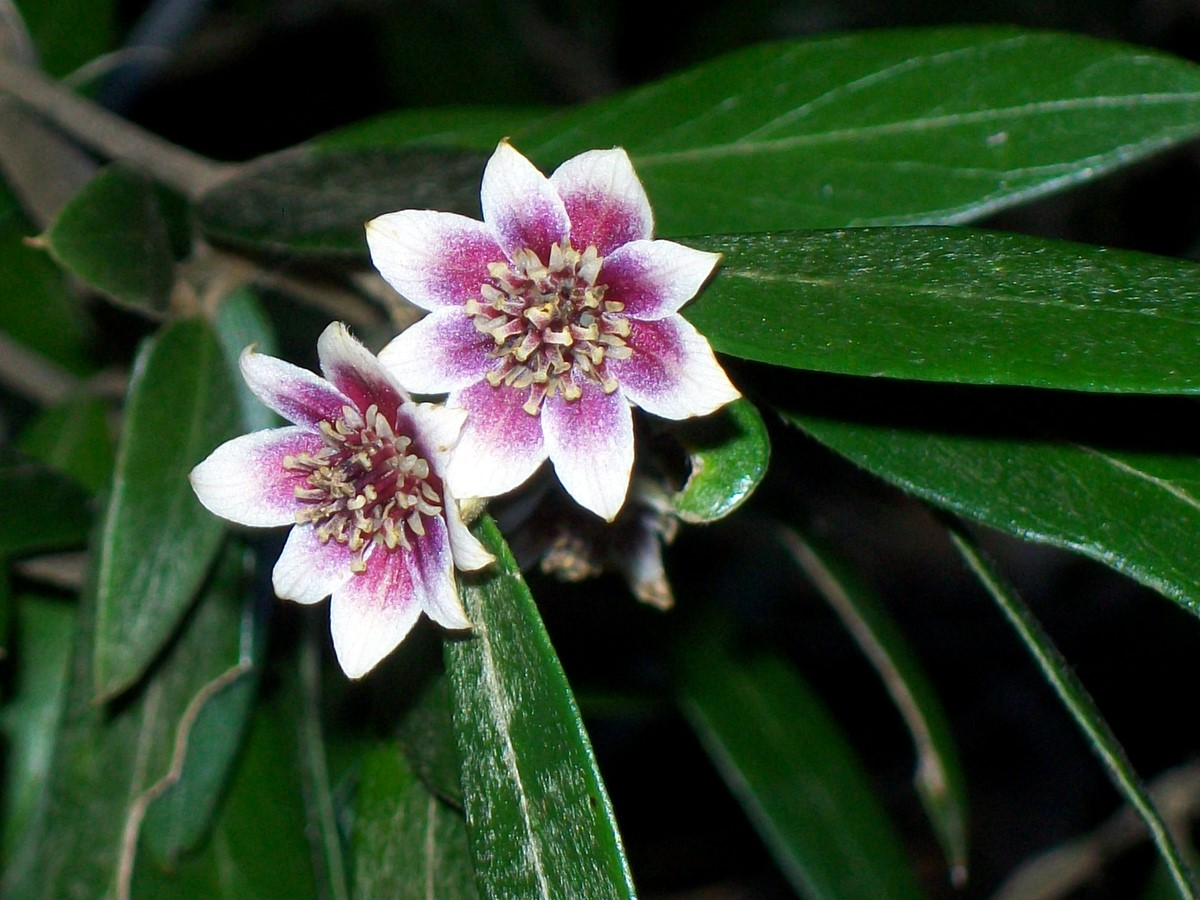

Scientific classification
- Kingdom: Plantae
- Clade: Tracheophytes
- Clade: Angiosperms
- Clade: Magnoliids
- Order: Laurales
- Family: Atherospermataceae
- Genus: Atherosperma
- Species: A. moschatum
- Subspecies: A. m. subsp. integrifolium

Trinomial name
- Atherosperma moschatum subsp. integrifolium (A.Cunn. ex Tul.) Schodde

Synonyms
- Atherosperma elongatum Gand.; Atherosperma integrifolium A.Cunn. ex Tul.

= Atherosperma moschatum subsp. integrifolium =

Subspecies of tree

Atherosperma moschatum subsp. integrifolium, commonly known as southern sassafras, narrow leaf sassafras or blackheart sassafras, is a flowering plant in the family Atherospermataceae and is endemic to New South Wales. It is a slender shrub or small tree with mostly lance-shaped leaves, white flowers and the fruit an achene.

== Description ==
Atherosperma moschatum subsp. integrifolium is a shrub or a medium-sized tree that typically grows to a height of 4–30 m (13–98 ft). Its leaves are arranged alternately along the stems, mostly lance-shaped, sometimes with the narrower end toward the base, or sometimes elliptic, nutmeg-scented when crushed, 30–95 mm (1.2–3.7 in) long and 8–23 mm (0.31–0.91 in) wide on a petiole 2–6 mm (0.08–0.24 in) long. The upper surface of the leaves is glossy green and the edges of young leaves are sometimes sparsely and irregularly toothed.

The flowers are pleasantly perfumed with cream-coloured to white tepals 6–10 mm (0.24–0.39 in) long and often streaked with purple. The receptacle is 10–12 mm (0.39–0.47 in) long and densely hairy. Flower buds appear in January and flowering occurs in August and September, followed by the fruit that is a densely hairy achene 10–20 mm (0.39–0.79 in) long.

== Taxonomy ==
This subspecies of A. moschatum was first described in 1855 by Edmond Tulasne who gave it the name Atherosperma integrifolium in the Archives du Muséum d'Histoire Naturelle, Paris from an unpublished description by Allan Cunningham. In 2007, Richard Schodde reduced this species to a subspecies of A. moschatum in the Flora of Australia, and its name is accepted by the Australian Plant Census.

== Distribution and habitat ==
This subspecies of A. moschatum grows in rainforest, often with Nothofagus moorei, at altitudes between 890 and 1,370 m (2,920 and 4,490 ft) between Barrington Tops and the Blue Mountains.

== Historical uses ==
The 1889 book The Useful Native Plants of Australia records that "The fragrant bark of this tree has been used as tea in Tasmania. A decoction or infusion of the green or dried bark was made, and according to Mr. Gunn, it has a pleasant taste when taken with plenty of milk. Its effect is, however, slightly aperient. It is also used in the form of a beer. The bark contains an agreeable bitter, of much repute as a tonic amongst sawyers. It is called Native Sassafras from the odour of its bark, due to an essential oil closely resembling true sassafras in odour. Bosisto likens the smell of the inner bark to new ale, and says that a decoction from this part of the tree is a good substitute for yeast in raising bread. It is diaphoretic and diuretic in asthma and other pulmonary affections, but it is known more especially for its sedative action on the heart, and it has been successfully used in some forms of heart disease. It is prepared of the strength of 4 ounces of the bark to 20 ounces of rectified spirit, and is given in doses of 30 to 60 drops, usually on a lump of sugar. The volatile oil of the bark alone is said to have a lowering action on the heart. See "Volatile and Essential Oils." The bark has been examined by N. Zeyer, who has found in it volatile oil, fixed oil, wax, albumin, gum, sugar, starch, butyric acid, an aromatic resin, iron-greening tannic acid, and an alkaloid which he designates atherospermine."

== Genetic study ==
Genetic studies of the subspecies, along with the more widespread southerly distributed subspecies, Atherosperma moschatum subsp. moschatum, have shown that populations of the subspecies A. m. integrifolium are the most strongly diverged of all populations within the range of the species at both isozymes and chloroplast DNA. These results are consistent with long-term isolation of these populations through at least the last glacial period.
