= Mummel Gulf National Park =

National park in Australia

- IUCN category II (national park)
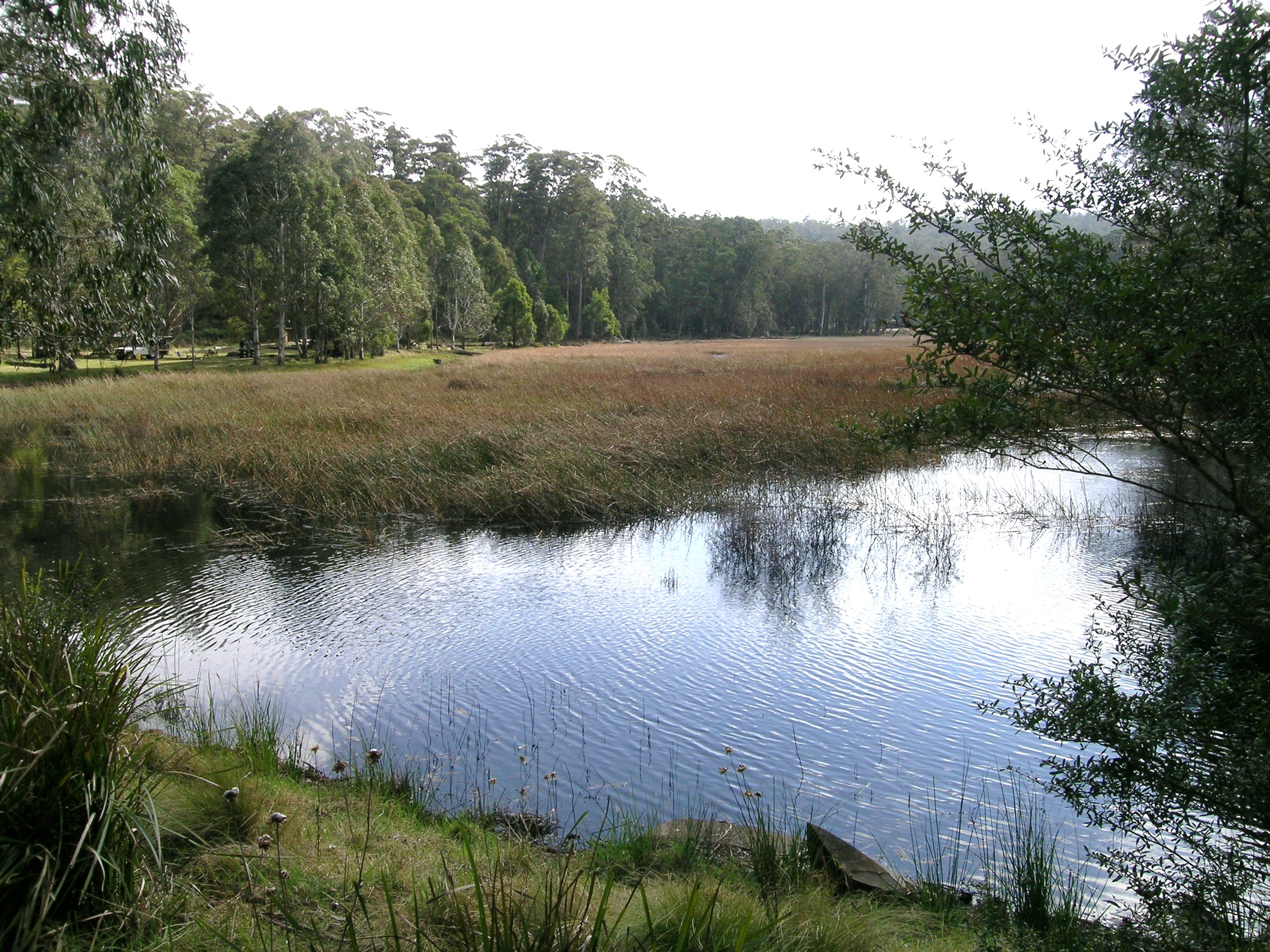
- New Country Swamp, Mummel Gulf National Park

- Location within New South Wales
- Location: New South Wales
- Nearest city: Walcha
- Coordinates: 31°18′45″S 151°50′40″E
- Area: 122 km^{2} (47 sq mi)
- Established: 1999
- Governing body: NSW National Parks and Wildlife Service
- Website: Official website

Mummel Gulf is a national park located in New South Wales, Australia, approximately 487 kilometres (303 mi) by road north of Sydney. It is situated approximately 50 kilometres (31 mi) southeast of Walcha on the unsealed Enfield Forest Road and 12 kilometres (7.5 mi) south of the Oxley Highway.

The Mummel River has formed the deep V-shaped gorge of the Mummel Gulf, which exceeds 400 metres (1,300 ft) in the head of this gorge.

== Flora and fauna ==
The Mummel Gulf National Park protects tall, open eucalypt forest on the south-eastern escarpment of the New England region. The park communities also include wet sclerophyll forest and snow gum (Eucalyptus pauciflora) forest in the higher parts of the park, around Porters Camp. Messmate (Eucalyptus obliqua) and less commonly Mountain Ribbon Gum (Eucalyptus nobilis) dominate old-growth forests in this area which drops from 1,450 metres down to 470 m. Other trees in the region include silvertop stringybark (Eucalyptus laevopinea), blue gum (Eucalyptus saligna), diehard stringybark (Eucalyptus cameronii) and New England blackbutt (Eucalyptus andrewsii). Broad-leaved pepperbush (Tasmannia purpurascens) is at its northern limit in the area. Many species of shrubs flower here during spring and summer.

Bushwalkers accessing the remote central and southern sections of the park's moist subtropical rainforest will find a mix of corkwood, sassafras (Doryphora sassafras), large tree ferns (Dicksonia) and silver sycamore (Cryptocarya glaucescens).

The park also protects threatened species such as the koala, tiger quoll, sugar glider, yellow-bellied glider, superb lyrebird, boobook owl, sooty owl, powerful owl, tawny frogmouth and parma wallaby.

== History ==
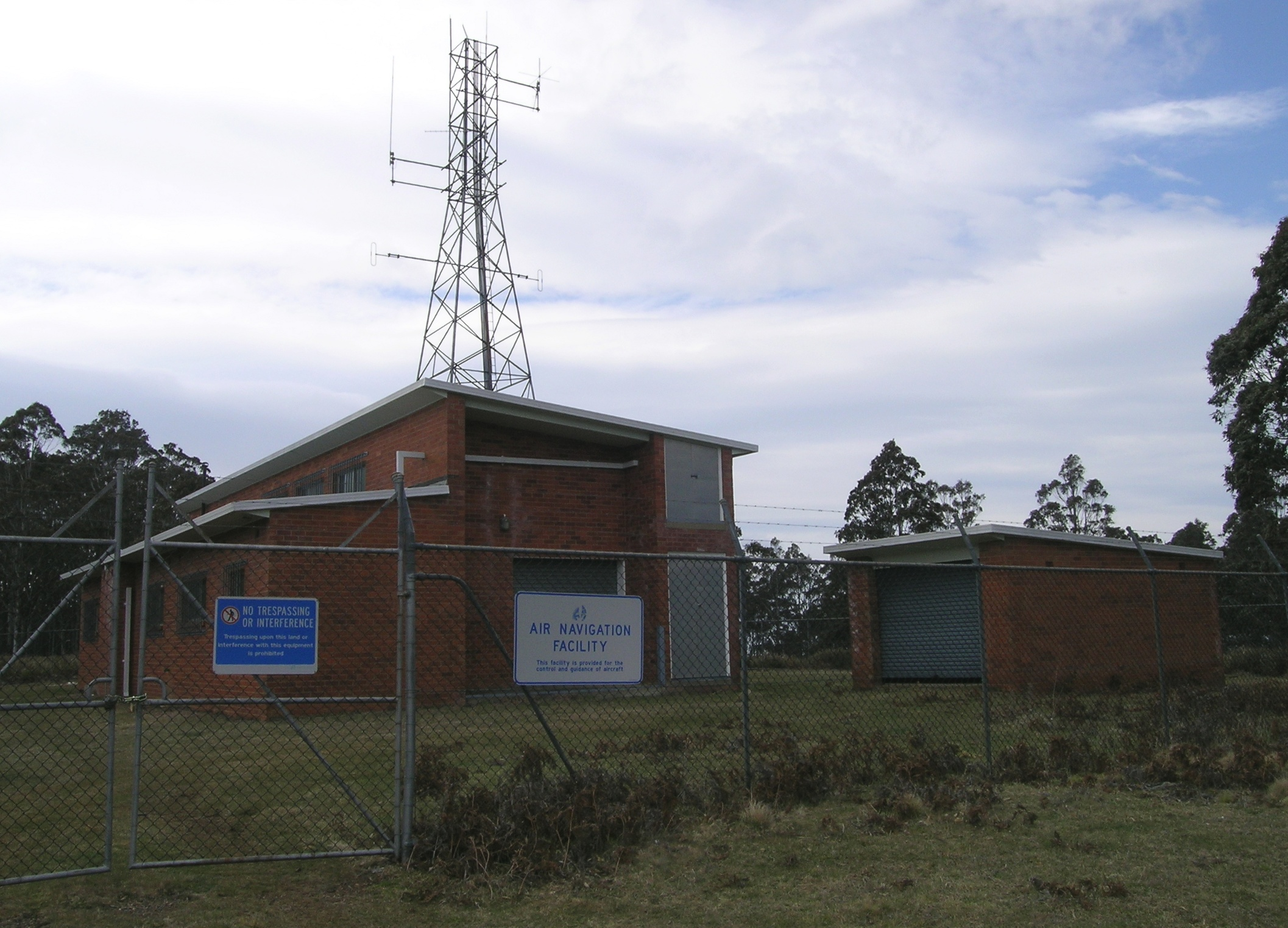
Porters Camp air navigation facility, Mummel Gulf National Park

This region and its escarpment served as the boundary between the Nganyaywana people of the Northern Tablelands and the Danggati who had the hinterland valleys leading up to the tableland.

The explorer John Oxley passed by the Apsley Falls in September 1818 and travelled eastwards through this area en route to Port Macquarie. Timber-getters and illegal settlers soon followed. The Wool Road (now the Oxley Highway), was built through here in 1842 with convict labour to link the wool-growing settlement of Walcha with Port Macquarie. Some of the park has been logged, although only small sections of the park have been cleared. Some areas have also been used for cattle grazing and for small-scale manganese mining.

In the 1970s Enfield and Riamukka State Forests were expanded over former Crown lands to include the steep areas of the Mummel River catchment.

The Bicentennial National Trail which was first used in the 1970s follows the Mummel Forest Road to the east of the park.

Porters (Camp) air navigation facility and Country Energy towers are situated at 1,448 metres (4,751 ft) AHD in the northern portion of the park.

In 1992 North-East Forest Alliance Forest (NEFA) protesters set up a camp in what is now Mummel Gulf National Park. NEFA protested against logging here and won an agreement to delay logging to allow a joint study by NEFA and the New South Wales Forestry Commission. Mummel Gulf National Park was created in 1999, as part of the national regional forest agreement process.

== Pest animals and weeds ==
Some wild pigs and wild dogs live in the park. The National Parks and Wildlife Service (NPWS) staff conduct pig trapping and shooting programs. A ground-baiting program is run in conjunction with Forests NSW and private landholders to help control wild dogs.

Crofton weed (Ageratina adenophora) and blackberry (Rubus fruticosus) are the main weeds of concern in the park.

== Access and facilities ==
The gravel road is accessible by all vehicles but it would be advisable to have a four-wheel drive (4WD) in wet conditions. The Panhandle Fire Trail is a 9.5 km four-wheel drive trail located within the park.

New Country Swamp has a basic camping area with toilets, picnic tables and barbecues situated 13 km from the highway and inside the National Park. Campsites are suitable for camper trailers or camping beside ones vehicle. Not suitable for caravans.

== See also ==
- Protected areas of New South Wales
