= The Celebrity Apprentice Australia season 4 =

The Celebrity Apprentice Australia
- Season 4
- Starring: Mark Bouris (CEO); Kerrie Anne (advisor); Shelley Barrett (advisor)
- No. of contestants: 12
- Winner: Sophie Monk
- No. of episodes: 10

Release
- Original network: Nine Network
- Original release: 16 September – 18 November 2015

Season chronology
- ← Previous; Season 3 Next → Season 5

The fourth season of The Celebrity Apprentice Australia premiered on the Nine Network on Wednesday 16 September 2015. Mark Bouris returned as CEO, while Kerri-Anne Kennerley and Shelley Barrett became the new boardroom advisors. On 21 July 2015, the cast was officially announced.

On 18 November, Sophie Monk was declared the winner of the season with the money going to her charity of choice, Make A Wish Foundation.

== Candidates ==
Candidate	Background	Original team	Age	Charity	Result	Raised
Sophie Monk	Model and Actress	Fearless	35	Make-A-Wish Foundation	The Celebrity Apprentice (18-11-2015)	$263,412
Tim Dormer	Big Brother Winner	Dream Team	31	Australia Zoo Wildlife Warriors	Fired in Finale (18-11-2015)	$28,152
Matt Cooper	NRL Legend	Dream Team	36	Sydney Children's Hospital Randwick	Fired in Task 9 (11-11-2015)	$20,000
Richard Reid	Hollywood Gossip Guru	Dream Team	47	Foodbank Australia	Fired in Task 9 (11-11-2015)	$15,000
Mel Greig	Ex Radio DJ	Fearless	33	Endometriosis Australia	Fired in Task 8 (04-11-2015)	$10,000
Tegan Martin	Miss Universe Australia	Fearless	22	Sydney Children’s Hospital Westmead (Metabolic Clinic)	Fired in Task 7 (28-10-2015)	$130,782
Gabi Grecko	Tabloid Sensation	Fearless	26	The Gay and Lesbian Foundation of Australia	Fired in Tasks 1 & 6 (21-10-2015)	
James Mathison	TV Host	Dream Team	37	Barnardos Australia	Fired in Task 5 (14-10-2015)	$25,000
Esther Anderson	Gold Logie Nominee	Fearless	36	Pink Hope	Fired in Task 4 (07-10-2015)	
Gina Liano	Real Housewife	Fearless	48	Cancer Council Victoria	Quit in Task 4 (07-10-2015)	
Geoffrey Edelsten	Celebrity Tycoon	Dream Team	72	Fight Cancer Foundation	Fired in Task 3 (30-09-2015)	$17,799
Blake Garvey	The Bachelor	Dream Team	32	ReachOut Australia	Fired in Task 2 (23-09-2015)	

== Weekly results ==
Candidate	Original team	Task 5 team	Task 6 team	Task 7 team	Task 8 team	Final task team	Application result	Record as project manager
Sophie Monk	Fearless	Dream Team	Fearless	Fearless	Dream Team	Fearless	The Celebrity Apprentice	2-0 (win in tasks 2 & 8)
Tim Dormer	Dream Team	Fearless	Dream Team	Dream Team	Dream Team	Dream Team	Fired in final task	1-0 (win in task 6)
Matt Cooper	Dream Team	Dream Team	Dream Team	Dream Team	Fearless		Fired in task 9	0-2 (loss in tasks 3 & 7)
Richard Reid	Dream Team	Dream Team	Dream Team	Fearless	Fearless		Fired in task 9	1-1 (win in task 7, loss in task 5)
Mel Greig	Fearless	Fearless	Fearless	Fearless	Fearless		Fired in task 8	1-1 (win in task 5, loss in task 8)
Tegan Martin	Fearless	Fearless	Fearless	Dream Team			Fired in task 7	1-0 (win in task 3)
Gabi Grecko	Fearless	Fearless	Fearless				Fired in tasks 1 & 6	0-1 (loss in task 6)
James Mathison	Dream Team	Dream Team					Fired in task 5	1-0 (win in task 4)
Esther Anderson	Fearless						Fired in task 4	0-1 (loss in task 4)
Gina Liano	Fearless						Quit in task 4	0-1 (loss in task 1)
Geoffrey Edelsten	Dream Team						Fired in task 3	1-0 (win in task 1)
Blake Garvey	Dream Team						Fired in task 2	0-1 (loss in task 2)

No.	Candidate	Elimination Chart									
No.	Candidate	1	2	3	4	5	6	7	8	9	10
1	Sophie	IN	WIN	IN	BR	BR	BR	IN	WIN	IN	CA
2	Tim	IN	IN	IN	IN	IN	WIN	BR	IN	IN	FIRED
3	Matt	IN	IN	LOSE	IN	IN	IN	LOSE	BR	FIRED	
4	Richard	IN	BR	IN	IN	LOSE	IN	WIN	BR	FIRED	
5	Mel	BR	IN	IN	IN	WIN	IN	IN	FIRED		
6	Tegan	IN	IN	WIN	BR	IN	BR	FIRED			
7	Gabi	FIRED			IN	IN	FIRED				
8	James	IN	IN	BR	WIN	FIRED					
9	Esther	IN	IN	IN	FIRED						
10	Gina	LOSE	IN	IN	QUIT						
11	Geoffrey	WIN	BR	FIRED							
12	Blake	IN	FIRED								

The candidate won the competition and was named the Celebrity Apprentice.
The candidate won as project manager on his/her team.
The candidate lost as project manager on his/her team.
The candidate was on the losing team.
The candidate was brought to the final boardroom.
The candidate was fired.
The candidate lost as project manager and was fired.
The candidate quit the competition.
The candidate was re-instated into the competition.
The candidate was absent during this week.

== Tasks ==
=== Task 1 ===
Airdate: 16 September 2015

Team Fearless Project Manager	The Dream Team Project Manager
Gina Liano	Geoffrey Edelsten
Task
Sales Challenge - To sell a large container full of different products including gnomes, toilet papers and even Eels.
Winning Team	Losing Team
The Dream Team	Team Fearless
Reasons for victory	Reasons for loss
Some of the members didn't keep promises which cost them money, however the team raised the most money	The team was split in two and did raise a good amount of money, but one team was going a far way to make their money and were not good at communication
Sent to Final Boardroom
Gina Liano, Gabi Grecko & Mel Greig
Fired
Gabi Grecko - for not being a team player and was the weakest link to the group
Notes
• At the beginning, Mr Bouris took each celebrities phones off them so they couldn't use their own contacts, he assigned them new phones

=== Task 2 ===
Airdate: 23 September 2015

Team Fearless Project Manager	The Dream Team Project Manager
Sophie Monk	Blake Garvey
Task
Tour Operators - each team must sell 30 tickets for cruise ship, they must deliver customer service and raise the most tips from the customers
Winning Team	Losing Team
Team Fearless	The Dream Team
Reasons for victory	Reasons for loss
Raised the most money thanks to Gina's high-dollar ticket sales and the team's first class experience for guests	Geoffrey did not secure high-dollar value donations and the team did not create a first class experience
Sent to Final Boardroom
Blake Garvey, Geoffrey Edelsten & Richard Reid
Fired
Blake Garvey - for not raising enough money and for being a poor project manager

=== Task 3 ===
Airdate: 30 September 2015

Team Fearless Project Manager	The Dream Team Project Manager
Tegan Martin	Matt Cooper
Task
Fitness Program - Make a fitness DVD and sell the DVD for the most money possible
Winning Team	Losing Team
Team Fearless	The Dream Team
Reasons for victory	Reasons for loss
Raised the most money because of both Tegan's contacts and the sales of DVDs to the people who attended their fitness program	Some of Geoffrey's contacts pulled out last minute, with him also not calling enough people and their awareness for the program was not good enough to get more people to come to their fitness class
Sent to Final Boardroom
Matt Cooper, Geoffrey Edelsten & James Mathison
Fired
Geoffrey Edelsten - for not living up to his potential and not using his contacts to bring in more money
Notes
• Tegan Martin initially won $150,782 for her charity, but asked for $20,000 to go to Matt Cooper's charity.

=== Task 4 ===
Airdate: 7 October 2015

Team Fearless Project Manager	The Dream Team Project Manager
Esther Anderson	James Mathison
Task
Financial Product - teams must sign up people to Mr Bouris's financial product, Guru. The winning project manager will receive $25,000 from Mr Bouris's
Winning Team	Losing Team
The Dream Team	Team Fearless
Reasons for victory	Reasons for loss
The team was well informed about the product and were able to communicate it better to members of the public, getting more people wanting appointments.	Even though they had more people sign-up for interviews, fewer people overall translated into wanting appointments, as members of the team were not properly informed about the product, inhibiting their abilities to reign in appointments.
Sent to Final Boardroom
Esther Anderson, Tegan Martin, Sophie Monk
Fired
Esther Anderson - for being unable to communicate and inform her team properly of the product information she had learned earlier in the day
Notes
• Gina Liano was hospitalised during this challenge and did not participate, revealing at the end of the episode in a video that she was leaving the competition because she felt she was unable to participate in the next challenge also. • Gabi Grecko was re-instated into the competition to replace Gina Liano. • The initial prize money for winning was $20,000 for the winning project manager's charity, however Mr Bouris was impressed with The Dream Team's performance and increased the total by $5,000.

=== Task 5 ===
Airdate: 14 October 2015

Team Fearless Project Manager	The Dream Team Project Manager
Mel Greig	Richard Reid
Team Reshuffle
Tim Dormer was swapped to Team Fearless & Sophie Monk was swapped to The Dream Team
Task
Live Home Shopping - Teams must fill 25 minutes of selling products on a home shopping channel and make the most sales possible
Winning Team	Losing Team
Team Fearless	The Dream Team
Reasons for victory	Reasons for loss
The team had great sense of direction, each segment was successful and they did a great job at selling their products	Despite Richard's great presentation he didn't make solid decisions, instead wanted the group consensus. Sophie choose a poor product to discuss and James had poor communication as the producer.
Sent to Final Boardroom
Richard Reid, James Mathison, Sophie Monk
Fired
James Mathison - for not being able to communicate well to the presenters and not fulfilling his responsibilities as a producer

=== Task 6 ===
Airdate: 21 October 2015

Team Fearless Project Manager	The Dream Team Project Manager
Gabi Grecko	Tim Dormer
Team Reshuffle
Tim Dormer and Sophie Monk were swapped back to their original teams
Task
Catering - Each team have to run a food stall at a Roosters home game, they must serve the people and try and sell tickets to the Corporate Box
Winning Team	Losing Team
The Dream Team	Team Fearless
Reasons for victory	Reasons for loss
They sold all their corporate box tickets to one company, with the corporate box having a great atmosphere and worked together in the kitchen, constantly keeping it clean and keeping things in order	They didn't sell all their corporate box tickets and the atmosphere of their corporate box was uneasy. The team didn't work together in their kitchen, they were unclean and were not consistent. Gabi was also an ineffective project manager, not making too many decisions.
Sent to Final Boardroom
Gabi Grecko, Tegan Martin & Sophie Monk
Fired
Gabi Grecko - for being unable to lead her team and being a poor project manager
Notes
• Mel Greig had a family emergency and could not attend this challenge, which equaled out the teams

=== Task 7 ===
Airdate: 28 October 2015

Team Fearless Project Manager	The Dream Team Project Manager
Richard Reid	Matt Cooper
Team Reshuffle
Richard Reid was swapped to Team Fearless & Tegan Martin was swapped to The Dream Team
Task
Scavenger Hunt - each team must buy 10 items that represent Australia's biggest hopes and dreams. The team who spends the least money, after running around the city on a supersized scavenger hunt, will win.
Winning Team	Losing Team
Team Fearless	The Dream Team
Reasons for victory	Reasons for loss
The team had good time management, were good negotiators and even though they missed three items, the items they did get were good quality	Even though the team got eight items compared to Fearless' seven, four of them were not in good condition and not to the right specifications. The team's time management also lacked.
Sent to Final Boardroom
Matt Cooper, Tim Dormer & Tegan Martin
Fired
Tegan Martin - for not paying enough attention to the details of the items that she was getting, with three of four items that the team were penalized for being her responsibility

=== Task 8 ===
Airdate: 4 November 2015

Team Fearless Project Manager	The Dream Team Project Manager
Mel Greig	Sophie Monk
Team Reshuffle
Matt Cooper was swapped to Team Fearless & Sophie Monk was swapped to The Dream Team
Task
Beauty Expo - each team will launch their own beauty service at a busy expo and try to make the most money for charity.
Winning Team	Losing Team
The Dream Team	Team Fearless
Reasons for victory	Reasons for loss
Sent to Final Boardroom
Mel Greig, Matt Cooper & Richard Reid
Fired
Mel Greig - for assuming her teammates would pick up her slack when it came to donations, and for not learning anything in this challenge

=== Task 9 ===
Airdate: 11 November 2015

Team Fearless Project Manager	The Dream Team Project Manager
No Project Managers
Task
Creative Challenge - The teams need to find clues and get given tasks (sell fish, sell a wedding dress & make an advert for Couriers Please) at three Couriers Please locker stations around the city
Winning Team	Losing Team
The Dream Team	Team Fearless
Reasons for victory	Reasons for loss
Both Tim & Sophie were the strongest links and were most creative in the challenge	Richard struggled to take control in this task and floundered under pressure and Matt was the weakest link creatively
Sent to Final Boardroom
All
Fired
Richard Reid - for letting the pressure of the tasks get to him Matt Cooper - for being the least creative person left in the competition

=== Final Task ===
Airdate : 18 November 2015

Team Fearless Final Celebrity	The Dream Team Final Celebrity
Sophie Monk	Tim Dormer
Task
Australia Campaign - the final 2 celebrities need to create a unique and clever campaign to brand Australia, this will include a Print & Television Advert to be presented at a Finale Gala Event
Fired
Tim Dormer
The Celebrity Apprentice
Sophie Monk

== Ratings ==
Colour key:
– Highest rating during the series
– Lowest rating during the series

The Celebrity Apprentice Australia (season 4) overnight ratings, with metropolitan viewership and nightly position
Episode		Original airdate	Timeslot (approx.)	Viewers (millions)	Night Rank	Source
1	"The Shipping Container"	16 September 2015	Wednesday 8:40 pm	566,000	#19	
2	"Tall Ship Tour"	23 September 2015	Wednesday 8:40 pm	555,000	#18	
3	"The Gym"	30 September 2015	Wednesday 8:40 pm	593,000	#15	
4	"Yellow Brick Road Guru"	7 October 2015	Wednesday 8:40 pm	547,000	#18	
5	"Live Home Shopping"	14 October 2015	Wednesday 8:40 pm	643,000	#15	
6	"Celebrity Catering"	21 October 2015	Wednesday 8:40 pm	561,000	#17	
7	"Buy Ten Items"	28 October 2015	Wednesday 8:40 pm	599,000	#16	
8	"Beauty Expo"	4 November 2015	Wednesday 8:40 pm	646,000	#15	
9	"Couriers Please"	11 November 2015	Wednesday 8:40 pm	645,000	#15	
10	"Final Task"	18 November 2015	Wednesday 8:40 pm	638,000	#13	

== See also ==
- The Celebrity Apprentice Australia season 1
- The Celebrity Apprentice Australia season 2
- The Celebrity Apprentice Australia season 3
