= The Celebrity Apprentice Australia season 5 =

The Celebrity Apprentice Australia
- Season 5
- Starring: Lord Alan Sugar (CEO); Lorna Jane Clarkson (advisor); Janine Allis (advisor)
- No. of contestants: 14
- Winner: Shaynna Blaze
- No. of episodes: 12

Release
- Original network: Nine Network
- Original release: 23 May – 15 June 2021

Additional information
- Filming dates: 12 October – 2 December 2020

Season chronology
- ← Previous; Season 4 Next → Season 6

The fifth season of The Celebrity Apprentice Australia premiered on the Nine Network on 23 May 2021, following a six-year absence. British business magnate and The Apprentice UK host, Lord Alan Sugar leads the series as CEO, while Lorna Jane Clarkson and Janine Allis became the new boardroom advisors.

On 15 June 2021, Shaynna Blaze was declared the winner of the season with the money going to her charity of choice, Voice of Change.

== Production ==
In July 2020, Nine reportedly commissioned Warner Brothers Australia, current owners of the franchise, to make a new season of The Celebrity Apprentice for 2021, series CEO Mark Bouris will not be returning. In September 2020, Nine confirmed at their yearly upfronts that the series will officially return in 2021 with British business magnate and The Apprentice UK host and CEO, Lord Alan Sugar leading the series, along with the reveal of Michelle Bridges, Michael "Wippa" Wipfli and Olivia Vivian as some of the competing celebrities. On 12 October, Nine announced the full list of celebrities competing in the season. In the same month, Josh Gibson and Scherri-Lee Biggs were also announced as competing celebrities.

== Candidates ==
Candidate	Background	Original team	Charity	Result	Raised
Shaynna Blaze	Interior Designer & The Block Judge	Momentum	Voice of Change	The Celebrity Apprentice (15-06-2021)	$489,000
Ross Noble	British Comedian	Fun-Raisers	Australian Red Cross - Disaster Response and Recovery Fund	Fired in Finale (15-06-2021)	$103,500
Martha Kalifatidis	Reality TV Contestant	Momentum	Bully Zero	Fired in task 11 (14–06–2021)	$40,000
Josh Gibson	Australian Rules Footballer	Fun-Raisers	My Room	Fired in task 11 (14–06–2021)	$20,000
Michael "Wippa" Wipfli	Radio Presenter & Comedian	Fun-Raisers	Cooper Rice-Branding Foundation	Fired in task 10 (13–06–2021)	$184,500
Camilla Franks	Fashion Designer	Fun-Raisers	National Breast Cancer Foundation	Fired in task 9 (08–06–2021)	$20,000
Scherri-Lee Biggs	Miss Universe Australia 2011	Momentum	Dress For Success Perth	Fired in task 8 (07–06–2021)	$20,000
David Genat	Model & winner of Australian Survivor: All Stars	Momentum	The Garvan Institute	Fired in task 7 (06–06–2021)	$20,000
The Veronicas	Pop Star Twins	Momentum	The Brain Foundation	Fired in task 6 (06–06–2021)	$244,500^{a}
Michelle Bridges	Personal Trainer	Fun-Raisers	Women’s Community Shelters	Fired in task 6 (01–06–2021)	$20,000
Anthony Callea	Singer	Fun-Raisers	Children’s Cancer Foundation	Fired in task 4 (30–05–2021)	$20,000
Olivia Vivian	Olympic Artistic Gymnast	Momentum	Melanoma Institute Australia	Fired in task 3 (25–05–2021)	
Rob Shehadie	Actor & Comedian	Fun-Raisers	Save Our Sons	Fired in task 2 (24–05–2021)	
Alex Hayes	Influencer & Surfer	Momentum	Batyr	Fired in task 1 (23–05–2021)	

== Weekly results ==
Candidate	Original team	Task 4 team	Task 7 team	Task 8 team	Task 9 team	Application Result	Record as project manager
Shaynna Blaze	Momentum	Fun-Raisers	Fun-Raisers	Momentum	Momentum	The Celebrity Apprentice	1–2 (win in task 6, loss in tasks 1 & 9)
Ross Noble	Fun-Raisers	Momentum	Momentum	Momentum	Fun-Raisers	Runner-up in final task	1–2 (win in task 11, loss in tasks 7 & 8)
Martha Kalifatidis	Momentum	Fun-Raisers	Fun-Raisers	Fun-Raisers	Momentum	Fired in task 11	2–1 (win in tasks 7 & 10, loss in task 4)
Josh Gibson		Fun-Raisers	Momentum	Fun-Raisers	Fun-Raisers	Fired in task 11	1–1 (win in task 9, loss in task 5)
Michael “Wippa” Wipfli	Fun-Raisers	Fun-Raisers	Fun-Raisers	Fun-Raisers	Fun-Raisers	Fired in task 10	1–1 (win in task 1, loss in task 10)
Camilla Frank	Fun-Raisers	Fun-Raisers	Fun-Raisers	Fun-Raisers	Momentum	Fired in task 9	1–1 (win in task 8, loss in task 2)
Scherri-Lee Biggs		Momentum	Momentum	Momentum		Fired in task 8	1–0 (win in task 4)
David Genat	Momentum	Momentum	Momentum			Fired in task 7	1–0 (win in task 2)
The Veronicas	Momentum	Momentum				Fired in task 6	0–1 (loss in task 6)
Michelle Bridges	Fun-Raisers	Momentum				Fired in task 6	1–0 (win in task 5)
Anthony Callea	Fun-Raisers	Fun-Raisers				Fired in task 4	1–0 (win in task 3)
Olivia Vivian	Momentum					Fired in task 3	0–1 (loss in task 3)
Rob Shehadie	Fun-Raisers					Fired in task 2	
Alex Hayes	Momentum					Fired in task 1	

No.	Candidate	Elimination chart											
No.	Candidate	1	2	3	4	5	6	7	8	9	10	11	12
1	Shaynna	LOSE	IN	BR	BR	LOSS	WIN	IN	BR	LOSE	IN	IN	WIN
2	Ross	IN	BR	IN	IN	IN	LOSS	LOSE	LOSE	IN	BR	WIN	LOSS
3	Martha	BR	IN	BR	LOSE	LOSS	IN	WIN	IN	BR	WIN	LOSS	
4	Josh				LOSS	LOSE	IN	BR	IN	WIN	BR	LOSS	
5	Wippa	WIN	LOSS	IN	LOSS	LOSS	IN	IN	IN	IN	FIRED		
6	Camilla	IN	LOSE	IN	LOSS	LOSS	IN	IN	WIN	FIRED			
7	Scherri-Lee				WIN	IN	BR	LOSS	FIRED				
8	David	LOSS	WIN	LOSS	IN	IN	LOSS	FIRED					
9	The Veronicas	LOSS	IN	LOSS	IN	IN	FIRED						
10	Michelle	IN	LOSS	IN	IN	WIN	FIRED						
11	Anthony	IN	LOSS	WIN	FIRED								
12	Olivia	LOSS	IN	FIRED									
13	Rob	WIN	FIRED										
14	Alex	FIRED											

The candidate won the competition and was named the Celebrity Apprentice.
The candidate won as project manager on his/her team.
The candidate lost as project manager on his/her team.
The candidate was on the losing team.
The candidate was brought to the final boardroom.
The candidate was fired.
The candidate lost as project manager and was fired.

== Tasks ==
=== Task 1 ===
Airdate: 23 May 2021

Team Momentum Project Manager	Team Fun-Raisers Project Manager
Shaynna Blaze	Michael "Wippa" Wipfli
Task
Create three selfie-inspired artworks and sell them at a charity auction for the most money
Winning Team	Losing Team
Team Fun-Raisers	Team Momentum
Reasons for victory	Reasons for loss
Raised the most money in the charity auction, due to Wippa bringing in buyers to the auction.	Raised the least money in the charity auction, due to a poor selection of muses.
Sent to Final Boardroom
Shaynna Blaze, Alex Hayes, Martha Kalifatidis
Fired
Alex Hayes - volunteering as a muse despite being less well-known than his teammates, producing a poor artwork and failing to materialise buyers at the auction.
Notes
During the first task advisors Janine Allis & Lorna Jane Clarkson went undercover and temporarily joined Team Momentum & Team Fun-Raisers respectively. They were not permitted to have any influence on the decision making process of the task.

=== Task 2 ===
Airdate: 24 May 2021

Team Momentum Project Manager	Team Fun-Raisers Project Manager
David Genat	Camilla Franks
Task
Create their very own Big Bus tour and deliver the ultimate Sydney tourism experience with the winning team decided by how satisfied their customers are.
Winning Team	Losing Team
Team Momentum	Team Fun-Raisers
Reasons for victory	Reasons for loss
Despite abandoning their Welcome to Country park tour, the team received a 94.5 percent satisfaction rate from the customers	Their tour seemed to centre itself more around Camilla's clothing line than anything else and received a 87.8 percent satisfaction rate from the customers
Sent to Final Boardroom
Camilla Franks, Ross Noble, Rob Shehadie
Fired
Rob Shehadie - for his poor performance as a tour guide, despite being a resident of Sydney.

=== Task 3 ===
Airdate: 25 May 2021

Team Momentum Project Manager	Team Fun-Raisers Project Manager
Olivia Vivian	Anthony Callea
Task
Create a yum cha menu for a kitchens diners
Winning Team	Losing Team
Team Fun-Raisers	Team Momentum
Reasons for victory	Reasons for loss
$1,024 profit made from the challenge. Although they overspent on meat and the high price for one of their items was criticised, they ultimately raised the most money despite some refunds.	$964 profit made from the challenge. The team neglected to buy their dumpling wrappers until after service began which left them with less time to sell.
Sent to Final Boardroom
Olivia Vivian, Shayna Blaze, Martha Kalifatidis
Fired
Olivia Vivian - did not take control properly towards her team and did not make many decisions or provide many solutions

=== Task 4 ===
Airdate: 30 May 2021

Team Momentum Project Manager	Team Fun-Raisers Project Manager
Scherri-Lee Biggs	Martha Kalifatidis
Team Reshuffle
Martha and Shaynna move to Fun-Raisers. Michelle and Ross move to Momentum.
Task
Create a Budgie Smuggler swim wear line and showcase it in a fashion show judged by executive staff Adam and Brendan.
Winning Team	Losing Team
Team Momentum	Team Fun-Raisers
Reasons for victory	Reasons for loss
Their swimwear designs were well-received by the judges and the fashion show was captivating.	Despite their designs receiving praise, their lack of organisation led to the fashion show being less engaging.
Sent to Final Boardroom
Martha Kalifatidis, Anthony Callea, Shaynna Blaze
Fired
Anthony Callea - for poorly organising his team's fashion show and staying under the radar.
Notes
After the new teams were announced, Josh Gibson and Scherri-Lee Biggs were introduced into the competition and joined Team Fun-Raisers & Team Momentum respectively.

=== Task 5 ===
Airdate: 31 May 2021

Team Momentum Project Manager	Team Fun-Raisers Project Manager
Michelle Bridges	Josh Gibson
Task
Create a stage play promoting Boost Juice's barbeque sauce and mango smoothie, with the winning team determined by an audience vote.
Winning Team	Losing Team
Team Momentum	Team Fun-Raisers
Reasons for victory	Reasons for loss
Received majority of audience votes believing that their play made them want to buy the product.	Received fewer audience votes believing that their play made them want to buy the product.
Sent to Final Boardroom
—N/a
Fired
—N/a
Notes
Lord Sugar decided not to fire anyone from Team Fun-Raisers due to difficulty in pin-pointing a candidate responsible for their loss and because their play was also well-received. However, Sugar then announced that two candidates would be fired following the next task.

=== Task 6 ===
Airdate: 1 June 2021

Team Momentum Project Manager	Team Fun-Raisers Project Manager
The Veronicas	Shaynna Blaze
Task
Upcycle at least ten items from a junkyard for the highest market valuation determined by an appraiser, and sell them at a market.
Winning Team	Losing Team
Team Fun-Raisers	Team Momentum
Reasons for victory	Reasons for loss
Greater market valuation of $6,193 and created 22 upcycled items.	Between $5,100 - $5,200 market valuation and only upcycled 18 items.
Sent to Final Boardroom
Michelle Bridges, Scherri-Lee Biggs, The Veronicas
Fired
Michelle Bridges — Neglected to contact the shared electrician until the following day and instead prioritised upcycling items. The Veronicas — for not following Ross' advice or bringing David into the boardroom
Notes
After The Veronicas were fired, Shaynna promised them that she would share the money Team Momentum had raised ($5,100) with their charity, the Brain Foundation.^{[a]}

=== Task 7 ===
Airdate: 6 June 2021

Team Momentum Project Manager	Team Fun-Raisers Project Manager
Ross Noble	Martha Kalitatidis
Team Reshuffle
Josh moves to Momentum.
Task
Create a puppy video which has the highest potential to go viral, judged by Lord Sugar.
Winning Team	Losing Team
Team Fun-Raisers	Team Momentum
Reasons for victory	Reasons for loss
Although it lacked professional quality, their video that was judged as having a higher potential to go viral.	Creating a video with less potential to go viral, due to a lack of a call to action.
Sent to Final Boardroom
Josh Gibson, David Genat, Ross Noble
Fired
David Genat - For not participating in tasks in the best interests of his team
Notes
Lord Alan Sugar revealed that the winning team's project manager would win a "secret power", revealed in the next episode as the ability to swap a member of their team for a member of the opposing team.

=== Task 8 ===
Airdate: 7 June 2021

Team Momentum Project Manager	Team Fun-Raisers Project Manager
Ross Noble	Camila Franks
Team Reshuffle
Shaynna move to Fun-Raisers. Josh move to Momentum.
Task
Create a display cube for Koala Furniture and generate the most leads (points) through customers filling in a form.
Losing Team	Winning Team
Team Momentum	Team Fun-Raisers
Reasons for loss	Reasons for victory
53 points earned. Their clinical approach to the task was less engaging and was marred by providing factually incorrect details about the brand.	82 points earned. The light-hearted experience associated with their display cube was engaging and received a greater number of points.
Sent to Final Boardroom
Ross Noble, Scherri-Lee Biggs, Shaynna Blaze
Fired
Scherri-Lee Biggs - Did not attract enough potential customers to fill out the form.
Notes
During the task, Koala staff member Dana went undercover and visited both teams' displays. She then could allocate up to 30 bonus points for each team.

=== Task 9 ===
Airdate: 8 June 2021

Team Momentum Project Manager	Team Fun-Raisers Project Manager
Shaynna Blaze	Josh Gibson
Team Reshuffle
Ross move to Fun-Raisers. Camilla and Martha move to Momentum.
Task
Host the ultimate sleepover at Madame Tussauds for six kids and their parents, within a budget of $1,000. The winning team is determined by a satisfaction survey filled out by the attendees.
Winning Team	Losing Team
Team Fun-Raisers	Team Momentum
Reasons for victory	Reasons for loss
344 of 360 customer satisfaction score. Despite the pizza arriving late, their experience pleased attendees and they received a higher score.	325 of 360 customer satisfaction score. Budgeting issues left them without money to provide attendees breakfast for the following morning.
Sent to Final Boardroom
Camilla Franks, Martha Kalifatidis, Shaynna Blaze
Fired
Camilla Franks - miscalculated the prices of sleeping arrangements which resulted in the team's budget constraints.
Notes
Wippa was forced to bail out of the challenge early after developing gastro, leaving only Josh and Ross to host their team's party

=== Task 10 ===
Airdate: 13 June 2021

Team Momentum Project Manager	Team Fun-Raisers Project Manager
Martha Kalifatidis	Michael "Wippa" Wipfli
Task
Develop and create ice cream flavours and sell them to the public for the greatest profit.
Winning Team	Losing Team
Team Momentum	Team Fun-Raisers
Reasons for victory	Reasons for loss
$1,636 total sales. The inclusion of a $50 ice cream option enabled them to generate greater sales.	$682.50 total sales. Their initial pricing and delay in finding a sales location limited their capacity to create sales.
Sent to Final Boardroom
Michael "Wippa" Wipfli, Josh Gibson, Ross Noble
Fired
Michael "Wippa" Wipfli - poor organisation with the task and initially setting the prices of the ice cream too cheaply.
Notes
Purchases made by Martha’s close contacts, worth $1,175, were deducted from Team Momentum’s total sales since these purchases were prohibited as per the provisions of the task.

=== Task 11 ===
Airdate: 14 June 2021

Team Momentum Project Manager	Team Fun-Raisers Project Manager
No Project Managers
Task
Add value to a pile of "unsellable" items (sand, lemons, tennis balls and ropes) to sell at a farmer's market for the most profit.
Winning Candidate	Losing Candidates
Ross Noble	Martha Kalifatidis; Josh Gibson; Shaynna Blaze
Reasons for victory	Reasons for loss
Earning $1334, which was the most money made, at the market	Earning less money at the market
Sent to Final Boardroom
Martha Kalifatidis, Josh Gibson, Shaynna Blaze
Fired
Josh Gibson — for not convincing Lord Sugar that he should be a finalist. Martha Kalifatidis — Lord Sugar and his advisors thought that Martha's arguments in the boardroom reflected her desire to win for personal benefits rather than for her charity.
Notes
Josh pulled his hamstring at the beginning of the task when the celebrities were running to pick their "unsellable" items. He chose to complete an MRI scan and get medical clearance before he returned to the task with two hours left to create his products to seek at the market on the next day. Reigning The Celebrity Apprentice Australia champion Sophie Monk appeared during the task to give advice to the celebrities. Ross won his way into the grand final for earning the most money leaving the other three contestants to plead their case to Lord Sugar for the second place in the grand final. Shaynna won the spot leaving Martha and Josh fired.

=== Final Task ===
Airdate: 15 June 2021

Team Momentum Final Celebrity	Team Fun-Raisers Final Celebrity
Shaynna Blaze	Ross Noble
Task
The two final celebrities had to create the ultimate VIP charity event, within a budget of $15,000, and raise the most money for their charity.
Fired
Ross Noble
The Celebrity Apprentice
Shaynna Blaze
Notes
The Celebrity Apprentice won all their earnings from their charity event and an additional A$100,000 for their chosen charity. The runner-up also won their earnings from their charity event for their chosen charity.

== Ratings ==
Colour key:
– Highest rating during the series
– Lowest rating during the series

The Celebrity Apprentice Australia (season 5) overnight ratings, with metropolitan viewership and nightly position
Episode		Original airdate	Timeslot (approx.)	Viewers	Night Rank	Source
1	"Task 1: Selfie-inspired artworks" "Boardroom"	23 May 2021	Sunday 7:00 pm	748,000 876,000	4 3	
2	"Task 2: Sydney tourism" "Boardroom"	24 May 2021	Monday 7:30 pm	606,000 676,000	13 8	
3	"Task 3: Yum cha service" "Boardroom"	25 May 2021	Tuesday 7:30 pm	636,000 744,000	11 5	
4	"Task 4: Designer Swimwear" "Boardroom"	30 May 2021	Sunday 7:00 pm	738,000 854,000	4 3	
5	"Task 5: Boost Juice Stage Play" "Boardroom"	31 May 2021	Monday 7:30 pm	659,000 667,000	11 10	
6	"Task 6: Trash to Treasure" "Boardroom"	1 June 2021	Tuesday 7:30 pm	644,000 715,000	10 7	
7	"Task 7: Puppy Video" "Boardroom"	6 June 2021	Sunday 7:00 pm	710,000 854,000	4 3	
8	"Task 8: Koala pop-up store" "Boardroom"	7 June 2021	Monday 7:30 pm	656,000 697,000	10 7	
9	"Task 9: Madame Tussauds Sleepover Experience" "Boardroom"	8 June 2021	Tuesday 7:30 pm	654,000 710,000	8 6	
10	"Task 10: Ice Cream" "Boardroom"	13 June 2021	Sunday 7:00 pm	683,000 772,000	5 3	
11	"Task 11: Truckload Market" "Boardroom"	14 June 2021	Monday 7:30 pm	687,000 714,000	11 10	
12	"Final Task" "Winner Announced"	15 June 2021	Tuesday 7:30 pm	658,000 783,000	10 5	
