= The Celebrity Apprentice Australia =

Australian reality television series

- Genre: Reality
- Created by: Mark Burnett
- Based on: NBC: The Apprentice by Mark Burnett
- Presented by: Mark Bouris; Alan Sugar
- Starring: Dane Bouris; Deborah Thomas; Kerri-Anne Kennerley; Shelley Barrett; Lorna Jane Clarkson; Janine Allis; Nick Bell; Natasha Young
- Narrated by: Andrew Daddo; David Reyne
- Opening theme: "Are You with Me" by The Potbelleez (season 1–2); "For the Love of Money" by The O'Jays (season 3, 5)
- Country of origin: Australia
- Original language: English
- No. of seasons: 6
- No. of episodes: 74

Production
- Executive producers: Mark Burnett; Scot Cru
- Camera setup: Multi-camera
- Running time: 30—90 minutes
- Production companies: FremantleMedia Australia (seasons 1–4); Mark Burnett Productions (seasons 1–4); Warner Bros. International Television Production Australia (season 5)

Original release
- Network: Nine Network
- Release: 24 October 2011 – 18 November 2015
- Release: 23 May 2021 – 21 June 2022

Related
- The Apprentice Australia

The Celebrity Apprentice Australia is an Australian reality television series which aired on the Nine Network. Based on NBC's The Apprentice, it first aired on 24 October 2011 and originally featured Mark Bouris, the founder and chairman of Wizard Home Loans and Yellow Brick Road, as the chief executive officer (CEO).

In July 2020, Nine reportedly commissioned Warner Brothers Australia, current owners of the franchise, to make a new season of The Celebrity Apprentice for 2021, with former series CEO Mark Bouris not returning. In September 2020, Nine confirmed at their yearly upfronts that the series will officially return in 2021 with British business magnate and The Apprentice UK host and CEO, Lord Alan Sugar leading the series, along with the reveal of Michelle Bridges, Michael "Wippa" Wipfli and Olivia Vivian as some of the competing celebrities. On 12 October, Nine announced the full list of celebrities competing in the season. In the same month, Josh Gibson and Scherri-Lee Biggs were also announced as competing celebrities. The season premiered on 23 May 2021.

In September 2021, the series was renewed for a sixth season with Alan Sugar returning as CEO, and revealing Turia Pitt and Will & Woody as some of the competing celebrities. On 17 October 2021, Nine announced the full list of celebrities competing in the season.

In September 2022, the series was cancelled for the second time by Nine and won’t return in 2023.

== Timeline of personalities ==
Judges	Seasons					
Judges	1	2	3	4	5	6
Andrew Daddo	Narrator					
Mark Bouris	CEO	CEO	CEO	CEO		
Dan Bouris	Advisor	Advisor	Advisor			
Deborah Thomas	Advisor	Advisor	Advisor			
David Reyne		Narrator	Narrator	Narrator		
Kerri-Anne Kennerley				Advisor		
Shelley Barrett				Advisor		
Alan Sugar					CEO	CEO
Janine Allis					Advisor	Advisor
Lorna Jane Clarkson					Advisor	
Nick Bell						Advisor

== Series overview ==
Series	Episodes	Originally released		Winner	Runner-up
Series	Episodes	First released	Last released	Winner	Runner-up
1	19	24 October 2011	21 November 2011	Julia Morris, Team Ignite; National Breast Cancer Foundation (Australia), $200,750	Jason Coleman, Team Unity; The Song Room, $100,000
2	9	18 April 2012	16 May 2012	Ian "Dicko" Dickson, Team Platinum; Australian Children's Music Foundation, $204,253	Nathan Joliffe, Team Platinum; Epilepsy Australia, $80,000
3	9	30 April 2013	25 June 2013	Stephanie Rice, Team Supreme; The Heart Foundation, $181,750	John Steffensen, Team Fabulous; National Aboriginal Sporting Chance Academy, $40,000
4	10	16 September 2015	18 November 2015	Sophie Monk, Team Fearless; Make-A-Wish Foundation, $263,412	Tim Dormer, Team Dream Team; Australia Zoo Wildlife Warriors, $28,152
5	12	23 May 2021	15 June 2021	Shaynna Blaze, Team Momentum; Voice of Change, $489,000	Ross Noble, Team Fun-Raisers; Australian Red Cross Disaster Response and Recovery Fund, $103,500
6	16	22 May 2022	21 June 2022	Benji Marshall, Team Collaborate; Souths Cares, $547,105	Darren McMullen, Team Collaborate; Feel The Magic, $412,617

== Teams by season ==
Season	No. of tasks	Team Name	Overall record wins as a team	Apprentice Result
1	8	Unity	2	Losing Team
1	8	Ignite	6	Winning Team
2	8	Fortune	3	Losing Team
2	8	Platinum	5	Winning Team
3	9	Fabulous	4	Losing Team
3	9	Supreme	5	Winning Team
4	10	Dream Team	5	Losing Team
4	10	Fearless	5	Winning Team
5	11	Fun-Raisers	4	Losing Team
5	11	Momentum	7	Winning Team
6	16	Innovate	6	Losing Team
6	16	Collaborate	10	Winning Team

== Seasons ==
=== Season 1 (2011) ===
A celebrity version of the series began to air on the Nine Network on 24 October 2011. It was won by comedian Julia Morris, who beat choreographer and So You Think You Can Dance Australia judge Jason Coleman in the final Boardroom.

Celebrity	Charity	Result	Raised
Julia Morris	National Breast Cancer Foundation (Australia)	Winner (21 November 2011)	$200,750.35
Jason Coleman	The Song Room	Runner-up (21 November 2011)	$100,000
Jesinta Campbell	Reach Foundation	Fired in final task (21 November 2011)	$166,385
Shane Crawford	Breast Cancer Network Australia	Fired in final task (21 November 2011)	$49,310.81
Pauline Hanson	Assistance Dogs	Fired in task 7 (15 November 2011)	$20,000
Lisa Curry	The Heart Foundation	Fired in task 6 (9 November 2011)	$0
Didier Cohen	Youth Off The Streets	Fired in task 5 (8 November 2011)	$55,250
Max Markson	Variety, the Children's Charity	Fired in task 5 (8 November 2011)	$0
Wendell Sailor	Joanne Mackay Breast Cancer Foundation	Fired in task 4 (3 November 2011)	$0
Deni Hines	Oasis Africa Australia	Fired in task 3 (1 November 2011)	$47,400
Polly Porter	HeartKids Australia	Fired in task 2 (27 October 2011)	$0
Warwick Capper	Camp Quality	Fired in task 1 (25 October 2011)	$0

=== Season 2 (2012) ===
The second season of The Celebrity Apprentice Australia began to air on the Nine Network on 18 April 2012. It was eventually won by television and music industry personality Ian Dickson, who beat reality star Nathan Jolliffe in the final Boardroom.

Celebrity	Charity	Result	Raised
Ian "Dicko" Dickson	Australian Children's Music Foundation	Winner (16 May 2012)	$204,253
Nathan Joliffe	Epilepsy Australia	Runner-up (16 May 2012)	$80,000
Ben Dark	Brisbane Royal Children's Hospital	Fired in task 8 (10 May 2012)	$40,000
Lauryn Eagle	Bay City Care	Fired in task 8 (10 May 2012)	$0
Vince Sorrenti	The Cancer Council	Fired in task 7 (9 May 2012)	$0
Charlotte Dawson†	Smile Foundation	Fired in task 7 (9 May 2012)	$20,000
Jason Akermanis	Vicdeaf	Fired in task 6 (3 May 2012)	$152,000
Patti Newton	Sids and Kids	Fired in task 5 (2 May 2012)	$0
Tania Zaetta	Prostate Cancer Foundation of Australia	Fired in task 4 (26 April 2012)	$0
David Hasselhoff	Starlight Foundation	Quit in task 3 (25 April 2012)	$231,649
Marion Grasby	Save The Children	Fired in task 2 (19 April 2012)	$70,120
Fiona O'Loughlin	Angel Care	Fired in task 1 (18 April 2012)	$0

=== Season 3 (2013) ===
The third season of The Celebrity Apprentice Australia began to air on the Nine Network on 30 April 2013. It was won by Olympic Gold Champion Stephanie Rice, who beat fellow olympian John Steffensen in the final Boardroom.

Celebrity	Charity	Result	Raised
Stephanie Rice	The Heart Foundation	Winner (25 June 2013)	$181,750
John Steffensen	National Aboriginal Sporting Chance Academy	Runner-up (25 June 2013)	$40,000
Roxy Jacenko	Sydney Children's Hospital	Fired in task 9 (25 June 2013)	$40,000
Jeff Fenech	Save Our Sons	Fired in task 9 (25 June 2013)	$179,200
Dawn Fraser	Sunshine Coast Riding for the Disabled	Fired in task 8 (18 June 2013)	$60,000
Prue MacSween	Victor Chang Cardiac Research Institute	Fired in task 8 (18 June 2013)	$50,000
Layla Subritzky	Lifeline	Fired in task 7 (11 June 2013)	$5,000
Dermott Brereton	The Shane Warne Foundation	Fired in task 7 (11 June 2013)	$294,687.99
Peter Everett	Skin and Cancer Foundation	Fired in task 6 (4 June 2013)	$32,743.11
Rob Mills	The Reach Foundation	Fired in task 5 (28 May 2013)	$40,000
Kym Johnson	The Merry Makers	Fired in task 4 (21 May 2013)	$10,000
Brian Mannix	Prostate Cancer Foundation of Australia	Fired in task 3 (14 May 2013)	$10,000
Peter Berner	ChildFund Australia	Fired in task 2 (7 May 2013)	$10,000
Prinnie Stevens	Musicians Make a Difference	Fired in task 1 (30 April 2013)	$10,000

=== Season 4 (2015) ===
The fourth season of The Celebrity Apprentice Australia began airing on the Nine Network on 16 September 2015, following a one-year absence. Kerri-Anne Kennerley and Shelley Barrett replace Dane Bouris and Deborah Thomas as advisors. This season ends with Sophie Monk reigning supreme and defeating former Big Brother champion Tim Dormer in the final Boardroom.

Celebrity	Charity	Result	Raised
Sophie Monk	Make-A-Wish Foundation	Winner (18 November 2015)	$263,412
Tim Dormer	Australia Zoo Wildlife Warriors	Runner-up (18 November 2015)	$28,152
Matt Cooper	Sydney Children's Hospital Randwick	Fired in Task 9 (11 November 2015)	$20,000
Richard Reid	Foodbank Australia	Fired in Task 9 (11 November 2015)	$15,000
Mel Greig	Endometriosis Australia	Fired in Task 8 (4 November 2015)	$10,000
Tegan Martin	Sydney Children's Hospital Westmead (Metabolic Clinic)	Fired in Task 7 (28 October 2015)	$130,782
Gabi Grecko	The Gay and Lesbian Foundation of Australia	Fired in Tasks 1 & 6 (21 October 2015)	$0
James Mathison	Barnardos Australia	Fired in Task 5 (14 October 2015)	$25,000
Esther Anderson	Pink Hope	Fired in Task 4 (7 October 2015)	$0
Gina Liano	Cancer Council Victoria	Quit in Task 4 (7 October 2015)	$0
Geoffrey Edelsten†	Fight Cancer Foundation	Fired in Task 3 (30 September 2015)	$17,799
Blake Garvey	ReachOut Australia	Fired in Task 2 (23 September 2015)	$0

=== Season 5 (2021) ===
The fifth season of The Celebrity Apprentice Australia began airing on the Nine Network on 23 May 2021, following a six-year absence. The winning celebrity will receive $100,000 for their chosen charity. The season was won by Shaynna Blaze, who beat fellow celebrity Ross Noble in the final Boardroom.

Celebrity	Known For	Charity	Result	Raised
Shaynna Blaze	Interior Designer & The Block Judge	Voice of Change	Winner	$489,000
Ross Noble	British Comedian	Australian Red Cross - Disaster Response and Recovery Fund	Runner-up	$103,500
Martha Kalifatidis	Reality TV Contestant	Bully Zero	Fired in Task 11	$40,000
Josh Gibson	Australian Rules Footballer	My Room	Fired in Task 11	$20,000
Michael "Wippa" Wipfli	Radio Presenter & Comedian	Cooper Rice-Brading Foundation	Fired in Task 10	$184,500
Camilla Franks	Fashion Designer	National Breast Cancer Foundation	Fired in Task 9	$20,000
Scherri-Lee Biggs	Miss Universe Australia 2011	Dress For Success Perth	Fired in Task 8	$20,000
David Genat	Model & winner of Australian Survivor: All Stars	The Garvan Institute	Fired in Task 7	$20,000
The Veronicas	Pop Star Twins	The Brain Foundation	Fired in Task 6	$244,050
Michelle Bridges	Personal Trainer	Women’s Community Shelters	Fired in Task 6	$20,000
Anthony Callea	Singer	Children's Cancer Foundation	Fired in Task 4	$20,000
Olivia Vivian	Olympic Artistic Gymnast	Melanoma Institute Australia	Fired in Task 3	$0
Rob Shehadie	Actor & Comedian	Save Our Sons	Fired in Task 2	$0
Alex Hayes	Influencer & Surfer	Batyr	Fired in Task 1	$0

=== Season 6 (2022) ===
The sixth season of The Celebrity Apprentice Australia began airing on the Nine Network on 22 May 2022. The winning celebrity will receive $100,000 for their chosen charity. The season was won by Benji Marshall, who beat fellow celebrity Darren McMullen in the final Boardroom.

Celebrity	Known for	Charity	Result	Raised
Benji Marshall	NRL Champion	Souths Cares	Winner (21-06-2022)	$547,105
Darren McMullen	TV Host	Feel The Magic	Runner-up (21-06-2022)	$412,617
Ronnie Caceres	Reality TV star	Habitat for Humanity Australia	Fired in Task 15 (20-06-2022)	$0
Amy Shark	ARIA Award Winning Musician	Support Act	Fired in Task 15 (20-06-2022)	$20,000
Jean Kittson	Comedy Queen	Taldumande Youth Services	Fired in Task 14 (15-06-2022)	$20,000
Bronte Campbell	Olympic swimmer	Carers Australia	Fired in Task 13 (14-06-2022)	$60,000
Turia Pitt	Motivational Speaker	Interplast	Fired in Task 12 (13-06-2022)	$310,000
Beck Zemek	Married at First Sight bride	Royal Hospital for Women	Fired in Task 11 (07-06-2022)	$0
Beck Zemek	Married at First Sight bride	Royal Hospital for Women	Fired in Task 1 (22-05-2022)	$0
Carla from Bankstown/Ben James	Comedic Drag Queen	Twenty10	Fired in Task 10 (06-06-2022)	$40,000
Will & Woody	National Radio duo	Gotcha4life Foundation	Fired in Task 9 (05-06-2022)	$20,000
Eloni Vunakece	Former NRL player/ Ninja Warrior star	Headache Australia	Fired in Task 8 (01-06-2022)	$20,000
Eloni Vunakece	Former NRL player/ Ninja Warrior star	Headache Australia	Fired in Task 2 (23-05-2022)	$20,000
Samantha Jade	Singer/Songwriter	Cancer Council Australia	Fired in Task 7 (31-05-2022)	$0
Jarrod Scott	International Model	Citizens of the Great Barrier Reef	Fired in Task 6 (30-05-2022)	$0
Vince Colosimo	Award winning actor	Dementia Australia	Fired in Task 5 (29-05-2022)	$0
Gamble Breaux	Real Housewife	Animal Welfare League NSW	Fired in Task 4 (25-05-2022)	$0
Jodi Gordon	Soapstar	Starlight Children's Foundation	Fired in Task 3 (24-05-2022)	$0

== Ratings ==
Season	Episodes	Premiere			Finale					Average viewers (in millions)	Ref
Season	Episodes	Premiere date	Premiere ratings	Rank	Finale date	Finale ratings (Final Challenge)	Rank	Finale ratings (Final Boardroom)	Rank	Average viewers (in millions)	Ref
One	19	24 October 2011	1.052	8	21 November 2011	1.057	9	1.617	1	1.032	
Two	9	18 April 2012	0.859	10	10 May 2012	0.837	12	1.036	7	0.800	
Three	9	30 April 2013	0.866	10	25 June 2013	0.573	—N/a	0.653	18	0.752	
Four	10	16 September 2015	0.566	19	18 November 2015	0.638	18	—N/a		0.599	
Five	12	23 May 2021	0.748	4	15 June 2021	0.658	10	0.783	5	0.714	
Six	16	22 May 2022	0.404	8	21 June 2022	0.459	6	0.594	11	0.412	
