= The Celebrity Apprentice Australia season 2 =

The Celebrity Apprentice Australia
- Season 2
- Starring: Mark Bouris (CEO); Dane Bouris (advisor); Deborah Thomas (advisor)
- No. of contestants: 12
- Winner: Ian Dickson
- No. of episodes: 8

Release
- Original network: Nine Network
- Original release: 18 April – 16 May 2012

Season chronology
- ← Previous; Season 1 Next → Season 3

The second season of The Celebrity Apprentice Australia began airing on 18 April 2012 on the Nine Network. The series was commissioned in late 2011 following the popularity of the first celebrity season, and will be the third edition of The Apprentice Australia overall. The official cast was announced in January 2012, with filming beginning on 15 January 2012. Mark Bouris returned as CEO, with his son Dane replacing Brad Seymour as boardroom advisor, alongside Deborah Thomas. TV personality Ian "Dicko" Dickson was the celebrity winner, defeating reality star Nathan Jolliffe in the final boardroom.

== Candidates ==
Following the success of the first series it was reported that many Australian celebrities had expressed interest in participating in a second series of the show. Reports regarding the participation of Chopper Read, Nikki Webster, Kris Smith, Julie Goodwin and Stephen Belafonte as candidates failed to eventuate, with media reporting in early January 2012 that David Hasselhoff was set to appear in the series alongside former MasterChef Australia contestant Marion Grasby and The Amazing Race Australia winner Nathan Jolliffe, as well as other expected candidates including Ian Dickson and former Australian rules footballer Jason Akermanis. These celebrities were all confirmed as candidates on 16 January 2012, with the full line-up of participants also consisting of Patti Newton, Charlotte Dawson, Lauryn Eagle, Vince Sorrenti, Fiona O'Loughlin, Ben Dark and Tania Zaetta. It has also been confirmed that Hasselhoff will be raising money for Surf Life Saving Australia, while Newton and Dawson's chosen charities are SIDS for Kids and the Smile Foundation respectively.

Candidate	Background	Original team	Age	Charity	Result	Raised
Ian Dickson	Music Guru	Platinum	49	Australian Children's Music Foundation	Winner	$154,253
Nathan Joliffe	Reality Star	Platinum	25	Epilepsy Australia	Runner-Up	$30,000
Lauryn Eagle	Sportswoman	Fortune	23	Bay City Care	Fired in task 8 (10-05-2012)	
Ben Dark	TV Presenter	Platinum	40	Brisbane Royal Children's Hospital	Fired in task 8 (10-05-2012)	$40,000
Vince Sorrenti	Comic	Platinum	51	The Cancer Council	Fired in task 7 (09-05-2012)	
Charlotte Dawson	Australia's Next Top Model Judge	Fortune	46	Smile Foundation	Fired in task 7 (09-05-2012)	$20,000
Jason Akermanis	Former AFL Player	Platinum	36	Vicdeaf	Fired in task 6 (03-05-2012)	$152,000
Patti Newton	Entertainment Icon	Fortune	67	Sids and Kids	Fired in task 5 (02-05-2012)	
Tania Zaetta	Bollywood Actress	Fortune	42	Prostate Cancer Foundation of Australia	Fired in task 4 (26-04-2012)	
David Hasselhoff	American Actor	Platinum	59	Starlight Foundation	Quit in task 3 (25-04-2012)	$231,649
Marion Grasby	Celebrity Chef	Fortune	30	Save The Children	Fired in task 2 (19-04-2012)	$70,120
Fiona O'Loughlin	Comedienne	Fortune	49	Angel Care	Fired in task 1 (18-04-2012)	

== Weekly results ==
Candidate	Original team	Task 2 team	Task 3 team	Task 4 team	Task 5 team	Task 6 team	Task 7 team	Task 8 team	Application result	Record as project manager
Ian "Dicko" Dickson	Platinum	Platinum	Platinum	Fortune	Platinum	Platinum	Fortune	Fortune	The Celebrity Apprentice	1-1 (win in task 2, loss in task 6)
Nathan Joliffe	Platinum	Platinum	Platinum	Platinum	Platinum	Fortune	Platinum	Fortune	Fired in the final task	1-1 (win in task 6, loss in task 3)
Ben Dark	Platinum	Platinum	Fortune	Fortune	Platinum	Fortune	Platinum	Platinum	Fired in task 8	2-0 (win in tasks 5 & 7)
Lauryn Eagle	Fortune	Fortune	Fortune	Fortune	Fortune	Fortune	Platinum	Platinum	Fired in task 8	0-1 (loss in task 4)
Vince Sorrenti	Platinum	Platinum	Platinum	Platinum	Fortune	Fortune	Fortune		Fired in task 7	0-2 (loss in tasks 5 & 7)
Charlotte Dawson	Fortune	Fortune	Fortune	Platinum	Fortune	Platinum	Fortune		Fired in task 7	1-0 (win in task 3)
Jason Akermanis	Platinum	Platinum	Platinum	Platinum	Platinum	Platinum			Fired in task 6	1-0 (win in task 4)
Patti Newton	Fortune	Platinum	Fortune	Fortune	Fortune				Fired in task 5	
Tania Zaetta	Fortune	Fortune	Fortune	Fortune					Fired in task 4	0-1 (loss in task 1)
David Hasselhoff	Platinum	Fortune	Platinum						Quit in task 3	1-0 (win in task 1)
Marion Grasby	Fortune	Fortune							Fired in task 2	0-1 (loss in task 2)
Fiona O'Loughlin	Fortune								Fired in task 1	

No.	Candidate	Elimination chart								
No.	Candidate	1	2	3	4	5	6	7	8	
1	Dicko	IN	WIN	BR	IN	IN	LOSE	BR	IN	CA
2	Nathan	IN	IN	LOSE	IN	IN	WIN	IN	IN	FIRED
3	Ben	IN	IN	IN	IN	WIN	IN	WIN	FIRED	
4	Lauryn	BR	IN	IN	LOSE	IN	IN	IN	FIRED	
5	Vince	IN	IN	IN	IN	LOSE	IN	FIRED		
6	Charlotte	IN	IN	WIN	IN	BR	BR	FIRED		
7	Jason	IN	IN	BR	WIN	IN	FIRED			
8	Patti	IN	IN	IN	BR	FIRED				
9	Tania	LOSE	BR	IN	FIRED					
10	David	WIN	BR	QUIT						
11	Marion	IN	FIRED							
12	Fiona	FIRED								

The candidate was on the losing team.
The candidate won the competition and was named the Celebrity Apprentice.
The candidate won as project manager on his/her team.
The candidate lost as project manager on his/her team.
The candidate was brought to the final boardroom.
The candidate was fired.
The candidate lost as project manager and was fired.
The candidate quit the competition.

== Tasks ==
Unlike last season, the show aired 2 episodes a week and each episode had the challenge and the boardroom.

=== Task 1 ===
- Airdate: 18 April 2012 (Task & Boardroom)
- Fortune's Project manager: Tania Zaetta
- Platinum's Project manager: David Hasselhoff
- Task: To create and operate a celebrity dog washing and pampering experience.
- Winning team: Platinum
  - Reasons for victory: Team Platinum focused more on corporate dollars and high end donations. The price for a dog wash was set at $500, in order to earn more money whilst washing less dogs. David Hasslehoff was also able to promote the event and draw larger crowds.
- Losing team: Fortune
  - Reasons for loss: Despite many team members bringing in large donations, they did not bring in as much as the men. Additionally, the women set their wash prices much lower, as to not turn away the general public, a strategy that backfired, leaving them with more work and less money to show for it.
  - Sent to Boardroom: Tania Zaetta, Lauryn Eagle, Fiona O'Loughlin
- Fired: Fiona O'Loughlin- For bringing in the least amount of money. Despite her personality and drive to do well, Fiona relied solely on one donation that ended up falling through.
- Notes:
  - David Hasslehoff won $245,000 for his charity
  - During the challenge, Fiona approached David and asked him to donate 25% of the men's earnings to the women. David refused. It was later revealed in the boardroom that Project Manager Tania was unaware of this.
  - Lauryn also crossed over to the men's team in order to try and steal some of their waiting clients. Tania was unhappy that Lauryn was constantly away from the women's team and not working on their own clients.
  - Team Fortune was criticised in the boardroom for not using Patti's bigger celebrity status to combat David's.

=== Task 2 ===
- Airdate: 19 April 2012 (Task & Boardroom)
- Fortune's Project manager: Marion Grasby
- Platinum's Project manager: Ian "Dicko" Dickson
- Task: To create a pop-up shop in Sydney's infamous harbour side location, 'The Rocks' and raise money by auctioning off art. Each team member had to create a piece of art that represented a significant memory of their life, as well as a team artwork. $20,000 was also given to the team that offered the best experience on the day.
- Winner: Platinum
  - Reasons for victory: Team Platinum raised $134,253 in the auction. Additionally, the men were also judged as having the better experience, and won an extra $20,000.
- Losing team: Fortune
  - Reasons for loss: Team Fortune only managed to raise $70,120. Even if that had won the extra $20,000, it would still not be enough to beat the men.
  - Sent to Boardroom: Marion Grasby, David Hasselhoff, Tania Zaetta
- Fired: Marion Grasby - for being an unsuccessful Project manager. Even though the rest of the team believed that Tania should be fired, she had bought in the most money for the team for the second week in a row. Additionally, Marion was deemed as not having the harsher, more upfront personality to continue forward in the competition.
- Notes:
  - Ian "Dicko" Dickson raised $154,253 for his charity.
  - Patti and David swapped teams for this challenge at the request of Mr. Bouris.
  - Mr Bouris gave Dicko the opportunity to give the money Team Fortune had made back to them for Marion's Charity. He gladly accepted.
  - Initially, Ben Dark appeared to also want the title of project manager when choosing leaders, but eventually stepped aside after words with Dicko. Ben and Dicko continued to butt heads over the duration of the challenge.
  - Tania accused Lauryn of talking over Marion and the other team members during the boardroom. Both Lauryn and Charlotte denied this, and argued that it was Tania who talked over others.
  - Nathan was praised for bringing in large donations in consecutive challenges ($35,000 & $40,000).

=== Task 3 ===
- Airdate: 25 April 2012 (Task & Boardroom)
- Fortune's Project manager: Charlotte Dawson
- Platinum's Project manager: Nathan Joliffe
- Task: To run and perform in a hair show for Wella.
- Quit: David Hasselhoff- Due to family priorities.
- Winner: Fortune
- Losing team: Platinum
  - Sent to Boardroom: Nathan Joliffe, Ian "Dicko" Dickson, Jason Akermanis
- Fired: Nobody - Due to David's departure, Mr. Bouris decided that it was fair that all three stayed.
- Notes:
  - Initially the teams were swapped back to "Men" vs "Women". However at the request of Mr Bouris, Ben Dark was moved to team Fortune to even out the teams.
  - Charlotte Dawson won $20,000 for her charity.

=== Task 4 ===
- Airdate: 26 April 2012 (Task & Boardroom)
- Fortune's Project manager: Lauryn Eagle
- Platinum's Project manager: Jason Akermanis
- Task: To raise the most money by producing a family fun fair.
- Winner: Platinum
  - Reasons for victory: Platinum raised more money than Team Fortune.
- Losing team: Fortune
  - Reasons for loss: Although their fun fair was more popular and did run smoother, they didn't raise as much money as Team Platinum.
  - Sent to Boardroom: Lauryn Eagle, Tania Zaetta, Patti Newton
- Fired: Tania Zaetta- for raising the least amount of money and causing friction throughout the team.
- Notes:
  - Ian "Dicko" Dickson moved to team Fortune, while Charlotte Dawson was sent to team Platinum.
  - Jason Akermanis won $152,000 for his charity.
  - Warwick Capper made a surprise reappearance to even out the numbers of the teams, joining Team Platinum for this challenge only.

=== Task 5 ===
- Airdate: 2 May 2012 (Task & Boardroom)
- Fortune's Project manager: Vince Sorrenti
- Platinum's Project manager: Ben Dark
- Task: To make a publicity stunt for Yellow Brick Road to get across the message 'We Care'.
- Winner: Platinum
  - Reasons for victory:Their campaign, which involved sleeping in the street and presenting a booklet to Australian Prime Minister Julia Gillard gained a lot of attention and focused on the message "We Care"
- Losing team: Fortune
  - Reasons for loss: Although Team Fortune gained a lot of publicity, Mr Bouris felt as if they did not get across the message 'We Care'.
  - Sent to Boardroom: Vince Sorrenti, Patti Newton, Charlotte Dawson
- Fired: Patti Newton- for asking to be fired because she felt as if she could not bring anymore to the competition.
- Notes:
  - The Celebrities were placed back into their teams, however due to an uneven number the girls chose Vince Sorrenti to join team Fortune.

=== Task 6 ===
- Airdate: 3 May 2012 (Task & Boardroom)
- Fortune's Project manager: Nathan Joliffe
- Platinum's Project manager: Ian "Dicko" Dickson
- Task: To perform an act outlining the P&O Brand and participate in making 2 cabins with in an hour.
- Winner: Fortune
  - Reasons for victory: Team Fortune concentrated on the P&O brand message and stuck to the main points and did a better job in customer service process.
- Losing team: Platinum
  - Reasons for loss: Did not get the message across although the act was entertaining and only managed to clean one cabin.
  - Sent to Boardroom: Ian "Dicko" Dickson, Jason Akermanis, Charlotte Dawson
- Fired: Jason Akermanis- for being too much of a "Maverick" and being overconfident
- Notes:
- Lauryn and Nathan kissed as part of the performance
- When Jason was fired, he pushed his chair over and swore as he left the board room, having argued with Bouris about his decision

=== Task 7 ===
- Airdate: 9 May 2012 (Task & Boardroom)
- Fortune's Project manager: Vince Sorrenti
- Platinum's Project manager: Ben Dark
- Task To create a promotional event for the new BMW car.:
- Winner: Platinum
  - Reasons for victory: Their advert was felt to be more edgy and exciting.
- Losing team: Fortune
  - Sent to Boardroom: Ian "Dicko" Dickson, Vince Sorrenti, Charlotte Dawson
- Fired: Vince Sorrenti & Charlotte Dawson- Vince and Charlotte couldn't see how their promotional advertisement was wrong, whereas Dicko admitted to 'stuffing up'.
- Notes:" Double Elimination"

=== Task 8 (Finale) ===
==== Part 1 ====
- Airdate: 10 May 2012 (Task & Boardroom)
- Fortune's Project manager: None
- Platinum's Project manager: None
- Task: To record a charity single
- Winner: Fortune
- Losing team: Platinum
  - Reasons for loss:Their single was felt to be less commercially viable.
- Fired: Ben Dark & Lauryn Eagle- Simply they were eligible to be fired for being on the losing team
- Notes:

==== Part 2 ====
- Airdate: 16 May 2012 (Task, Boardroom & Winner Announced)
- Task: Ian and Nathan must create a music video for a version of the charity song they wrote in the previous episode.
- Winner: Ian "Dicko" Dickinson
- Runner-Up: Nathan Joliffe
- Notes:
- Each contestant got to choose three celebrities each from either this series or the previous one. Nathan chose Charlotte Dawson, Jason Akermanis and Didier Cohen. Dicko chose Patti Newton, Tania Zaetta and Jesinta Campbell

== Ratings ==
Episode		Airdate	Timeslot	Viewers (millions)	Night Rank	Source
1	"Ultimate Dog Pamper Experience" "Boardroom"	18 April 2012	Wednesday 8:30 pm	0.859 0.908	10 9	
2	"Pop Up Shop" "Boardroom"	19 April 2012	Thursday 8:30 pm	0.835 0.941	9 6	
3	"Hair Show" "Boardroom"	25 April 2012	Wednesday 8:30 pm	0.812 0.858	13 11	
4	"Celebrity Funfair" "Boardroom"	26 April 2012	Thursday 8:30 pm	0.783 0.917	9 6	
5	"The Buzz" "Boardroom"	2 May 2012	Wednesday 8:30 pm	0.841 0.815	11 12	
6	"Run a Tight Ship" "Boardroom"	3 May 2012	Thursday 8:30 pm	0.810 0.907	9 7	
7	"BMW 3 Series Print Advert" "Boardroom"	9 May 2012	Wednesday 8:30 pm	0.729 0.817	14 11	
8	"Charity Song" "Boardroom"	10 May 2012	Thursday 8:30 pm	0.686 0.719	10 9	
9	"Final Challenge" "Final Boardroom" "Winner Announced"	16 May 2012	Wednesday 8:30 pm	0.837 0.901 1.036	12 11 7	
