= The Celebrity Apprentice Australia season 1 =

The Celebrity Apprentice Australia
- Season 1
- Starring: Mark Bouris (CEO); Dane Bouris (advisor); Deborah Thomas (advisor)
- No. of contestants: 12
- Winner: Julia Morris
- No. of episodes: 19

Release
- Original network: Nine Network
- Original release: 24 October – 21 November 2011

Season chronology
- Next → Season 2

The Celebrity Apprentice Australia is a celebrity version of The Apprentice Australia series. It began to air on the Nine Network on 24 October 2011, with the founder and chairman of Wizard Home Loans, Mark Bouris, returning as the chief executive officer. Brad Seymore and Deborah Thomas acted as boardroom advisors. The series is narrated by Andrew Daddo. Comedian Julia Morris was the inaugural celebrity winner, defeating choreographer and So You Think You Can Dance Australia judge Jason Coleman in the final boardroom.

== Candidates ==
The following is the list of candidates for this season.

Candidate	Background	Original team	Age	Charity	Result	Raised
Julia Morris	Comedian	Ignite	43	National Breast Cancer Foundation	The Celebrity Apprentice (21-11-2011)	$200,750.35
Jason Coleman	Dance Guru	Unity	41	The Song Room	Fired in season finale (21-11-2011)	$100,000
Jesinta Campbell	Beauty Queen	Ignite	20	Reach Foundation	Fired in final task (21-11-2011)	$166,385
Shane Crawford	AFL Champion	Unity	37	Breast Cancer Network Australia	Fired in final task (21-11-2011)	$49,310.81
Pauline Hanson	Politician	Ignite	57	Assistance Dogs	Fired in task 7 (15-11-2011)	$20,000
Lisa Curry	Olympic Golden Girl	Ignite	49	The Heart Foundation	Fired in task 6 (09-11-2011)	$0
Didier Cohen	International Model	Unity	26	Youth Off The Streets	Fired in task 5 (08-11-2011)	$55,250
Max Markson	Agent to the Stars	Unity	50	Variety, the Children's Charity	Fired in task 5 (08-11-2011)	$0
Wendell Sailor	Footy Legend	Unity	37	Joanne Mackay Breast Cancer Foundation	Fired in task 4 (03-11-2011)	$0
Deni Hines	Pop Princess	Ignite	41	Oasis Africa Australia	Fired in task 3 (01-11-2011)	$47,400
Polly Porter	Reality Star	Ignite	27	HeartKids Australia	Fired in task 2 (27-10-2011)	$0
Warwick Capper	80's Icon	Unity	48	Camp Quality	Fired in task 1 (25-10-2011)	$0

== Weekly results ==
Candidate	Original team	Task 4 team	Task 5 team	Task 6 team	Task 7 team	Final task teams	Application result	Record as project manager
Julia Morris	Ignite	Ignite	Ignite	Ignite	Ignite	Ignite	The Celebrity Apprentice	2–0 (win in tasks 4 & 6)
Jason Coleman	Unity	Unity	Unity	Unity	Unity	Ignite	Fired in final task	0–2 (loss in tasks 5 & 7)
Jesinta Campbell	Ignite	Unity	Ignite	Ignite	Ignite	Unity	Fired in final task	1–0 (win in task 1)
Shane Crawford	Unity	Unity	Unity	Unity	Ignite	Unity	Fired in final task	2–0 (win in tasks 2 & 7)
Pauline Hanson	Ignite	Unity	Ignite	Ignite	Unity		Fired in task 7	1–1 (win in task 5, loss in task 2)
Lisa Curry	Ignite	Ignite	Ignite	Unity			Fired in task 6	0–1 (loss in task 6)
Didier Cohen	Unity	Ignite	Unity				Fired in task 5	1–0 (win in task 3)
Max Markson	Unity	Ignite	Unity				Fired in task 5	0–1 (loss in task 1)
Wendell Sailor	Unity	Unity					Fired in task 4	0–1 (loss in task 4)
Deni Hines	Ignite						Fired in task 3	0–1 (loss in task 3)
Polly Porter	Ignite						Fired in task 2	
Warwick Capper	Unity						Fired in task 1	

No.	Candidate	Elimination chart							
No.	Candidate	1	2	3	4	5	6	7	8
1	Julia	IN	IN	IN	WIN	IN	WIN	IN	CA
2	Jason	IN	IN	IN	BR	LOSE	BR	LOSE	FIRED
3	Jesinta	WIN	IN	IN	IN	IN	IN	IN	FIRED
4	Shane	IN	WIN	IN	IN	IN	BR	WIN	FIRED
5	Pauline	IN	LOSE	BR	BR	WIN	IN	FIRED	
6	Lisa	IN	IN	BR	IN	IN	FIRED		
7	Didier	IN	IN	WIN	IN	FIRED			
8	Max	LOSE	IN	IN	IN	FIRED			
9	Wendell	BR	IN	IN	FIRED				
10	Deni	IN	BR	FIRED					
11	Polly	IN	FIRED						
12	Warwick	FIRED							

The candidate was on the losing team.
The candidate won the competition and was named the Celebrity Apprentice.
The candidate won as project manager on his/her team.
The candidate lost as project manager on his/her team.
The candidate was brought to the final boardroom.
The candidate was fired.
The candidate lost as project manager and was fired.
The candidate was absent during the week due to previous engagements.

== Challenges ==
Unlike the original series showing one episode a week, including the final boardroom. The Celebrity Apprentice is aired five nights a week. In this show's format, the tasks were aired every Mondays and Wednesdays, the losing team's boardrooms (including the firing) were aired on Tuesdays and Thursdays, and the behind the scenes (including the celebrity giving a cheque to their chosen charity) were aired on Fridays.

=== Task 1 ===
Airdate: 24 October 2011 (Task) and 25 October 2011 (Boardroom)

Bouris' Babes Project Manager	Unity Project Manager
Jesinta Campbell	Max Markson
Task
Car Wash – each team has to operate a car wash service and the team that makes the most money wins.
Winning Team	Losing Team
Bouris' Babes	Unity
Reasons for victory	Reasons for loss
Bouris' Babes car wash offered a varying price range, allowing everyone to use their service. Their biggest sale came from men's fashion label aussieBum, who offered Pauline Hanson $50,000 to wash their car in aussieBum underwear, plus $10,000 for Deni Hines to sing the Australian National Anthem.	Max only focused on corporate dollars, turning away anyone who offered less than $1000. By the end of the day, there were no more high-end customers, resulting in the men offering to wash cars for as little as $25. Max's treatment towards the other candidates was also considered poor.
Sent to Final Boardroom
Max Markson, Warwick Capper, Wendell Sailor
Fired
Warwick Capper – for contributing the least amount of sales at $20, and for being seen as lazy by the rest of his team.
Notes
• At the boardroom, Mark Bouris, Brad Seymour and Deborah Thomas didn't approve of the women's team name by telling them how inappropriate and disrespectful it was to Mark Bouris. In the end, Bouris told the women's team to change their name to a more appropriate team name. • Before arriving at the women's carwash, the AussieBum car originally stopped at the men's carwash, but eventually left as the men were held up cleaning a large truck.

=== Task 2 ===
Airdate: 26 October 2011 (Task) and 27 October 2011 (Boardroom)

Ignite Project Manager	Unity Project Manager
Pauline Hanson	Shane Crawford
Task
KFC – each team has to work at a KFC for three hours. The team that makes the most money in sales and donations wins.
Winning Team	Losing Team
Unity	Ignite
Reasons for victory	Reasons for loss
Though business started out slow, sales and donations eventually picked up when Wendell Sailor started attracting rugby players to their restaurant. In addition they won a bonus $5,000.	Despite an initial rush of customers, business faded towards the end of the challenge.
Sent to Final Boardroom
Pauline Hanson, Deni Hines, Polly Porter
Fired
Polly Porter – Mr. Bouris felt that she did not utilise her large social media following to her advantage.
Notes
• Deni and Polly had a heated confrontation on the day of the challenge. Polly confronted Deni on her attitude towards her, after Deni repeatedly criticised her status as a 'celebrity' and her short time in the industry.

=== Task 3 ===
Airdate: 31 October 2011 (Task) and 1 November 2011 (Boardroom)

Ignite Project Manager	Unity Project Manager
Deni Hines	Didier Cohen
Task
Charity Art Auction- Each team has to create two individual artworks and a group artwork, and run a charity art auction.
Result
Ignite's group work was a print of the women's hands arranged in a circle. The men, as suggested by Jason, posed nude with tophats covering their crotches for their group work.
Winning Team	Losing Team
Unity	Ignite
Reasons for victory	Reasons for loss
The men raised $55,250, just short of $8000 more than the women did at their auction.	The women could only manage to raise $47,400 at their auction.
Sent to Final Boardroom
Deni Hines, Lisa Curry & Pauline Hanson
Fired
Deni Hines- despite raising the most money on their team, Hines was unanimously considered a below-average leader by her teammates.
Notes
• Wendell accidentally packed one of his works into the women's truck, resulting in it ending up at the women's gallery. Although Deni wanted to keep it, Pauline insisted that it be returned. • Jason Coleman was absent from the auction due to previous commitments. • After both Deni and Didier spoke so passionately about their charities in the boardroom, Mr. Bouris offered them to keep all money raised for their own charity. Both accepted this offer. • Julia Morris was awarded $20,000 to her charity for creating works that best fit the theme of 'Beautifully Simple'. • This is the last time that Unity won a task.

=== Task 4 ===
Airdate: 2 November 2011 (Task) and 3 November 2011 (Boardroom)

Ignite Project Manager	Unity Project Manager
Julia Morris	Wendell Sailor
Team Reshuffle
Didier and Max move to Ignite. Jesinta and Pauline move to Unity.
Task
Photoboard – each team had to create an underwater-themed photoboard and raise money from photo sales.
Winning Team	Losing Team
Ignite	Unity
Reasons for victory	Reasons for loss
Though their photoboard was considered less impressive than that of Unity, Team ignite raised $22,876. Some of their money came from various corporates as well as from the photoboard.	Despite having a more popular photoboard, Team Unity only raised $17,874. The team didn't focus on getting money from corporates and mostly from the photoboard. Even so, some of the members sold less than they should have.
Sent to Final Boardroom
Wendell Sailor, Jason Coleman & Pauline Hanson
Fired
Wendell Sailor – for relying too heavily on Jason, despite being team leader, and for not utilising corporate donations.
Notes
• Team Unity focused on an underwater theme for their photoboard and grabbed most of the props and costumes to fit with their theme. Team Ignite had to settle for a Hawaiian theme. • During the challenge, Max stole a cheque from Jason worth $5,000 and never gave it back to Unity. At the boardroom, Julia had the cheque (not banked) and offered team Unity the cheque. Wendell accepted it without thanks, believing it was theirs from the start and deserved it. • Shane Crawford was absent during the boardroom due to a prior commitment.

=== Task 5 ===
Airdate: 7 November 2011 (Task) and 8 November 2011 (Boardroom)

Ignite Project Manager	Unity Project Manager
Pauline Hanson	Jason Coleman
Team Reshuffle
Unity (Didier, Jason, Max, and Shane) vs. Ignite (Jesinta, Julia, Pauline and Warwick filling in for Lisa Curry)
Task
Fashion Show – the teams had to create a spring themed Grazia Magazine fashion show featuring two team members and other models.
Winning Team	Losing Team
Ignite	Unity
Reasons for victory	Reasons for loss
Ignite's show was more 'stylish' and more suited to Grazia magazine content.	Though their show was praised for being 'theatrical' the team was criticised for some of their clothing choices and also not having correct shoe sizes suitable for the models.
Sent to Final Boardroom
Jason Coleman, Didier Cohen & Max Markson
Fired
Didier Cohen and Max Markson – both were fired as Mr. Bouris felt they were not 'game changers' this challenge, and for deferring to Project Manager Jason despite himself making bad decisions.
Notes
• Lisa Curry did not participate due to a previous engagement. • Warwick Capper made a once-off reappearance to fill in for Lisa in Team Ignite. • The contestants were all put back into their original teams (men vs. women) this challenge. • Mr. Bouris had previously decided to fire two of the contestants. • When stating his case to stay, Max gave reason to fire Didier because he was a 'self-confessed cocaine addict'. This was taken from an interview in the paper in which Didier talked about his life as a youth in Los Angeles. Both Didier and Jason were visibly upset by this remark.

=== Task 6 ===
Airdate: 9 November 2011 (Task and Boardroom)

Ignite Project Manager	Unity Project Manager
Julia Morris	Lisa Curry
Team Reshuffle
Lisa Curry moved to Team Unity to even out the teams
Task
P&O Cruises – Create a 'living' billboard for P&O Cruises promoting the idea of a 'short-break' three-day cruise
Winning Team	Losing Team
Ignite	Unity
Reasons for victory	Reasons for loss
Ignite's billboard was deemed as more fitting with the brief, and the team managed to keep a large crowd throughout the challenge.	Despite being praised for their billboard design, team Unity's presentation was seen a flat and less fitting with the brief. Additionally, they struggled to draw a crowd to their presentation.
Sent to Final Boardroom
Lisa Curry, Jason Coleman & Shane Crawford
Fired
Lisa Curry – for being unable to manage Jason, despite being Project Manager and having prior experience with P&O Cruises.
Notes
• Lisa was unexpectedly called away on the first day of the challenge, forcing her to communicate with her team over the phone only. • Pauline and Julia clashed constantly over props and design elements of the billboard. • Lisa strongly felt that Jason was setting her up to fail by over-complicating matters throughout the challenge. Jason denied this. • Julia won her second challenge of the competition, making her the first celebrity to do so.

=== Task 7 ===
Airdate: 14 November 2011 (Task) and 15 November 2011 (Boardroom)

Ignite Project Manager	Unity Project Manager
Shane Crawford	Jason Coleman
Team Reshuffle
Shane Crawford moved to Team Ignite and Pauline Hanson moved to Team Unity
Task
School Play- each team have to create a play for a group of seven-year-old school children, which included a nursery rhyme or song.
Winning Team	Losing Team
Ignite	Unity
Reasons for victory	Reasons for loss
Team Ignite used their props well and grabbed the children's attention by getting them involved in the story.	Team Unity didn't get all the props they wanted such as the hats. During the play, a few puns they made were not well made like Absolutree (absolutely) and Tree years old (three years old). Their sing a long was called "Thing a thong" which was deemed inappropriate (according to the adults) or confusing. In addition, Jason told the children to be quiet, which some of the children thought he was rude to them.
Sent to Final Boardroom
Jason Coleman & Pauline Hanson
Fired
Pauline Hanson – Jason was seen to be a more stronger competitor than Pauline for the final challenge.
Notes
• Mr. Bouris had organised for some 'surprise celebrities' to come in so each team had four people- Catrina Rowntree came in to help Team Ignite and Jonathan Coleman and Lara Bingle came in to help Team Unity. • Target sponsored the task and donated $20,000 to the winning project manager's charity. • Jason Coleman is the only project manager to have lost twice and still in the process. • This is Jason Coleman's fourth time consecutive appearance in the final board room, the longest streak by any candidate in the series. • This is Julia Morris's fourth consecutive task win, the longest streak by any candidate in the series.

=== Task 8 (Finale) ===
Airdate: 16 November 2011 (Final Task) & 21 November 2011 (Final Task, boardroom and winner announcement)

Ignite Project Manager	Unity Project Manager
None
Team Reshuffle
Jesinta & Shane moved over to Team Unity, and Jason moved over to team Ignite.
Task
Yellow Brick Road Event – To create a print ad, event, and commercial for Mark Bouris' company Yellow Brick Road
Winning Team	Losing Team
Ignite	Unity
Reasons for victory	Reasons for loss
Unknown	Despite Team Unity's posters were better than Team Ignite's (according to Mark Bouris), Team Unity forgot to put the phone number for Yellow Brick Road.
Sent to Final Boardroom
None
Fired
Jesinta, Shane and Jason
Celebrity Apprentice
Julia Morris
Notes
• Polly, Max, Deni and Didier were brought back to help in the final task. Team Unity chose Didier and Deni, and Team Ignite chose Polly & Max. • This was the first time in the Australian series that there were no project managers in a task. • The losing team would be automatically fired, and the winning team would battle it out in the boardroom for the title of The Celebrity Apprentice and $100,000 for their charity. • This is Julia Morris's fifth consecutive task win, the longest winning streak by any candidate in the Australian series. • When Julia won (after thanking everyone) she asked to have the money split 50/50 between herself and Jason for their charities. Mr Bouris agreed and promised the $50,000 would soon be delivered.

== Reception ==
=== Ratings ===
Week	Episode		Airdate	Timeslot	Viewers (millions)	Night Rank	Source
1	1	"Launch / Celebrity Challenge #1"	24 October 2011	Monday 7:00 pm–7:30 pm Monday 7:30 pm–8:00 pm	1.052 1.325	8 4	
1	2	"Boardroom and... 'You're Fired' #1"	25 October 2011	Tuesday 7:00 pm–7:30 pm	1.080	5	
1	3	"Celebrity Challenge #2"	26 October 2011	Wednesday 7:00 pm–7:30 pm Wednesday 7:30 pm–8:30 pm	0.911 1.278	8 1	
1	4	"Boardroom and... 'You're Fired' #2"	27 October 2011	Thursday 7:00 pm–7:30 pm	0.911	6	
1	5	"All Fired Up #1"	28 October 2011	Friday 7:00 pm–7:30 pm	0.589	10	
2	6	"Celebrity Challenge #3"	31 October 2011	Monday 7:00 pm–7:30 pm Monday 7:30 pm–8:00 pm	0.963 1.229	9 2	
2	7	"Boardroom and... 'You're Fired' #3"	1 November 2011	Tuesday 7:00 pm–7:30 pm	0.963	13	
2	8	"Celebrity Challenge #4"	2 November 2011	Wednesday 7:00 pm–7:30 pm Wednesday 7:30 pm–8:30 pm	0.888 1.128	10 2	
2	9	"Boardroom and... 'You're Fired' #4"	3 November 2011	Thursday 7:00 pm–7:30 pm	0.927	6	
2	10	"All Fired Up #2"	4 November 2011	Friday 7:00 pm–7:30 pm	0.564	11	
3	11	"Celebrity Challenge #5"	7 November 2011	Monday 7:00 pm–7:30 pm Monday 7:30 pm–8:00 pm	1.089 1.351	6 1	
3	12	"Boardroom and... 'You're Fired' #5"	8 November 2011	Tuesday 7:00 pm–7:30 pm	1.044	7	
3	13	"Celebrity Challenge No. 6 / Boardroom and... 'You're Fired' #6"	9 November 2011	Wednesday 7:00 pm–7:30 pm Wednesday 7:30 pm–8:30 pm	0.974 1.252	8 1	
3	14	"All Fired Up #3"	11 November 2011	Friday 7:00 pm–7:30 pm	0.444	17	
4	15	"Celebrity Challenge #7"^{[e]}^{[f]}	14 November 2011	Monday 7:00 pm–7:30 pm Monday 7:30 pm–8:00 pm	1.062 1.250	6 3	
4	16	"Boardroom and... 'You're Fired' #7"^{[g]}	15 November 2011	Tuesday 7:00 pm–7:30 pm	0.995	6	
4	17	"Celebrity Challenge #8"^{[h]}^{[i]}	16 November 2011	Wednesday 7:00 pm–7:30 pm Wednesday 7:30 pm–8:30 pm	1.006 1.119	6 2	
4	18	"All Fired Up #4"	18 November 2011	Friday 7:00 pm–7:30 pm	0.559	9	
5	19^{[j]}	"Challenge" "Boardroom"^{[k]} "Winner Announced"^{[l]}	21 November 2011	Monday 7:00 pm–8:30 pm	1.057 1.312 1.617	9 4 1	

== Notes ==
- ^{a} Upon the disapproval of Mr. Bouris, the female team changed their team name from "Bouris' Babes" to "Ignite" following the first challenge.
- ^{b} Lisa was absent from the fifth challenge due to previous engagements, therefore she replaced in the challenge by fired contestant Warwick.
- ^{c} Didier and Max were fired simultaneously in the boardroom following the fifth challenge, and with no difference in challenge wins, Didier's success as project manager in the third challenge places him higher than Max's failure as project manager in the first challenge.
- ^{d} Shane and Jesinta were fired simultaneously in the boardroom following the eighth challenge, with Jesinta's four challenge wins placing her higher than Shane's three wins.
- ^{e} In overnight figures, the rankings for the "Monday" segment of "Celebrity Challenge #7" (7:00 pm–7:30 pm approx.) in the three target demographics were as follows: 25–54 (#4), 18–49 (#4) and 16–39 (#4).
- ^{f} In overnight figures, the rankings for the "Challenge" segment of "Celebrity Challenge #7" (7:30 pm–8:00 pm approx.) in the three target demographics were as follows: 25–54 (#3), 18–49 (#3) and 16–39 (#3).
- ^{g} In overnight figures, the rankings for "Boardroom and... 'You're Fired' #7" in the three target demographics were as follows: 25–54 (#4), 18–49 (#5) and 16–39 (#4).
- ^{h} In overnight figures, the rankings for the "Wednesday" segment of "Celebrity Challenge #8" (7:00 pm–7:30 pm approx.) in the three target demographics were as follows: 25–54 (#5), 18–49 (#5) and 16–39 (#5).
- ^{i} In overnight figures, the rankings for the "Challenge" segment of "Celebrity Challenge #8" (7:30 pm–8:30 pm approx.) in the three target demographics were as follows: 25–54 (#2), 18–49 (#2) and 16–39 (#1).
- ^{j} The "Grand Final" episode, which aired on 21 November 2011, was split into three parts: "Challenge", "Boardroom" and "Winner Announced".
- ^{k} In overnight figures, the rankings for the "Boardroom" segment of the "Grand Final" episode in the three target demographics were as follows: 25–54 (#5), 18–49 (#5) and 16–39 (#5).
- ^{l} In overnight figures, the rankings for the "Winner Announced" segment of the "Grand Final" episode in the three target demographics were as follows: 25–54 (#1), 18–49 (#1) and 16–39 (#1).
