= Shelley Sullivan =

Australian entrepreneur and businesswoman (born 1973)

- Born: 1973
- Other name: Shelley Barrett
- Occupations: Entrepreneur, businesswoman
- Children: 2
- Awards: Young Entrepreneur (2005); Retail Executive of the Year (2017); AFR Women in Leadership – Retail (2024)

Shelley Sullivan (née Williams; formerly Barrett; born 1973) is an Australian entrepreneur and businesswoman, best known as the founder and former chief executive of the cosmetics brands ModelCo and MCoBeauty. She began her career in modelling and talent management before launching ModelCo in 2002, which grew to more than 3,000 stores across 27 countries. In 2020 she founded MCoBeauty, which within five years became the best-selling cosmetics brand in Australia and also New Zealand. Sullivan sold the company to DBG Health in two phases, in 2022 and 2025, the second at a valuation of more than A$1 billion, following which she stepped down as CEO. She then signed with Creative Artists Agency (CAA), where she advises on brand strategy and partnerships.

== Early life ==
Sullivan was born in 1973 and began organising children's parties at the age of 16, and was still running it in 1993 when she took a job as a receptionist at a model management agency. AFter 10 months, she left to open her own agency, with initial funding from her mother, Kerrie Martin.

The agency grew from a single model to a roster of more than 1,800 before Sullivan sold it to Artist and Entertainment Group.

== Career ==
=== ModelCo ===
Sullivan founded ModelCo in 2001, , inspired by conversations with models, makeup artists and stylists about beauty products they wanted but could not find. The brand launched in May 2002 with the Lash Wand, a heated eyelash curler, followed by Tan in a Can, an aerosol self-tanning spray that offered an alternative to the creams and lotions then already common in the space.After the launch of Tan in a Can, ModelCo expanded internationally and within five years, its products were stocked in more than 3,000 stores across 27 countries, with Sephora among its US retailers and Urban Outfitters among its later stockists. Sullivan and Karl Lagerfeld launched the Karl Lagerfeld + ModelCo collection in 2018. Elle Macpherson,, Hailey Bieber, Dannii Minogue and Rosie Huntington-Whiteley appeared in campaigns for ModelCo.

=== MCoBeauty ===
In 2020, Sullivan established MCoBeauty with six products. Positioned as luxe for less she secured distribution through supermarkets and pharmacies such as Woolworths, Big W and Chemist Warehouse. The company recorded $10 million AUD in sales in its first year.

In 2022, Sullivan sold a 50 per cent stake in MCoBeauty to DBG Health, owned by Dennis Bastas.

MCoBeauty expanded into the United States in 2024 and Canada in 2026. MCoBeauty also ran a campaign featuring Celeste Barber.

In February 2025, Sullivan sold her remaining 50 per cent stake to DBG Health in a deal that valued MCoBeauty at more than A$1 billion. She stepped down as chief executive. At the time of the sale, MCoBeauty was the best-selling cosmetics brand in Australia and New Zealand.

=== Creative Artists Agency ===
After stepping down as the CEO of MCoBeauty, Sullivan signed with Creative Artists Agency signed with Creative Artists Agency (CAA).CAA partnered with Sullivan as she expanded her work in the global beauty industry. She also works with CAA in pursuing new business ventures such as joint ventures and investment opportunities. Additionally she advises global brands and high-end talent on brand strategy, partnerships and brand transactions.

== Awards ==
2005: Young Entrepreneur of the Year, Ernst & Young Entrepreneur of the Year Awards

2017: Retail Executive of the Year, The CEO Magazine Executive of the Year Awards

2024: Retail category winner, Australian Financial Review Women in Leadership Awards

== Public speaking ==
Sullivan speaks regularly at conferences, including the Fortuna One Summit where she spoke alongside Tony Robbins, Steven Bartlett and Kayla Itsines.

== Television ==
In 2015, Sullivan appeared in the fourth season of The Celebrity Apprentice Australia as one of Mark Bouris' two boardroom advisers, along with Kerri-Anne Kennerley.

== Personal life ==
Sullivan married her high school boyfriend, Damien Barrett. They have two daughters, Lucy and Emily. In 2016, she married Anthony Sullivan and they separated in 2024. She is represented by Nick Fordham.
