= Patti Newton =

Australian entertainer (born February 4 1945)

Patti Newton AM
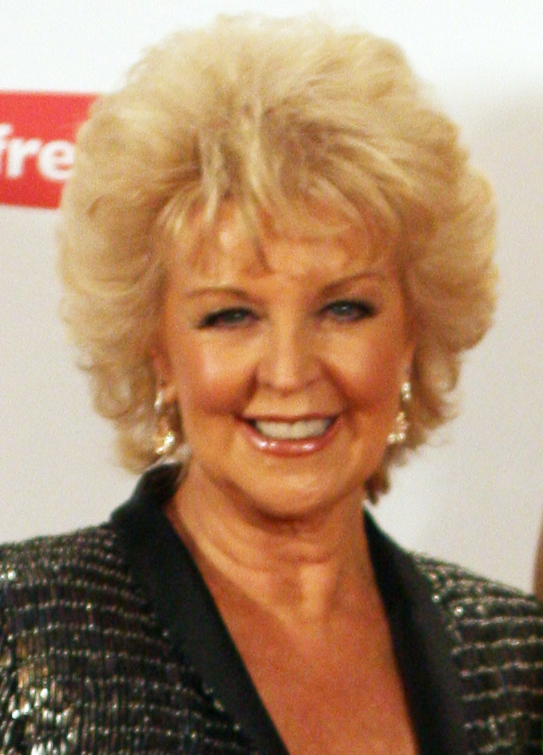
- Newton at the 2011 Logie Awards
- Born: Patricia Anne McGrath; 4 February 1945 (age 81)
- Occupations: Singer; actress; dancer; stage performer; radio and television personality
- Years active: 1957−present
- Spouse: Bert Newton (m. 1974; died 2021)
- Children: 2, including Matthew

Patricia Anne Newton AM (née McGrath) is an Australian singer, actress, dancer, stage performer and radio and television presenter.

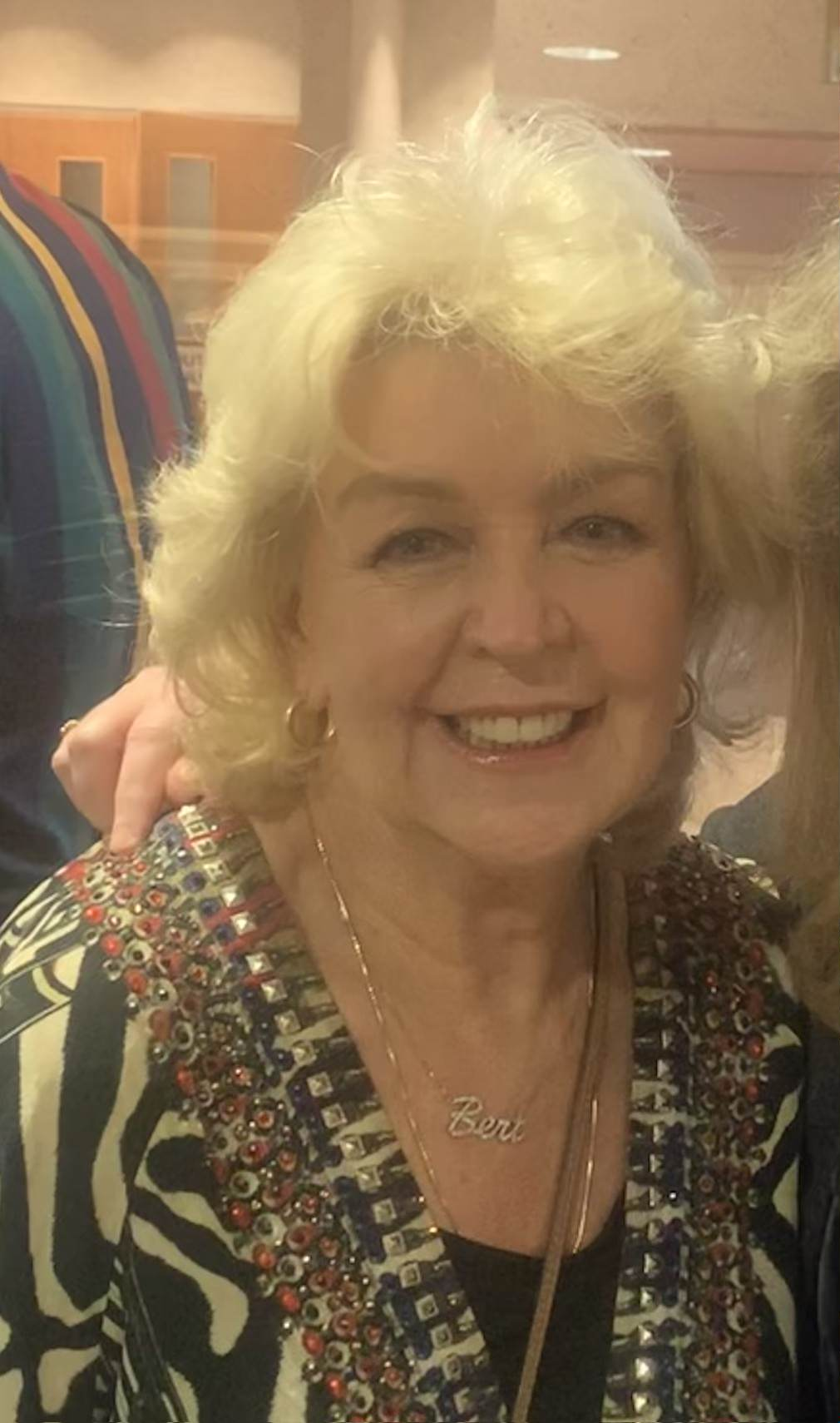

== Life and career ==
Newton prior to her marriage worked under her birth name, Patti McGrath, when she appeared on programs such as the Tarax Show and The Graham Kennedy Show. In 1967, she won the Logie Award for Most Popular Female in Victoria. She has appeared in many stage shows and has made television appearances on Good Morning Australia and the Logie Awards.

Newton was married to fellow Australian entertainer Bert Newton.

Newton is a regular on 3AW's Nightline program with Philip Brady and Simon Owens on Monday nights from 10.15 pm – 11.00 pm AEST.

In 2007, Newton was a contestant on Dancing with the Stars and Deal or No Deal.

On 16 May 2008, Newton was robbed at Chadstone Shopping Centre in suburban Melbourne while she was at a café. A bag containing a diary, cash, and jewellery inherited from her mother was stolen. Some items were recovered days later, and two people were charged over the theft. In 2018, she appeared on Who Do You Think You Are?

In 2012, Newton was one of the 12 celebrities to take part in season two of The Celebrity Apprentice Australia. She was "fired" after task 5, which involved the team on which she was part (Team Fortune) taking part in a semi-nude publicity stunt for the We Care charity. She effectively chose to leave when she requested to be the one who was fired.

Newton made a guest appearance in Neighbours as Valerie Grundy on 21 December 2018.

== Discography ==
=== Studio albums ===
Title	Album details
The Bert & Patti Family Album (with Bert Newton)	Released: 1977; Format: LP; Label: Pisces Records (L 27027)

== Filmography ==
=== Actress ===
Year	Title	Role
1957	The Tarax Show (TV series)	billed as Patti McGrath
1970	Hans Christian Andersen (TV movie)	The Shepherdess
1972	The Graham Kennedy Show (TV series)	herself
1989	Sugar and Spice (TV series)	Freddo's Mother
2013	The Wiggles: Go Santa Go! (video)	Mrs. Claus
2018	Neighbours (TV series)	Valerie Grundy

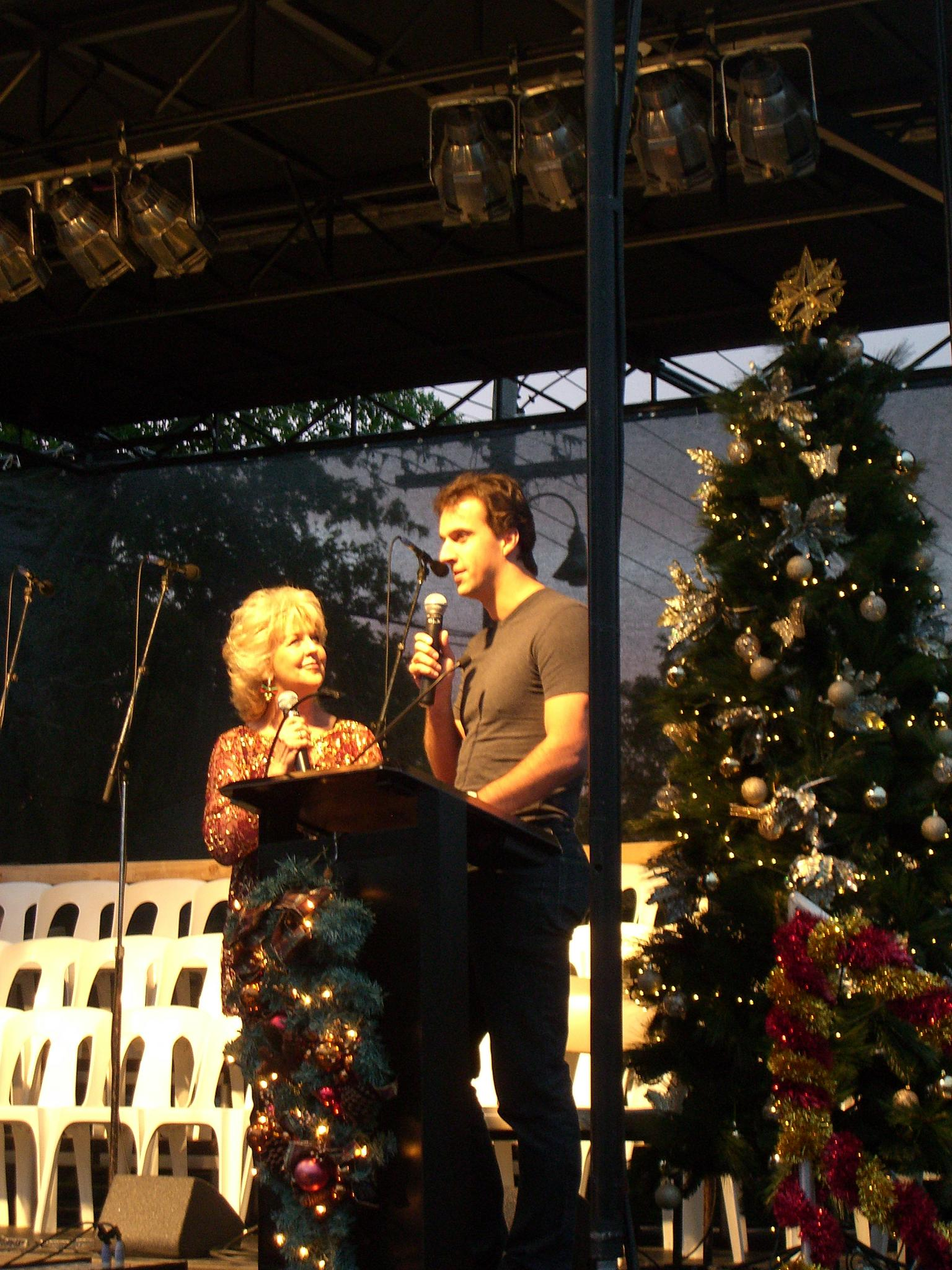
Patti Newton with son-in-law Matt Welsh at Carols By Candlelight in 2008

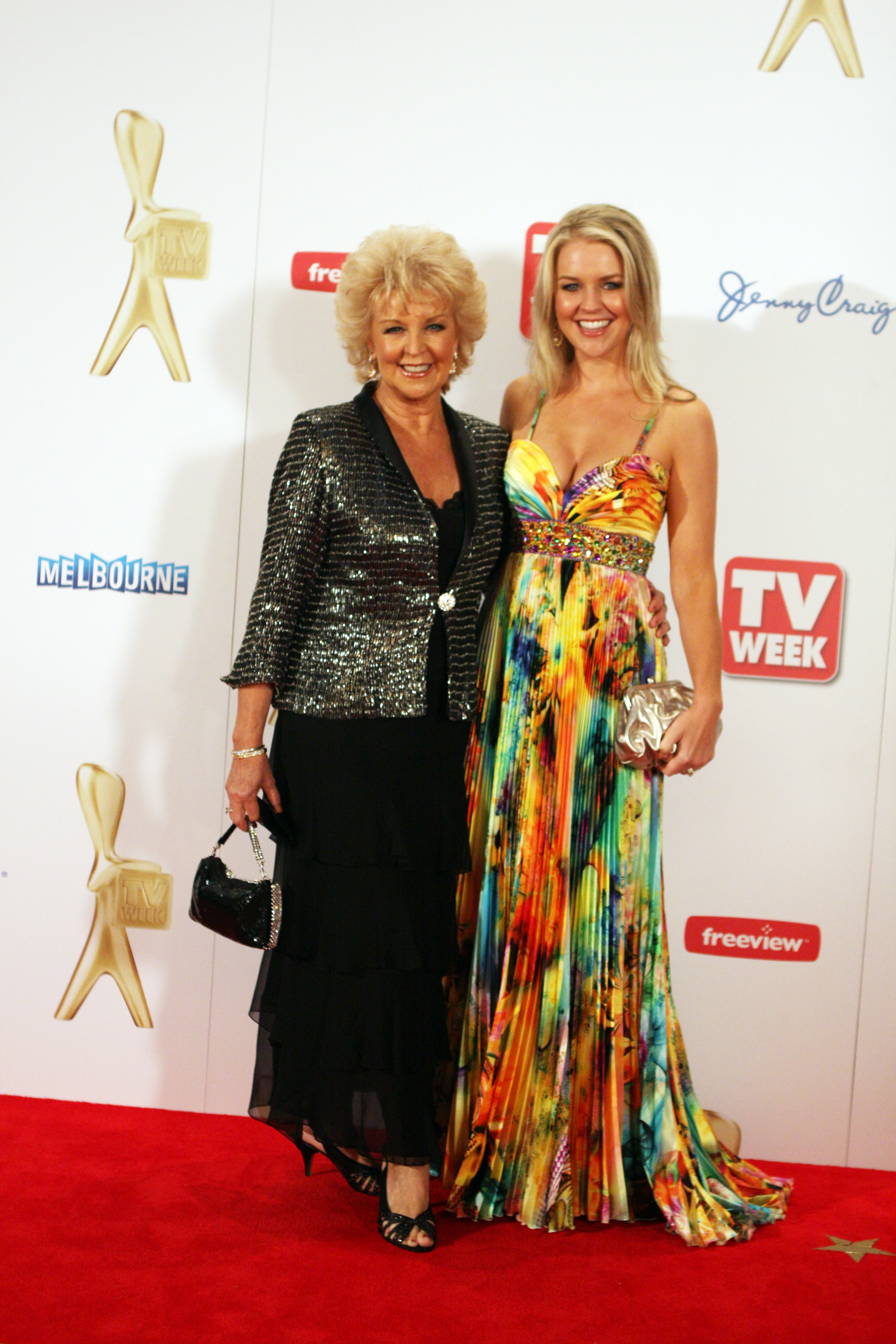
Patti with daughter Lauren at Logie Awards

=== Showbiz appearances ===
Year	Title	Role
1957	Swallow's Juniors (TV series)	herself as Patti McGrath
1966	Bandstand (TV series)	herself as singer (as Patti McGrath)
1969–1970	In Melbourne Tonight (IMT)	herself as Patti McGrath
1974	Ted Hamilton's Musical World (TV series)	herself
1974–1975	The Graham Kennedy Show (TV series)	herself
1974–1975	The Ernie Sigley Show (TV series)	herself
1975	Celebrity Squares (TV series)	herself as celebrity contestant
1981	The James Pegler Show (TV series)	herself as guest
1981	Ford Superquiz (TV series)	herself as host
2005	Australia Unites: Reach Out to Asia (TV movie)	herself
2004–2005	Good Morning Australia (TV series)	herself/performer
2006	Postcards (TV series)	herself as celebrity guest
2006	Lou Dobbs Tonight (TV series)	guest
2006	20 to 1 (TV series documentary)	herself as commentary
2007	The 2007 TV Week Logie Awards (TV special)	herself
2006–2007	Berts Family Feud (TV series)	as celebrity model/audience member
2007	Deal or No Deal (TV series)	herself
2007	Dancing with the Stars (TV series)	herself as celebrity contestant
2009	Australia Unites: The Victorian Bushfire Appeal	appears as herself
2009	Shaun Micallef's New Year's Rave (TV series)	herself
2010	Spicks and Specks (TV series)	celebrity contestant
2010	Talkin' Bout Your Generation (TV series)	guest
2012	The Celebrity Apprentice Australia (TV series)	herself team fortune
