= Fiona O'Loughlin (comedian) =

Australian comedian (born 1963)

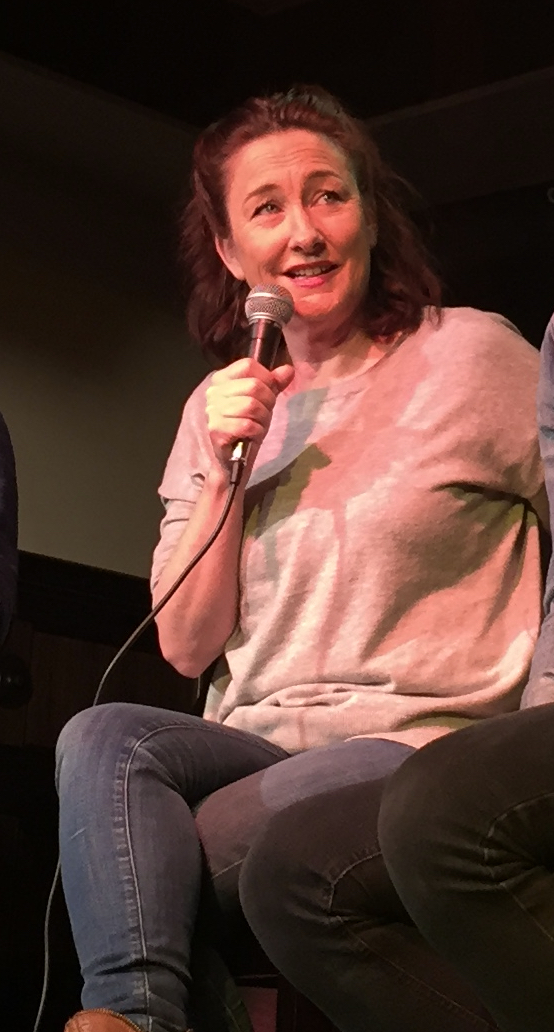
- Live at The Little Dum Dum Club podcast recording 12 November 2016.
- Born: Fiona Taheny; 16 July 1963 (age 63); Warooka, South Australia, Australia
- Spouse: Chris O'Loughlin (m. 1985–2012)
- Children: Five
- Relatives: Emily Taheny (sister)

Comedy career
- Years active: 2000–present
- Medium: Stand-up comedy, television
- Subjects: Family, marriage, storytelling

Fiona Taheny (born 16 July 1963), commonly known as Fiona O'Loughlin, is an Australian comedian. O'Loughlin has made television performances on ABC TV's Spicks and Specks, and Network Ten's Rove Live, Good News Week, All Star Family Feud, The Project, Studio 10, Show Me the Movie! and Hughesy, We Have a Problem and a series of advertisements for Heinz soups. She has performed as a headline act in the Melbourne International Comedy Festival and the Edinburgh Fringe festival. In 2011 a book of her short stories, Me of the Never Never: The (Chaotic) Life and Times of Fiona O'Loughlin was published by Hachette Australia.

== Career ==
In the early 1990s O'Loughlin was writing a column for the Centralian Advocate, and emceeing cabaret shows at the Araluen Arts Centre. By 1994 she was doing a weekly radio segment on the ABC. In 2000 she appeared at the Adelaide Fringe Festival.

In 2001, she won the award for Best Newcomer at the Melbourne International Comedy Festival with her show, Fiona and her sister (and some weird guy).

In 2007, she was the "funny woman" in the Seven Network's Sunrise.

In 2009, she was a contestant on the Australian version of Dancing with the Stars.

In 2012, O'Loughlin was a candidate on the second series of The Celebrity Apprentice Australia; she was the first to be fired from the series.

In 2014, she appeared on the ABC TV’s Australian Story discussing her career and her alcoholism.

In 2018, she was a contestant on fourth season of the Australian version of I'm a Celebrity...Get Me Out of Here!. She won the series and donated the prize of $100,000 to her chosen charity, Angel Flight. In 2018, she appeared as herself in the comedy film That's Not My Dog! She appeared as a guest quiz master on Have You Been Paying Attention?

In 2021, O'Loughlin appeared as a guest on episode #23 of Riley Dyson’s Aussies with Stories! podcast. O'Loughlin appeared as leader of the negative team on Australia Debates.

== Personal life ==
Fiona Taheny was born into an Irish-Australian family at Warooka, South Australia, and is herself a single mother of five children. She lived in Alice Springs for 27 years but relocated to Melbourne in 2012. She was married to Chris O'Loughlin from 1985-2012. Her family, and attitude towards children, make up a large component of her act.

In 2009, O'Loughlin collapsed during a performance in Brisbane. She subsequently announced that she suffers from alcoholism.

Her younger sister, Emily Taheny, is also a comedian and formerly a regular cast member of Comedy Inc. O'Loughlin's daughter, Biddy O'Loughlin, is a comedian, and toured Ireland in 2011–12.
