= Tania Zaetta =

Australian actress and television presenter

- Born: 17 November 1970 (age 56); Merbein, Victoria, Australia
- Occupations: Actress, television presenter, radio host, author
- Years active: 1992−present
- Height: 172 cm (5 ft 8 in)

Tania Zaetta (born 17 November 1970) is an Australian actress, television and radio presenter.

== Early life ==
Zaetta was born to an Italian father and an Australian mother, and is the granddaughter of amateur botanist James Howard Browne. She spent the earlier years of her life living in Merbein, Victoria. There, her family interests were in a local brick manufacturing business.

Tania is the cousin of Julia Zaetta, editor of Better Homes and Gardens.

== Career ==
From 1992 through 1994, Zaetta co-starred alongside Ian Turpie in the Australian version of Supermarket Sweep.

From 1996 until 1998, Zaetta co-hosted the Seven Network adventure-show, Who Dares Wins, alongside Mike Whitney.

In 1999, Zaetta landed one of the six supporting roles opposite David Hasselhoff as Kendra the triathlete, in the short-lived Australian edition of Baywatch.

In the 2000s, she had a supporting role in the Australian television series Pizza.

Zaetta co-hosted Mission Implausible, Britain's Sky1 prime-time show, with Jason Plato, which found both hosts competing against each other in a series of challenges each week.

Zaetta also hosted a series of TV specials in New York on The Great Outdoor Games for American sports network ESPN, and in San Francisco to host TV specials for the 2000 Summer X Games.

On 1 August 2008, Zaetta was confirmed by the Geelong Advertiser to co-star in a planned feature film to be shot entirely in Geelong called The Ninja. The film was slated to start shooting in 2010, with a cast including Rob Baard, John Schneider, Roger Cross, John Wesley Shipp and Jeremy Kewley.

Zaetta was on The Blue Planet, Network Ten's lifestyle/travel show. She also competed in season three of the Australian installment of Dancing with the Stars.

In April 2010, Zaetta commenced filming on the Sunshine Coast for a movie called Just Like U. In May 2011, Sydney-based author, Amanda Cole, issued Who Needs Prince Charming?, a self-realisation book for women, which collated contributions from 35 Australian women including Zaetta, Bianca Dye, Camilla Franks, Kathryn Eisman, Molly Contogeorge and Cindy Pan.

In 2012, Tania Zaetta was one of 12 celebrities who participated in Season 2 of The Celebrity Apprentice Australia. She was the third celebrity of the series fired by Mr. Bouris.

=== Bollywood ===
Her first step into the Bollywood limelight was in Bunty Aur Babli in 2005, before winning a support role in Salaam Namaste which was shot in Melbourne, Australia later that same year.

Dil Apna Punjabi gave Zaetta the chance to work with Harbhajan Mann in 2006.

Zaetta's fourth film Mr. White Mr. Black was released worldwide in 2008. The character saw her as a Charlie's Angels-style action girl in pursuit of stolen diamonds while being chased by criminals. This required her to learn fight sequences and perform wire work to display flying somersaults and mid-air kickboxing manoeuvres.

=== Health & Fitness ===
Zaetta has released an online program aimed at building a better body through Pilates training, and authored the book Trim & Tone with Tania in 2015.

== Charity, Peace for the Children ==
Zaetta co-founded a charity, Peace for the Children, with Grant Hilton. The Office of Fair Trading launched an investigation in March 2011 after it was revealed 'Peace for the Children' was not a registered charity, and audit of the charity by 'IPS Audit' showed it had directed less than a quarter of its income towards charitable projects, with the majority of the donations being used to cover costs. On 7 June Tania was cleared of the allegations she collected donations through her unregistered charity, Peace for the Children.

== Australian Defence Force tour controversy ==
Zaetta toured Australian Defence Force bases in Afghanistan and Iraq during early 2008 with a group of entertainers including 12 members of the Royal Australian Navy's band, Angry Anderson, The Wolverines, and others. After the tour, accusations arose in the media that Zaetta had engaged in sexual relations with one of the Australian Special Air Service Regiment (SASR). This was quickly denied by Zaetta and members of the touring group. The following day, an unreserved apology was given by the Department of Defence. In September 2009, the dispute was settled out of court with Zaetta for an undisclosed sum.

== Celebrity Apprentice ==
In 2012, Zaetta appeared in Celebrity Apprentice alongside her former Baywatch star David Hasselhoff. She was the third person "fired" from the show, but was able to raise over $70,000 for charity before her departure.

== Personal life ==
In September 2018, Zaetta and partner Chris Rogers had twin children following IVF. She was 48 years old at the time.

== Author and business ventures ==
In 2015, Zaetta authored her book Trim & Tone with Tania, published by New Holland Publishers. The book is a fitness, nutrition and lifestyle guide that incorporates her personal nutrition and Pilates exercise programs.

Zaetta is a qualified natural beauty therapist, holding a CIDESCO International Diploma, and is a certified Pilates and Barre Pilates instructor. She operates the Tania Zaetta Program, an online Pilates and weight loss program.

== Radio career ==
In 2024, Zaetta joined Gold Coast community station 94.1FM as a presenter, hosting a Saturday morning program from 9:00 am to 12:00 pm. The show features celebrity interviews, music from the 1970s to the 1990s, and segments focused on Gold Coast lifestyle content.

In March 2026, Zaetta joined The Breeze 100.6 FM and Breeze 92.1 FM hosting The Saturday Morning Show broadcasting across the Gold Coast, Logan and Brisbane. In addition to on‑air duties, she will represent the stations at major local events and participate in community engagement activities.
