= Josh Gibson (footballer) =

Australian rules footballer (born 1984)

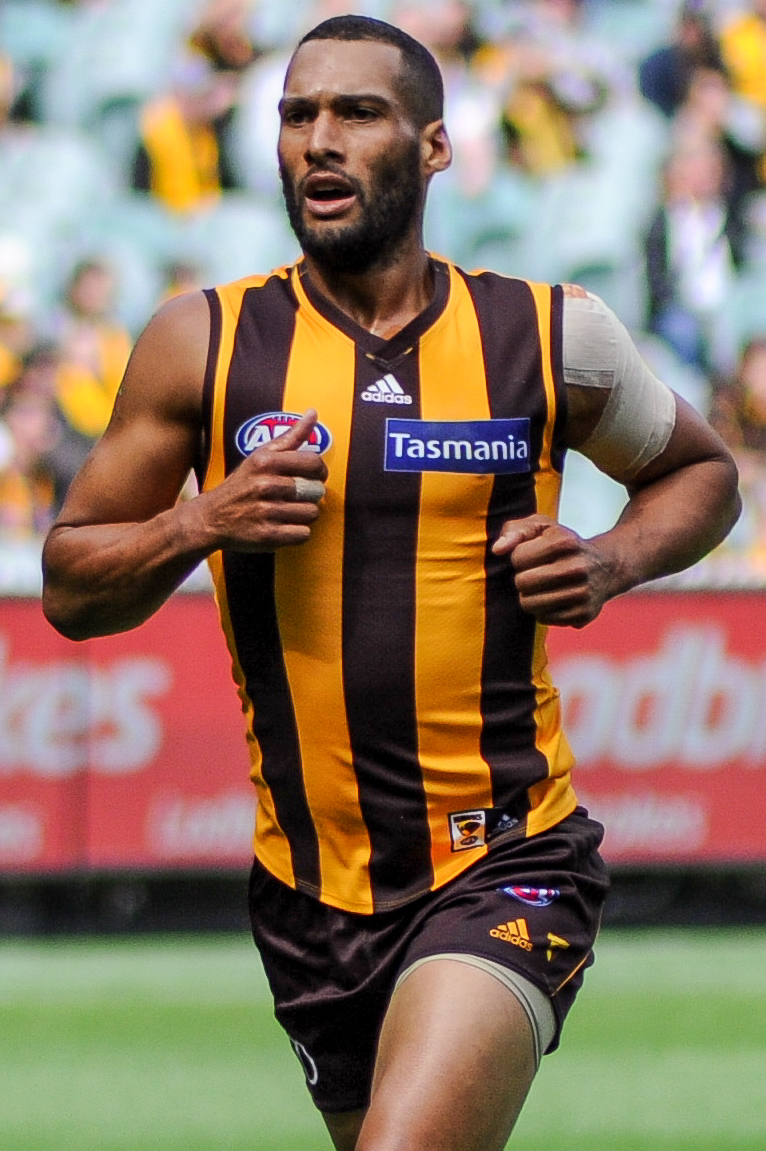
- Gibson in April 2017

Personal information
- Full name: Joshua Gibson
- Nickname: Gibbo
- Born: 13 March 1984 (age 42); Melbourne, Victoria
- Original team: Port Melbourne (VFL)
- Draft: No. 7, 2005 rookie draft
- Debut: Round 1, 2006, Kangaroos vs. Port Adelaide, at AAMI Stadium
- Height: 189 cm (6 ft 2 in)
- Weight: 93 kg (205 lb)
- Position: Defender

Playing career^{1}
Years	Club	Games (Goals)
2005–2009	North Melbourne	65 (2)
2010–2017	Hawthorn	160 (3)
Total		225 (5)
- ^{1} Playing statistics correct to the end of 2017.

Career highlights
- 3× AFL premiership player: 2013–2015; All-Australian team: 2015; 2× Peter Crimmins Medal: 2013, 2015

Joshua Gibson (born 13 March 1984) is a former Australian rules football player who played for the North Melbourne Football Club and Hawthorn Football Club in the Australian Football League. He is a member of Hawthorn's 2013, 2014 and 2015 premiership winning teams, winning the Peter Crimmins Medal in both 2013 and 2015 premiership seasons. Gibson was known for his spoiling prowess down back and holds the record for most one percenters in AFL history.

== Early life ==
Gibson was born and raised in Blackburn, Victoria. He attended Trinity Grammar School in Kew.

== Playing career ==
=== Early career ===
Gibson began playing football with Surrey Park and played junior football for East Burwood, before moving on to play for the Oakleigh Chargers in the TAC Cup and Victorian Football League side Port Melbourne. Gibson was recruited from Port Melbourne Football Club in the Victorian Football League (VFL) and drafted onto the Kangaroos (North Melbourne) rookie list in 2006.

=== North Melbourne (Kangaroos) ===
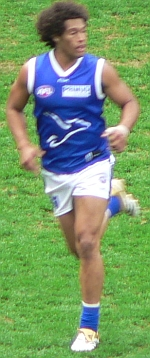
Josh Gibson playing for North Melbourne in 2006.

Gibson played 10 matches with the Kangaroos in 2006. On 3 June 2007, he suffered a head injury in the bathroom at his home as he was preparing for training. After initially being ruled out of football for the remainder of the season, he returned to the AFL in round 22 and was able to shut out Lance Franklin who had kicked seven goals the previous round.

=== Hawthorn ===
Immediately after the 2009 season, Gibson requested to be traded to the Hawthorn Football Club. The deal was done early on the first day of the 2009 trade week, with Gibson traded, along with North Melbourne's fifth-round draft pick No. 69 (Hawks picked Taylor Duryea) for Hawthorn's second and third-round draft picks (No. 25 and No. 41 overall). Gibson had a season interrupted by injury in 2010; he tore his hamstring in the third round but recovered to play 12 games. He played in every game in 2011, holding the backline together after longterm injuries to key backmen Ben Stratton and Stephen Gilham. In 2013, Gibson won the Hawthorn best and fairest award, the Peter Crimmins Medal. He won his second Peter Crimmins medal in 2015. Coming off his third consecutive premiership with Hawthorn, Gibson starred in the club's first home game of 2016, ending the match with an equal-club record 44 disposals in a victory over the West Coast Eagles. On 15 August 2017, he announced his retirement from the AFL at the conclusion of the 2017 season.

== Coaching career ==
=== North Melbourne ===
On 15 December 2022, it was announced that Gibson returned to the North Melbourne Football Club as a part-time assistant coach in the role of defence specialist coach supporting fellow assistant coach John Blakey who is overseeing the defence under senior coach Alastair Clarkson.

== Statistics ==
Legend
G	Goals	K	Kicks	D	Disposals	T	Tackles
B	Behinds	H	Handballs	M	Marks
#	Played in that season's premiership team	†	Led the league for the season

Season	Team	No.	Games	Totals							Averages (per game)							Votes
Season	Team	No.	Games	G	B	K	H	D	M	T	G	B	K	H	D	M	T	Votes
2006	Kangaroos	38	11	0	2	73	68	141	32	24	0.0	0.2	6.6	6.2	12.8	2.9	2.2	0
2007	Kangaroos	38	12	0	0	69	86	155	37	18	0.0	0.0	5.8	7.2	12.9	3.1	1.5	0
2008	North Melbourne	38	20	1	1	133	145	278	75	32	0.1	0.1	6.7	7.3	13.9	3.8	1.6	0
2009	North Melbourne	38	22	1	2	210	173	383	102	71	0.0	0.1	9.5	7.9	17.4	4.6	3.2	4
2010	Hawthorn	6	12	0	0	75	106	181	39	24	0.0	0.0	6.3	8.8	15.1	3.3	2.0	0
2011	Hawthorn	6	25	0	0	248	185	433	134	56	0.0	0.0	9.9	7.4	17.3	5.4	2.2	4
2012	Hawthorn	6	22	0	0	195	158	353	108	47	0.0	0.0	8.9	7.2	16.0	4.9	2.1	3
2013^{#}	Hawthorn	6	24	0	0	204	232	436	113	46	0.0	0.0	8.5	9.7	18.2	4.7	1.9	2
2014^{#}	Hawthorn	6	17	0	0	190	169	359	102	34	0.0	0.0	11.2	9.9	21.1	6.0	2.0	3
2015^{#}	Hawthorn	6	25	0	3	303	244	547	207^{†}	38	0.0	0.1	12.1	9.8	21.9	8.3	1.0	1
2016	Hawthorn	6	23	3	0	227	236	463	150	65	0.1	0.0	9.9	10.3	20.1	6.5	2.8	10
2017	Hawthorn	6	12	0	0	90	96	186	53	14	0.0	0.0	7.5	8.0	15.5	6.5	1.2	0
Career			225	5	8	2017	1898	3915	1152	469	0.0	0.0	9.0	8.4	17.4	5.1	2.1	27

== Honours and achievements ==
Team

- 3× AFL premiership player (Hawthorn): 2013, 2014, 2015
- 2× Minor premiership (Hawthorn): 2012, 2013

Individual

- All-Australian team: 2015
- 2× Peter Crimmins Medal: 2013, 2015
- Hawthorn most consistent player: 2011
- Hawthorn best player in finals: 2011
- Hawthorn life member

== Post-football career ==
In January 2018, Gibson was a celebrity contestant on the fourth season of the Australian version of I'm a Celebrity...Get Me Out of Here. He revealed his struggle with obsessive–compulsive disorder (OCD). On 5 March 2018, Gibson was evicted after 38 days in camp, coming in eighth place.

In 2018, he was a panelist on Sports Tonight.

In October 2020, Gibson was announced as a celebrity contestant on the new season of The Celebrity Apprentice Australia in 2021.

== Personal life ==
Gibson has direct links to Barbados, where his father was born.

Gibson has a child that was born in 2021.
