= Ben Dark =

Australian broadcaster

- Born: 14 January 1972 (age 54); Stanthorpe, Queensland, Australia
- Occupations: Radio & television presenter
- Years active: 1994−2010
- Spouse: Paula Reid
- Children: Digger & Daisy

Benjamin Cranstoun Dark (born 14 January 1972) is an Australian radio and television presenter.

== Career ==
In 1994, Dark started at Brisbane radio station B105 and worked for two-and-a-half years conducting on-air stunts under the pseudonym The Bush Pig. These stunts included ambushing press conferences and asking questions on behalf the B105 breakfast show Jamie Dunn and the Morning Crew.

In 1999, Ben joined Getaway as a reporter and remained with the show until 2010.

In 2012, Dark appeared on The Celebrity Apprentice Australia.

== Personal life ==
Dark was born on 14 January 1972, he spent the first 11 years of his life on his parents' property in Stanthorpe, south-east Queensland.

In 1984, Dark was sent to all boys Anglican boarding school, The Southport School, located on Gold Coast. He then spent his time roving around the Queensland outback on horses and motorbikes, through shearing sheds and stock camps, where he mustered cattle and saddled horses.
