= The Apprentice Australia =

Television series

- Genre: Reality
- Created by: Mark Burnett
- Starring: Mark Bouris (CEO)
- Narrated by: Andrew Daddo; Brad Seymour (advisor); Diane Stone (advisor)
- Country of origin: Australia
- Original language: English
- No. of seasons: 1
- No. of episodes: 10

Production
- Producer: FremantleMedia Australia
- Running time: 60-minute episodes (90 min. premiere)

Original release
- Network: Nine Network
- Release: 28 September – 23 November 2009

Related
- The Apprentice; The Celebrity Apprentice Australia

The Apprentice Australia is an Australian reality television series which aired on the Nine Network. It was based on NBC's The Apprentice. It first aired on 28 September 2009 and last aired on 23 November 2009, and features Mark Bouris, the founder and chairman of Wizard Home Loans and Yellow Brick Road, as the chief executive officer (CEO). It is narrated by Andrew Daddo, and the series' winner received a one-year employment contract worth $200,000 at a job managing Bouris' newest business venture, Yellow Brick Road.

== Candidates ==
Candidate	Background	Original team	Age	Hometown	Result
Andrew "Morello" Morello	Auctioneer	Pinnacle	23	Melbourne	Hired by Bouris
Heather Williams	Advertising Sales Consultant	Eventus	31	Maylands, Western Australia	Fired 2nd in Finale
Gavin McInnes	Lawyer	Pinnacle	33	Brisbane, Queensland	Fired 1st in Finale
Mary-Anne Lowe	Business Owner	Eventus	30	Melbourne	Fired in week 9
Sabrina Houssami	University Student and Miss World Australia 2006	Eventus	23	Sydney	Fired in week 8
Samuel "Sam" Hooper	Law Student	Pinnacle	19	Adelaide, South Australia	Fired in week 7
Carmen Parnos	Bankrupt. Former Entrepreneur	Eventus	44	Melbourne	Fired in week 6
John van Yzerloo	Unemployed	Pinnacle	44	Romsey, Victoria	Fired in week 5
Blake Chandler	Customer Service Manager	Pinnacle	28	Central Coast, New South Wales	Fired in week 4
Amy Cato	Business Owner	Eventus	25	Adelaide, South Australia	Fired in week 3
Lynton Pipkorn	Marketing Consultant	Pinnacle	30	Melbourne	Fired in week 2
Jane Barclay	Unemployed	Eventus	54	Sydney	Fired in week 1

== Weekly results ==
Candidate	Original team	Week 3 team	Week 4 team	Week 6 team	Week 7 team	Week 9 team	Final task team	Application result	Record as project manager
Andrew "Morello" Morello	Pinnacle	Pinnacle	Pinnacle	Pinnacle	Pinnacle	Eventus	Pinnacle	Hired by Bouris	2–0 (win in weeks 1 & 8)
Heather Williams	Eventus	Eventus	Eventus	Pinnacle	Eventus	Pinnacle	Eventus	Fired 2nd in Finale	1–1 (win in week 6, loss in week 4)
Gavin McInnes	Pinnacle	Eventus	Eventus	Eventus	Pinnacle	Pinnacle		Fired 1st in Finale	2–1 (win in weeks 3 & 9, loss in week 7)
Mary-Anne Lowe	Eventus	Eventus	Pinnacle	Eventus	Eventus	Eventus		Fired in week 9	1–2 (win in week 4, loss in weeks 8 & 9)
Sabrina Houssami	Eventus	Eventus	Pinnacle	Pinnacle	Eventus			Fired in week 8	2–0 (win in weeks 2 & 7)
Samuel "Sam" Hooper	Pinnacle	Pinnacle	Eventus	Eventus	Pinnacle			Fired in week 7	1–0 (win in week 5)
Carmen Parnos	Eventus	Eventus	Eventus	Eventus				Fired in week 6	0–2 (loss in weeks 1 & 6)
John van Yzerloo	Pinnacle	Pinnacle	Pinnacle					Fired in week 5	0–1 (loss in week 5)
Blake Chandler	Pinnacle	Pinnacle	Eventus					Fired in week 4	
Amy Cato	Eventus	Pinnacle						Fired in week 3	0–1 (loss in week 3)
Lynton Pipkorn	Pinnacle							Fired in week 2	0–1 (loss in week 2)
Jane Barclay	Eventus							Fired in week 1	

Elimination table
No.	Candidate	1	2	3	4	5	6	7	8	9	10	
1	Morello	WIN	IN	BR	IN	IN	IN	BR	WIN	BR	IN	HIRED
2	Heather	IN	IN	IN	LOSE	IN	WIN	IN	BR	IN	IN	FIRED
3	Gavin	IN	IN	WIN	BR	IN	BR	LOSE	IN	WIN	FIRED	
4	Mary-Anne	IN	IN	IN	WIN	BR	IN	IN	LOSE	FIRED		
5	Sabrina	BR	WIN	IN	IN	BR	IN	WIN	FIRED			
6	Sam	IN	BR	BR	IN	WIN	IN	FIRED				
7	Carmen	LOSE	IN	IN	IN	IN	FIRED					
8	John	IN	BR	IN	IN	FIRED						
9	Blake	IN	IN	IN	FIRED							
10	Amy	IN	IN	FIRED								
11	Lynton	IN	FIRED									
12	Jane	FIRED										

The candidate was on the winning team.
The candidate was on the losing team.
The candidate was hired and won the competition.
The candidate won as project manager on his/her team.
The candidate lost as project manager on his/her team.
The candidate was brought to the final boardroom.
The candidate was fired.
The candidate lost as project manager and was fired.

== Challenges ==
=== Week 1 ===
- Project managers: Carmen ('Eventus') and Morello ('Pinnacle')
- Task: Operate a premier gardening service and secure commercial and residential contracts.
- Result: Pinnacle made a $1700 profit against Eventus's $1100. While Pinnacle had problems with their time management and was forced to cancel their residential bookings, Eventus undersold several of their contracts and were warned that an attempt to reneg on the tasks they had agreed to do at one booking was unprofessional.
- Winner: Pinnacle
- Reward: Spa day at The Observatory Hotel
- Brought into the boardroom: Carmen, Sabrina, Jane
- Fired: Jane, for failing to defend herself against criticism brought by her teammates in the Boardroom, and for not speaking up against what she saw as errors in Carmen's leadership.

=== Week 2 ===
- Project managers: Sabrina ('Eventus') and Lynton ('Pinnacle')
- Task: Create a brand for a children's cereal (including tagline, logo, product box, costumed mascot and advertising jingle) and present a successful pitch to marketing executives at Ogilvy Advertising.
- Result: While both teams created successful brands, Eventus won due to presenting a pitch with greater energy and team involvement, while Pinnacle's pitch was seen as flat and unengaging.
- Winner: Eventus
- Reward: Cocktails and dinner at the Ivy Hotel with a corporate public speaker.
- Brought into the boardroom: Lynton, John, Sam
- Fired: Lynton, for being too controlling and delivering a poor quality presentation, in which he forgot the name of a key panellist. Bouris considered Lynton was 'Machiavellian' and 'manipulative' in his boardroom selections.

=== Week 3 ===
- Team changes: Amy moved to Pinnacle. Gavin moved to Eventus
- Project managers: Gavin ('Eventus') and Amy ('Pinnacle')
- Task: Create an original flavour of pie and sell at a market stall and from a portable van, with an aim to accrue the highest profit margin.
- Result: Eventus won, finishing with a $567.60 profit against Pinnacle's $194.70. Eventus gained an advantage by producing their pies (vegetable curry) for less than Pinnacle (roast lamb and potato), sticking to fixed pricing strategies, and by arranging upsells with free T-shirts. Eventus were cautioned for falsely marketing their pies as 'home-made'.
- Winner: Eventus
- Reward: Three-course dinner cooked by a French chef.
- Brought into the boardroom: Amy, Sam, Morello
- Fired: Amy, for not managing her team effectively and for failing to create a structure for their sales strategies.

=== Week 4 ===
- Team changes: Sabrina and Mary-Anne moved to Pinnacle. Blake and Sam moved to Eventus
- Project managers: Heather ('Eventus') and Mary-Anne ('Pinnacle')
- Task: Create and market a special function at a pub in the rural town of Mudgee, New South Wales. The teams had to sell tickets to their respective function, with the aim of making the most profit from the night
- Result: Pinnacle won by over $1000, finishing with a profit of $3930.05 compared to Eventus's $2814.40. Pinnacle gained an advantage by selling naming and sponsorship rights to the event, raking in additional revenue. Eventus failed to take advantage of the opportunity. Pinnacle was considered for disqualification as their advertising referred to Sabrina as Miss World Australia, a title she won three years earlier. The team was spared due to their acknowledgment of the mistake.
- Winner: Pinnacle
- Reward: A game of golf with Harvey Norman owner Gerry Harvey
- Brought into the boardroom: Heather, Gavin and Blake
- Fired: Blake, for not stepping up and taking a more active role.

=== Week 5 ===
- Project managers: Sam ('Eventus') and John ('Pinnacle')
- Task: Teams had to run a hotel and provide service to their guests for a day. The teams were judged based on their guests feedback.
- Result: Eventus won by 3 points, combining to a total of 176 out of a possible 250. Pinnacle scored 173 out of 250. The guests filled out survey forms rating specific tasks out of 10. This would then total to 250, which would determine the outcome of the task.
- Winner: Eventus
- Reward: Wine tasting at the Winevault by a sommelier.
- Brought into the boardroom: John, Mary-Anne and Sabrina
- Fired: John for being too passive as team leader, and not ensuring tasks were being correctly carried out. John also was seen smoking outside the hotel in uniform.

=== Week 6 ===
- Team changes: Heather moved to Pinnacle and Mary-Anne moved to Eventus.
- Project managers: Heather ('Pinnacle') and Carmen ('Eventus')
- Task: Develop a 30-second television commercial for Microsoft to help sell Windows 7.
- Result: Microsoft executives determined the best commercial, as a result, Pinnacle won. Although Pinnacle did not show the product in the ad, it was clear and very much Australian with the strap line "Tell your mates".
- Winner: Pinnacle
- Reward: Pinnacle got to go to Shangri-La Hotel to meet with the senior executives from Microsoft.
- Brought into the boardroom: Carmen and Gavin (by Mark Bouris)
- Fired: Carmen for her second loss as project manager and not focusing on the job. In addition, while Carmen was working on the brief, the rest of the members worked extremely well together creating the commercial in the studios. Also, during the project, when Carmen tried to clear the air with Gavin, but failed and Carmen wanted to sack him from the project.

=== Week 7 ===
- Team changes: Men (Gavin, Morello, and Sam) VS Women (Heather, Mary-Anne, and Sabrina).
- Project managers: Gavin ('Pinnacle') and Sabrina ('Eventus')
- Task: Choose 2 artists and sell their paintings at a gallery. Teams had 3 hours to sell their artists' paintings and make the most money.
- Result: Eventus won with sales totalling $30,130 while Pinnacle only sold a total of $5,300. This was partly due to Eventus taking advantage of their artist's existing client list and also due to Pinnacle's over-analysis and commodification of the art they were selling.
- Winner: Eventus
- Reward: Fitted with new clothes by Herringbone tailors
- Brought into the boardroom: Gavin, Morello, and Sam
- Fired: Sam for being too inexperienced and being under the radar. After he was fired, Bouris told Sam to come to his office to talk with him after the series was over.
- Notes: This is the biggest loss in the history of the Australian edition of The Apprentice so far. Bouris said that Eventus "blitzed" Pinnacle. The difference between the two teams' profits was $24,830.

=== Week 8 ===
- Project managers: Morello ('Pinnacle') and Mary-Anne ('Eventus')
- Task: To select and market an unsigned music artist.
- Result: While recording executives had doubts about the image that Pinnacle had come up with for their chosen band, they decided that on the whole Pinnacle had marketed their band better and had an edge in their pitch.
- Winner: Pinnacle
- Reward: Exclusive live performance by Cassie Davis
- Brought into the boardroom: Mary-Anne, Heather & Sabrina
- Fired: Sabrina, for failing to take a role to manage conflict between Mary-Anne and Heather

=== Week 9 ===
- Team changes: Morello moved to Eventus. Heather moved to Pinnacle
- Project managers: Gavin ('Pinnacle') and Mary-Anne ('Eventus')
- Task: Sell 3 products each, live on TVSN.
- Result: Pinnacle went for the strategy to not have little or no communication between each other, to avoid being distracted by the person who's talking to them through their earpiece. That means, the presenters had to memorise all their products. Mary-Anne from Eventus chose poor products for Morello, in particular an infinity dress. In addition, when Morello's demonstration on the vacuum cleaner did not work as planned, Mary-Anne didn't support Morello and laughed at the presentation. These mistakes cost Eventus victory and as a result, Pinnacle won by $93.
- Winner: Pinnacle
- Brought into the boardroom: Mary-Anne & Morello
- Fired: Mary-Anne for poor product choices and not supporting Morello when his live TV demonstration failed.
- Notes: Initially, Morello was the project manager for Eventus. After seeing a demonstration of live TV advertising, Mary-Anne decided to become project manager believing she had more to gain than Morello. Morello agreed and allowed Mary-Anne to become project manager. This is the first time a candidate became project manager during a task.

=== Week 10 (Finale) ===
- Prologue: All contestants were asked the same question "Why should Mark Bouris hire you?" All three candidates were praised for their outstanding performances throughout the season. However, Gavin was criticized for not being able to get along with most of the candidates, as well as not being able to use his teammates to their best extent when he was project manager.
  - Fired: Gavin, for not being able to bring out the best of his teammates.
- Teams:
  - Pinnacle: Morello with Carmen, Lynton, and Sam
  - Eventus: Heather with Gavin, Mary-Anne, and Sabrina
- Project Managers: Morello ('Pinnacle') and Heather ('Eventus')
- Task: Create a fragrance for men – create a name, bottle, print advertisement and a 30-second advertisement.
- Result:
  - Runner-Up: Heather, although her overall performance was great, she wasn't as impressive as Morello.
  - Hired: Morello

== Ratings and reception ==
The premiere episode had 692,000 viewers nationally, rating third in its timeslot. The second episode sank to fourth for the timeslot with 657,000 viewers nationally tuning in. The third episode rated a better with 823,000 viewers and winning the 9.30 pm timeslot. Viewer numbers remained steady for the fourth episode, with the same numbers as the previous week, 823,000. The fifth episode managed 742,000 viewers, which was followed up by an increasing figures of 832,000 and 874,000 viewers for the sixth and seventh episodes respectively.

Episode	Original airdate	Five-city metropolitan figures					Viewers Total (in millions)	Rank		Ref
Episode	Original airdate	Sydney	Melbourne	Brisbane	Adelaide	Perth	Viewers Total (in millions)	Night	Week	Ref
1	28 September 2009	223,000	263,000	87,000	60,000	53,000	0.686	No. 25	No. 76	
1	30 September 2009 (Note: An "encore" of the first episode aired on 30 September 2009 following the first Hey Hey It's Saturday reunion special.)	272,000	372,000	146,000	87,000	76,000	0.953	No. 10	—N/a	(Note: Figures and rankings for this episode are unadjusted from preliminary figures and therefore may be inaccurate.)
2	5 October 2009	—N/a					0.627	—N/a		
2	7 October 2009 (Note: An "encore" of the second episode aired on 7 October 2009 following the second Hey Hey It's Saturday reunion special, which overran The Apprentice Australia's entire timeslot. Due to the overrun of this special, and the fact that figures and rankings for this episode are unadjusted from preliminary figures, the figures and rankings therefore may be inaccurate.)	—N/a					1.677	—N/a		
3	12 October 2009	269,000	256,000	132,000	89,000	73,000	0.819	No. 19	No. 68	
4	19 October 2009	266,000	274,000	123,000	80,000	79,000	0.634	No. 16	No. 65	
5	26 October 2009	241,000	233,000	105,000	87,000	76,000	0.742	No. 22	No. 84	
6	2 November 2009	258,000	281,000	116,000	106,000	71,000	0.832	No. 16	No. 66	
7	9 November 2009	261,000	302,000	127,000	84,000	100,000	0.874	No. 17	—N/a	
8	16 November 2009	235,000	258,000	117,000	78,000	96,000	0.783	No. 17	No. 66	
9	16 November 2009	215,000	267,000	69,000	82,000	75,000	0.708	No. 21	No. 75	
10	23 November 2009	245,000	283,000	111,000	95,000	99,000	0.834	No. 17	—N/a	
Figures are adjusted from preliminary figures using data from the weekly rankings reports where possible.

== The Celebrity Apprentice Australia ==
The Celebrity Apprentice version of the series began to air on the Nine Network on 24 October 2011. A second series aired in 2012 and the third in 2013. After a one year break, the series was renewed for a fourth series, which aired in 2015. The series will return for a fifth season in 2021 after a six year hiatus with new CEO, Alan Sugar.
