= Inherited Cancers Australia =

Australian non-profit organisation

- Formation: 2009
- Type: Nonprofit
- Website: inheritedcancers.org.au
- Formerly called: Pink Hope

Pink Hope, rebranded as Inherited Cancers Australia (ICA) in August 2024, is an Australian not-for-profit organisation associated with hereditary cancer risk.

== History ==
Pink Hope was founded in 2009 by Australian health activist Krystal Barter after she learned she carried the BRCA1 gene mutation and underwent preventive surgery to reduce her cancer risk. The organisation aimed to ensure that Australians at high risk of cancer had the information to make informed decisions and receive ongoing support throughout their journey.

In 2016, Pink Hope launched a low-cost private genetic test for identifying BRCA gene mutations linked to hereditary breast and ovarian cancer.

In August 2024, the organisation rebranded as Inherited Cancers Australia (ICA), with ABN records showing the entity name changed on 27 August 2024.

Inherited Cancers Australia's stated vision is "a future where families can manage inherited cancer risk, informed and empowered, free from disadvantage.
