= National Breast Cancer Foundation (Australia) =

Australian cancer research charity

- Abbreviation: NBCF
- Formation: 1994; 32 years ago
- Type: Nonprofit
- Legal status: charity
- Headquarters: Sydney
- Region served: Australia
- Board Chair: Adjunct Professor Helen Zorbas AO
- CEO: Dr Cleola Anderiesz
- Revenue: $57 million (FY2023/24)
- Expenses: $44 million (FY2023/24)
- Website: https://nbcf.org.au/

The National Breast Cancer Foundation (NBCF) is an Australian non-profit organisation funding breast cancer research. It was established in 1994, and has awarded more than $200 million AUD to over 600 research projects across Australia. It primarily funds research projects studying the prevention of breast cancer, how to detect breast cancer early, stopping the progression and recurrence of breast cancer and treating hard-to-treat and metastatic breast cancer.

Campaigns organised by the organisation include its October Pink Ribbon campaign, its June GO PINK campaign, and its August Step Up to Breast Cancer campaign. It also participates in the Mother's Day Classic, a national walk-run held annually on Mother's Day.

NBCF is dedicated to funding world-class breast cancer research, towards driving progress towards their vision of Zero Deaths from breast cancer.
