= Mark Bouris =

Australian businessman

Mark Bouris AM
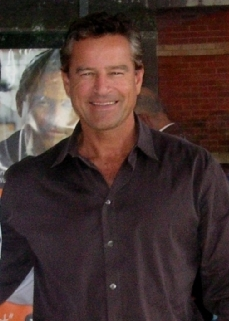
- Born: Mark Leigh Bouris; 30 November 1954 (age 71); Punchbowl, New South Wales, Australia
- Education: Benilde High School; University of New South Wales
- Occupations: Entrepreneur; Business executive Media personality
- Years active: 1980−present
- Employers: Founder and Executive Chairman of Yellow Brick Road; Executive Chairman of TZ Limited
- Notable work: Yellow Brick Road; Wizard Home Loans
- Spouse: Katherine Bouris (m. 1988; div. 2005)
- Website: markbouris.com.au

Mark Leigh Bouris AM (Greek: Μάρκος Λί Μπούρης, Irish: Marc Ó Laoidhigh Bouris; born 30 November 1954) is an Australian businessman who is best known as the founder and chairman of Wizard Home Loans, Australia's second largest non-bank mortgage lender behind Aussie Home Loans. He is now the chairman of Yellow Brick Road, a business which he founded in 2007. Bouris was the host of The Celebrity Apprentice Australia from 2011 to 2015. He has also hosted The Apprentice Australia and The Mentor, and has written numerous books and appeared on various podcasts. He manages Instagram and YouTube on social media.

== Early life ==
Bouris was born in Punchbowl, New South Wales to a Greek father of the Greek Orthodox faith and an Irish-Australian mother of the Roman Catholic faith. and lived in Punchbowl until the age of 18. Bouris attended Benilde High School in the nearby suburb of Bankstown. After high school, Bouris attended the University of New South Wales.

== Business career ==
Wizard Home Loans was founded by Bouris in 1996 and was sold to GE Money in 2004 for $500 million. In December 2008, during the 2008 financial crisis, Wizard was sold by GE to Aussie Home Loans for a fraction of the $500 million previous valuation.

=== Current business ===
On 18 June 2009, Bouris became the chairman of TZ Limited.

He currently is the chairman of Yellow Brick Road which is involved in finance planning, finance advice, wealth management and home loans. He is a board member and supporter of the Sydney Roosters rugby league team, in the Australian National Rugby League.

In August 2011, Bouris was appointed as non-executive chairman of Anteo Diagnostics, an Australian biotechnology company that provides innovative medical diagnostic technologies. He is also a Non-Executive Chairman of Serena Resources Limited, an Australian public resources company focused on developing copper opportunities in Chile.

== Awards ==
Bouris first entered the BRW Rich 200 list in 2005 and in 2007, he was included on the list for the second time.

In 2012, Bouris was awarded an Honorary Doctor of Business degree (Hon.D.Bus.) from the University of New South Wales (UNSW) and an Honorary Doctor of Letters degree (Hon.D.Litt.) from the now Western Sydney University (WSU).

At the 2015 Australia Day Honours, Bouris was appointed a Member of the Order of Australia for significant service to the finance industry, particularly the home loan mortgage sector, to education, and to charitable organisations.

== Media personality ==
Bouris has been well known by Australians for his personal appearance in Wizard Home Loan commercials during the late 1990s and early 21st century. He has also been well known by the Greek community because he has Greek heritage. Based on his high media profile, on 8 June 2009, Bouris was named as the host of the Australian version of The Apprentice to air on the Nine Network, the series aired in 2009 but only remained on air for one season. Bouris remained as host when the spin-off series The Celebrity Apprentice Australia premiered in October 2011. The Celebrity Apprentice was a huge success, and often rated within the top 5 television programs of the day. In November 2011, the Nine Network announced that they had renewed the series for a second season, which began airing in April 2012 and featured imported celebrity David Hasselhoff.

As well as regular media appearances, Bouris hosts The Mentor, a weekly podcast produced and distributed through the PodcastOne network. In 2017, it was announced Mark Bouris would be turning the podcast into a reality television show.

In November 2020, Mark Bouris launched his new podcast Straight Talk.
