= Miss Universe Australia 2026 =

22nd Miss Universe Australia pageant

- Date: 26 August 2026
- Presenters: Tegan Martin; Rob Mills
- Venue: Crown Melbourne, Melbourne, Australia
- Broadcaster: Seven Network; 7plus
- Entrants: 28
- Placements: 10
- Winner: Caitlin Worthington; Queensland
- Congeniality: Uma Dawson, New South Wales

Miss Universe Australia 2026 was the 22nd edition of the Miss Universe Australia pageant, held on 26 August 2026 at the Crown Melbourne in Melbourne, Australia.

Lexie Brant crowned Caitlin Worthington of Queensland as her successor at the end of the event. Worthington will represent Australia at the Miss Universe 2026 pageant, to be held in Puerto Rico later this year.

== Results ==
External videos
- Miss Universe Australia 2026 Finals
- ⭐️ MISS UNIVERSE AUSTRALIA 2026 by Miss Universe & Miss Universe Australia

=== Placements ===
| Placement | Contestant |
|---|---|
| Miss Universe Australia 2026 | Queensland – Caitlin Worthington |
| 1st Runner-Up | Western Australia – Georgia Van Zaanen |
| 2nd Runner-Up | Western Australia – Rowan Brent-White |
| 3rd Runner-Up | New South Wales – Uma Dawson |
| 4th Runner-Up | New South Wales – Kristabella Leembruggen |
| Top 10 | New South Wales – Sophie Trayner; Queensland – Paige Bentley; South Australia – Jess Davis; South Australia – Lili Sauerwald; Victoria – Audrey Panagopoulos |

== Contestants ==
The confirmed delegates are as follows:

| Represents | Contestant | Age | Hometown | Ref. |
|---|---|---|---|---|
| New South Wales | Ella Bullock | | Sydney | |
| New South Wales | Elif Venice Erdogan | | Baulkham Hills | |
| New South Wales | Isabella Charon | | Sydney | |
| New South Wales | Kristabella Leembruggen | | Sydney | |
| New South Wales | Maria Kamanda | | Fletcher | |
| New South Wales | Sophie Trayner | | Newcastle | |
| New South Wales | Uma Dawson | | The Rocks | |
| Queensland | Caitlin Worthington | 28 | Brisbane | |
| Queensland | Chloe Maddison Ryan | 25 | Brisbane | |
| Queensland | Hannah Seery | | Gold Coast | |
| Queensland | Jessica Elms | | Brisbane | |
| Queensland | Lily Goodare | 25 | Elanora | |
| Queensland | Paige Bentley | | Brisbane | |
| South Australia | Jess Davis | | Adelaide | |
| South Australia | Lili Sauerwald | | Adelaide | |
| Victoria | Amy Stewart | | Blackburn | |
| Victoria | Anastasia Chryssafis | | Middle Park | |
| Victoria | Audrey Panagopoulos | | Melbourne | |
| Victoria | Emily Soccol | | Melbourne | |
| Victoria | Lili Carroll | | Toorak | |
| Victoria | Nyakoat Dojiok | 23 | Ballarat | |
| Victoria | Sienna Van West | | Melbourne | |
| Western Australia | Aimee Wills | 26 | Perth | |
| Western Australia | Chelsea Ameduri | | Guildford | |
| Western Australia | Georgia Van Zaanen | | Perth | |
| Western Australia | Lily Bruins | 18 | Perth | |
| Western Australia | Rowan Brent-White | | Cottesloe | |
| Western Australia | Tahlia Reeve | 23 | Perth | |
| Western Australia | Tegan Headley | | Duncraig | |
