= Miss Universe Australia 2018 =

14th edition of Miss Universe Australia

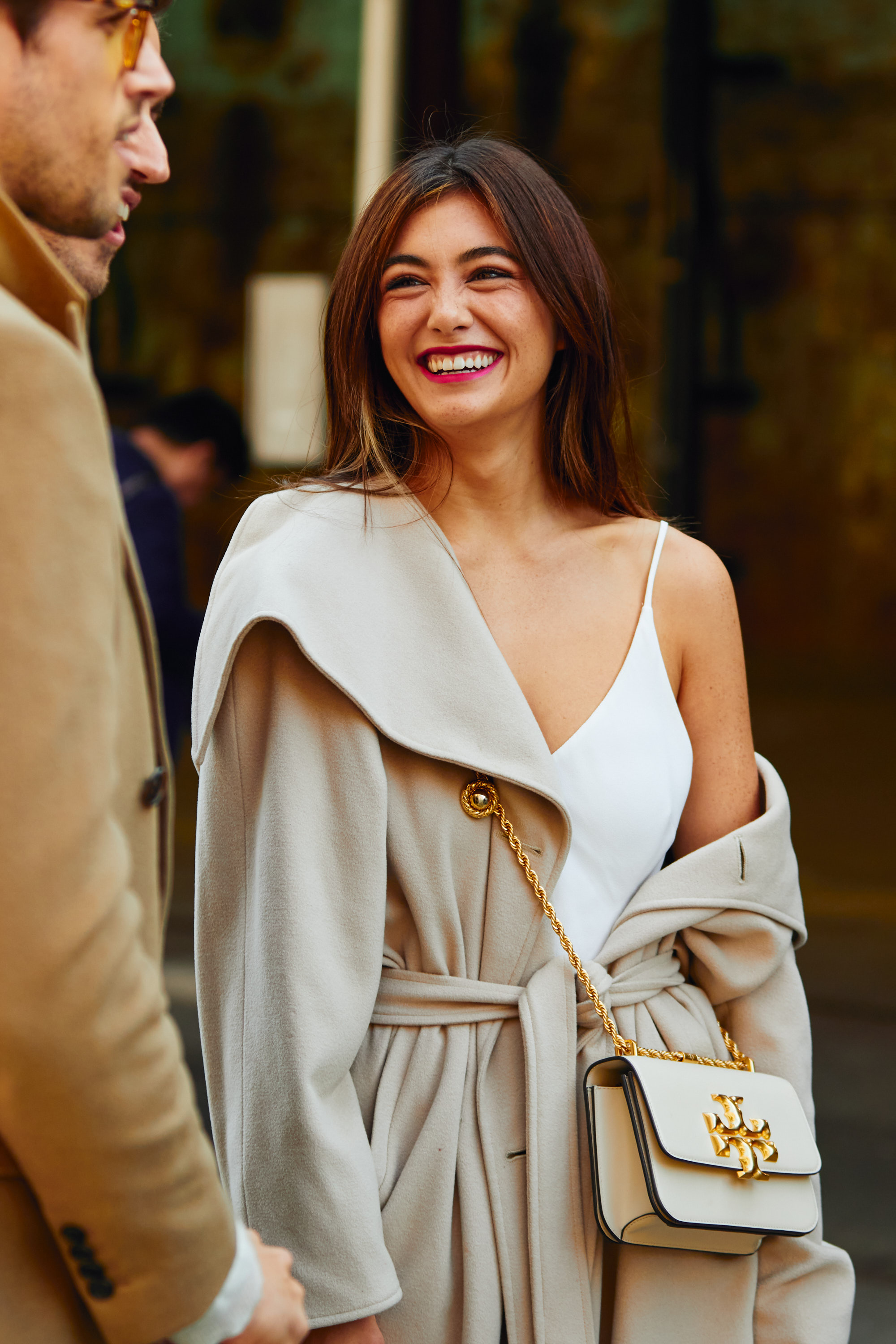
- Francesca Hung, the winner of Miss Universe Australia 2018.
- Date: June 28, 2018
- Presenters: Ash Williams; Olivia Wells
- Venue: Sofitel Melbourne on Collins, Melbourne, Victoria
- Entrants: 33
- Placements: 15
- Winner: Francesca Hung; New South Wales
- Miss Toybox: Emily Tokić; Capital Territory
- Social Media Ambassador: Tasha Ross; New South Wales

Miss Universe Australia 2018 was the 14th Miss Universe Australia pageant, held on June 28, 2018 at Sofitel Melbourne on Collins, Melbourne, Victoria. Olivia Rogers of South Australia crowned her successor Francesca Hung of New South Wales at the end of the event.

== Results ==
=== Placements ===
Placement	Contestant
Miss Universe Australia 2018	New South Wales – Francesca Hung
1st Runner-Up	Queensland – Jasmine Stringer
2nd Runner-Up	New South Wales – Tasha Ross
Top 5	Capital Territory – Emily Tokić; Victoria – Baylee Saltmarsh
Top 10	Queensland – Teagan Downey; Queensland – Madeline Epstein; South Australia – Dominique Chehade; Victoria – Tahan Lucile; Victoria – Darcy Spinks
Top 15	Northern Territory – Elle Schembri; Tasmania – Brooke Rogers; Tasmania – Elsie Killick; Victoria – Amy-Lee Dixon; Western Australia – Rikki Bremner

=== Special awards ===
Final results	Contestant
Miss Toybox	Capital Territory – Emily Tokić
Social Media Ambassador	New South Wales – Tasha Ross

== Delegates ==
Meet the 33 national delegates competing for the title of Miss Universe Australia 2018:

Represents	Contestant	Age	Height	Hometown
Western Australia	Leah Bell	19	1.78 m (5 ft 10 in)	Perth
Western Australia	Rikki Bremner	22	1.83 m (6 ft 0 in)	Perth
South Australia	Dominique Chehade	22	1.75 m (5 ft 9 in)	Adelaide
South Australia	Rutendo Chifamba	22	1.77 m (5 ft 9 1/2 in)	Adelaide
New South Wales	Ruby Compton	21	1.78 m (5 ft 10 in)	Newcastle
Victoria	Ashleigh Dittman	19	1.81 m (5 ft 11 1/2 in)	Melbourne
Victoria	Amy-Lee Dixon	21	1.76 m (5 ft 9 1/2 in)	Melbourne
Northern Territory	Rebecca Dowling	24	1.74 m (5 ft 8 1/2 in)	Darwin
Queensland	Tegan Downey	25	1.77 m (5 ft 9 1/2 in)	Brisbane
Queensland	Madeline Epstein	22	1.79 m (5 ft 10 1/2 in)	Gold Coast
New South Wales	Tahlia Giumelli	25	1.76 m (5 ft 9 1/2 in)	Woollahra
South Australia	Keava Hopper	21	1.70 m (5 ft 7 in)	Adelaide
New South Wales	Francesca Hung	24	1.73 m (5 ft 8 in)	Sydney
Tasmania	Elsie Killick	21	1.82 m (5 ft 11 1/2 in)	Hobart
Western Australia	Tamara Kordic	21	1.77 m (5 ft 9 1/2 in)	Perth
Western Australia	Remi Lane	19	1.77 m (5 ft 9 1/2 in)	Perth
Victoria	Tahan Lucile	22	1.75 m (5 ft 9 in)	Melbourne
Victoria	Lucy McArthur	18	1.76 m (5 ft 9 1/2 in)	Melbourne
Capital Territory	Maryellen McCormick	18	1.80 m (5 ft 11 in)	Canberra
Queensland	Deni McDermott	19	1.76 m (5 ft 9 1/2 in)	Brisbane
Western Australia	Savannah Monkhouse	23	1.75 m (5 ft 9 in)	Perth
New South Wales	Rosy Mae Reilly	23	1.77 m (5 ft 9 1/2 in)	Sydney
Tasmania	Brooke Rogers	21	1.78 m (5 ft 10 in)	Hobart
New South Wales	Tasha Ross	22	1.80 m (5 ft 11 in)	Sydney
Victoria	Baylee Saltmarsh	20	1.80 m (5 ft 11 in)	Melbourne
Queensland	Jacqueline Scheiwe	21	1.85 m (6 ft 1 in)	Brisbane
Northern Territory	Elle Schembri	21	1.83 m (6 ft 0 in)	Darwin
Western Australia	Hannah Sellman	26	1.75 m (5 ft 9 in)	Perth
New South Wales	Jordy Simmonds	22	1.75 m (5 ft 9 in)	Newcastle
Victoria	Darcy Spinks	23	1.78 m (5 ft 10 in)	Melbourne
Queensland	Jasmine Stringer	24	1.78 m (5 ft 10 in)	Gold Coast
Victoria	Lily Thorne	22	1.80 m (5 ft 11 in)	Melbourne
Capital Territory	Emily Tokić	21	1.78 m (5 ft 10 in)	Canberra
