= St Mary's Anglican Girls' School =

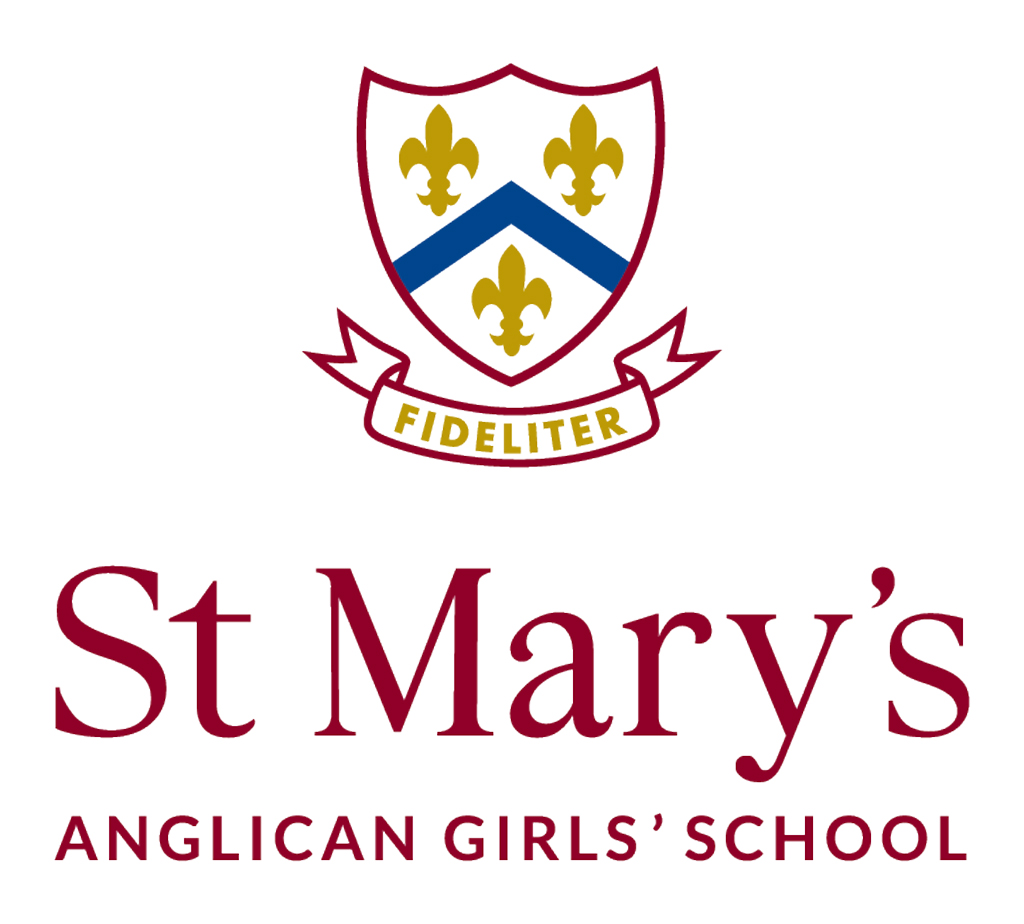

Location
- Karrinyup, Western Australia; Australia; 31°52′37″S 115°45′54″E

Information
- Type: Independent, day and boarding
- Motto: Latin: Fideliter (Faithfully)
- Denomination: Anglican
- Established: 1921
- Sister school: Hale School
- Chair: Elizabeth Carr
- Principal: Judith Tudball
- Chaplain: Father Richard Pengelley
- Gender: Girls
- Enrolment: c. 1,470 (K–12)
- Colours: Maroon, white and blue
- Athletics conference: IGSSA
- Website: www.stmarys.wa.edu.au

St Mary's Anglican Girls' School is an independent, Anglican, day and boarding school for girls, located in Karrinyup, a suburb north of Perth.

Established in 1921 at West Perth, St Mary's has a non-selective enrolment policy and currently caters for more than 1470 students from Kindergarten to Year 12, including 171 boarders from Years 6 to 12.

St Mary's is affiliated with the Association of Heads of Independent Schools of Australia (AHISA), the Junior School Heads Association of Australia (JSHAA), the Association of Independent Schools of Western Australia, the Australian Boarding Schools' Association (ABSA), the Alliance of Girls' Schools Australia (AGSA), and is a member of the Independent Girls' Schools Sports Association (IGSSA).

St Mary's brother school is Hale School, located in Wembley Downs.

== History ==
St Mary's Anglican Girls' School was founded when two private girls' schools operating in West Perth, Mrs Blanche Gouly's Girls' Grammar School and Miss Emily Hilfirty's Alexandra High School, amalgamated. The school opened on 14 September 1921, with The Reverend Charles Lawrence Riley as Acting Principal. Two other schools later joined them. The school was located at 40 Colin Street, West Perth.

In 1964, a building appeal was launched to develop the present campus at Karrinyup. Under the guidance of the then Principal, Anne Symington (1965–1982), St Mary's operated in both West Perth and Karrinyup until 1970, when the entire school was finally situated in Karrinyup.

== Facilities ==
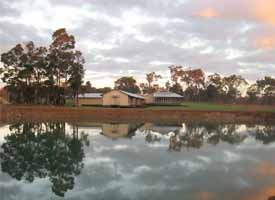
St Mary's at Metricup: The Lady Treatt Centre for Learning and Leadership

St Mary's campus in Karrinyup is located on 40 acres of land.

In 1999, the school built a performing arts venue, The Lady Wardle Performing Arts Centre, with an auditorium that seats 509 people. Later, an adjoining building, The Lady Treatt Centre for Music and Dance, was built. It contains a dance studio, as well as a number of music classrooms and individual music tuition rooms.

The school grounds also boast The Sir Thomas Wardle Swimming Pool Complex, which includes a 50m heated swimming pool, paddle pool and dive pool, which was refurbished in 2011, as well as two gymnasiums (Dannatt Hall and Hearn Hall). Hearn Hall was largely funded by the Federal Government's Building Education Revolution Primary Schools for the 21st Century Program. In 2012, the school completed construction of a new library complex.

In 2005, the St Mary's Anglican Girls’ School Foundation purchased 100 acres (40 ha) of land in Metricup, which is located in the Margaret River Wine Region, to develop its flagship outdoor education facility, St Mary's at Metricup: The Lady Treatt Centre for Learning and Leadership, which was opened in 2008. The centre is the first of its kind for an all-girls school in Western Australia and was funded by the Foundation, as well as donations from Old Girls, parents and friends of the school. The facilities were designed and constructed in a manner which maximises their environmental sustainability. The property contains two dams, two large pastures, an eco-tent camping area, dormitory accommodation and a cottage.

== Academic performance ==
In 2000, 2007, 2008 and 2010, St Mary's was the top-ranked school in Western Australia based on the highest number of students scoring in the top third of Western Australian Certificate of Education (WACE) results.

Year	State ranking (Note: Ranking of school compared to other schools in the state)	St Mary's Median ATAR	State Median ATAR	% graduation (Note: Percentage of Year 12 cohort that graduated with a WACE certificate)
2020	7	90.3	81.65	100
2019	4	91.15	81.05	99.38
2018	3	91.90	81.80	100
2017	5	91.45	81.25	100
2016	8	90.40	80.95	98.3
2015	3	91.85	78.95	100
2014	4	91.55	78.95	99.24
2013	2	91.45	78.95	100
2012	3	90.08	78.9	100

== Principals ==
Period	Details
1921–1923	Bishop Charles Lawrence Riley
1923–1937	Miss Ethel H Dannatt
1938–1940	Miss Katherine Cameron Carter
1940–1944	Miss Beryl Hamilton
1944–1956	Elizabeth Myles
1957–1965	Theresa Macdonald
1965–1982	Anne Symington
1983–1997	Audrey Jackson
1997–2018	Lynne Thomson
2019–present	Judith Tudball

== House system ==
As with most Australian schools, St Mary's utilises a house system. Each student at St Mary's is assigned to one of six houses: Craig, Hackett, Lefroy, Riley, Wardle and Wittenoom.

Through the house system, students participate in extra-curricular activities and competitions. Each house has a Year 12 prefect who, together with captains and the guidance of a house teacher, leads the house through the year's activities. Captains include - dance captain, drama captain, music captain, community captain and sports captain. There are also minor captains. Houses often compete against each other in inter-house athletics, swimming, singing and other activities, including the arts at the Creative And Performing Arts Festival (C.A.P.A.F). Throughout the year, the houses compete for the House Cup presented at the end of the year to the house with the most points awarded from inter-house competitions.

== Notable alumnae ==
Alumnae of St Mary's Anglican Girls' School are commonly referred to as Old Girls, and become life members of the alumni association, the St Mary's Old Girls' Association on graduation. Some notable St Mary's Old Girls include:

- Scherri-Lee Biggs – television presenter and Miss Universe Australia 2011
- Jill Crommelin – Journalist for The West Australian, The Australian Women's Weekly, The Straits Times (Singapore) and the Sunday Independent (also attended Presbyterian Ladies' College, Perth)
- Jessica Gethin – Conductor and violinist, Chief Conductor and Musical Director of the Perth Symphony Orchestra
- Ashleigh Gillon – Sky News Political Reporter, National Press Club Wallace Brown Young Achiever (2011), Most Outstanding Broadcast Journalist (2011 ASTRA Awards)
- Michelle Gordon – Justice of the High Court of Australia (also attended Presbyterian Ladies' College, Perth)
- Sandra Hayter – Administration Director of the Pastoralists and Graziers Association of Western Australia
- Mollie Lukis OBE OAM BA Hons Dip Ed, FLAA, Hon D Litt (1911–2009) – WA State Archivist and Librarian. Awarded an OBE Order of the British Empire, Officer (Civil) 1976 "Archival work", and an OAM Medal of the Order of Australia 2004 for service to the preservation and recording of Australia's cultural heritage, particularly through the National Trust of Australia (WA) and the Toyal Western Australian Historical Society.
- Ruby (Ray) Gertrude Oldham (McClintock) OAM BA UWA (1911–2005) – Landscape Architect, Journalist, Historian, Writer and campaigner for the conservation of heritage and the built environment. Made a Member of the Order of Australia in 1985 for service to the community through conservation of the man-made and natural environment.
- Jan Stewart – Chief Executive Officer of Lotterywest
- Jasmin Stewart – Australian rules footballer for Fremantle
- Kylie Wheeler – heptathlete, silver medalist 2002 Commonwealth Games
- Kaylia Stanton – Netballer
- Annika Lee-Jones – Netballer

== See also ==
- Anglican Church of Australia
- List of schools in the Perth metropolitan area
- List of boarding schools
