= Francesca Hung =

Australian model and beauty pageant titleholder (born 1994)

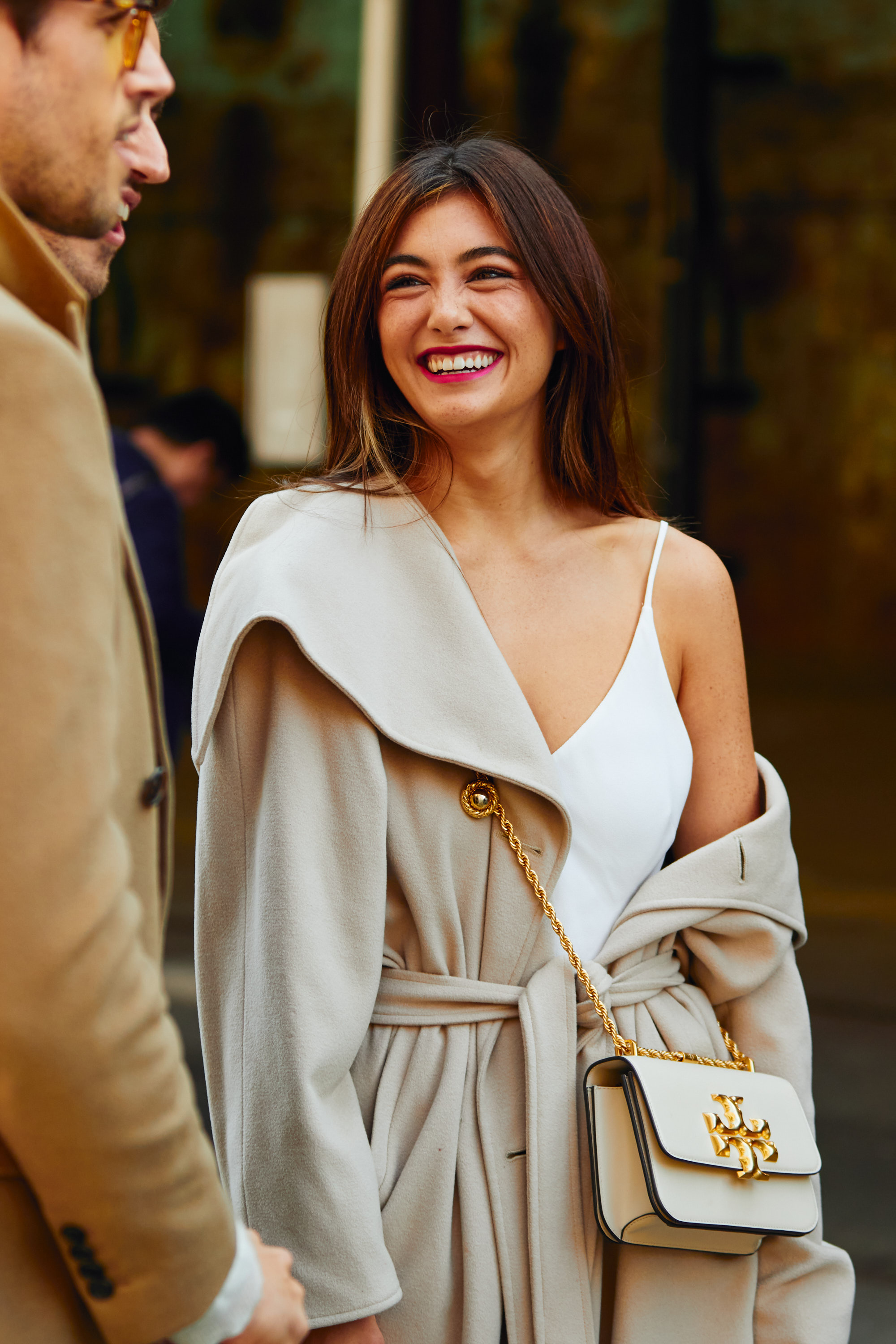
- Born: 25 April 1994 (age 32); Sydney, Australia
- Education: Loreto Kirribilli; University of Sydney
- Height: 1.73 m (5 ft 8 in)
- Beauty pageant titleholder
- Title: Miss Universe Australia 2018
- Years active: 2018–present
- Hair color: Brown
- Eye color: Brown
- Major competitions: Miss Universe Australia 2018 (Winner); Miss Universe 2018 (Top 20)

Francesca Hung (born 25 April 1994) is an Australian model and beauty pageant titleholder who was crowned Miss Universe Australia 2018. She represented Australia at Miss Universe 2018, where she finished as a wildcard in the Top 20.

== Personal life ==
She is from the Northern Beaches of Sydney and is the daughter of Chinese-Australian father and an Irish-Australian mother. She is a professional model. She is studying for a Master's in publishing at the University of Sydney after completing an undergraduate degree in arts and sociology.

== Pageantry ==
=== Miss Universe Australia 2018 ===
Hung has crowned Miss Universe Australia 2018 pageant and she won as Miss Universe Australia 2018.

Awards and achievements
Preceded by (South Australia) Olivia Rogers	Miss Universe Australia; 2018	Succeeded by (Victoria (state)) Priya Serrao
