= Olivia Rogers =

Olivia Rogers may refer to:

- Olivia Rogers, Miss Universe Australia 2017
- Olivia Rogers, singer in The Voice UK series 13
