= Miss Universe Australia 2023 =

19th Miss Universe Australia pageant

- Date: September 1, 2023
- Withdrawals: Capital Territory; Northern Territory; Tasmania
- Winner: Moraya Wilson; Victoria

Miss Universe Australia 2023 was the 19th edition of the Miss Universe Australia pageant, held on September 1, 2023.

Monique Riley of New South Wales crowned Moraya Wilson of Victoria as her successor at the end of the event. Wilson will represent Australia at the Miss Universe 2023 competition, set to take place in El Salvador towards the end of the year.

== Results ==
=== Final Placements ===
| Final results | Contestant |
|---|---|
| Miss Universe Australia 2023 | Victoria - Moraya Wilson |
| 1st Runner-Up | New South Wales - Farida Rakhmanova |
| 2nd Runner-Up | Western Australia - Brooklyn Metropolis |
| 3rd Runner-Up | New South Wales - Tash Knox |
| 4th Runner-Up | Queensland - Bree Monck |
| Top 10 | New South Wales - Sené Maluwapi; Queensland - Lily Goodare; Victoria - Brooke Bailey; Victoria - Johara Pillay; Western Australia - Vimbayi Hakutangwi |

== Delegates ==
The confirmed delegates are as follows:

| Represents | Contestant | Age | Hometown | Ref. |
|---|---|---|---|---|
| New South Wales | Farida Rakhmanova | | Sydney | |
| New South Wales | Sené Maluwapi | 19 | Sydney | |
| New South Wales | Tash Knox | | Sydney | |
| New South Wales | Vitoria Camporeale | 23 | Sydney | |
| Queensland | Breanna "Bree" Monck | 21 | Gold Coast | |
| Queensland | Dominique Ross | | Brisbane | |
| Queensland | Emily Outridge | | Sunshine Coast | |
| Queensland | Lily Goodare | 23 | Elanora | |
| Queensland | Sabrina D'Odorico | | Gold Coast | |
| South Australia | Emily Rogers | | Adelaide | |
| South Australia | Efthimia "Mia" Dalkos | 22 | Adelaide | |
| Victoria | Alexandra Danielle Lim | | Melbourne | |
| Victoria | Brooke Bailey | | Melbourne | |
| Victoria | Claire Rossier | | Melbourne | |
| Victoria | Johara Pillay | 22 | Melbourne | |
| Victoria | Lauren Walker | 26 | Nar Nar Goon | |
| Victoria | Maddison Cottle | | Melbourne | |
| Victoria | Moraya Wilson | 21 | Melbourne | |
| Western Australia | Brooklyn Metropolis | 21 | Perth | |
| Western Australia | Khloe Hicks | | Perth | |
| Western Australia | Mary Lopez | 23 | Perth | |
| Western Australia | Natasha Huisman | | Mount Helena | |
| Western Australia | Somaya O’Donnell | 25 | Albany | |
| Western Australia | Vimbayi Hakutangwi | 19 | Perth | |
