= Laura Dundovic =

Australian model (born 1987)

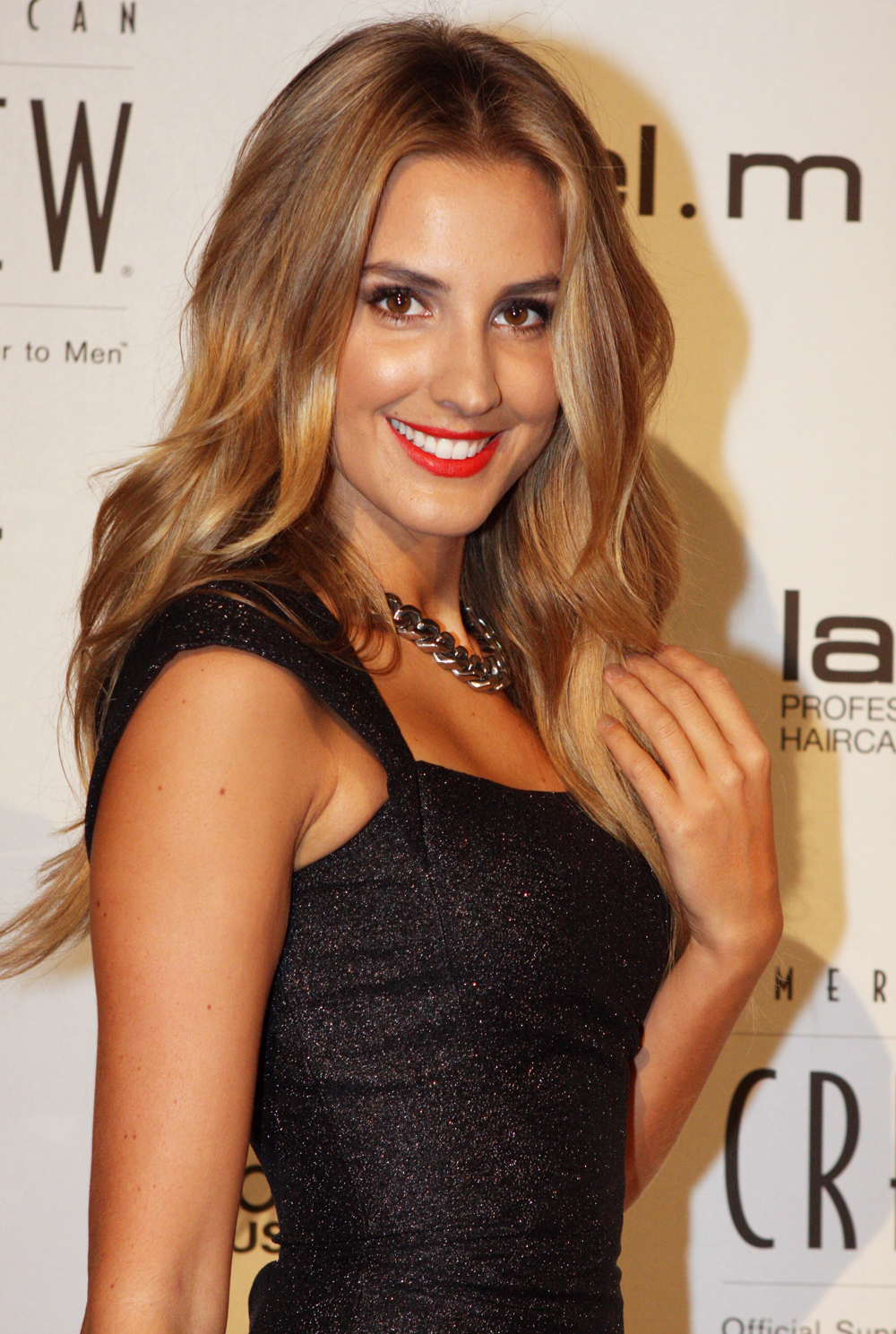
- Dundovic at the 2013 Australian Hair Fashion Awards
- Born: 16 September 1987 (age 39); Sydney, Australia
- Education: Mount St Benedict College; Macquarie University
- Height: 1.80 m (5 ft 11 in)
- Beauty pageant titleholder
- Title: Miss Universe Australia 2008
- Hair colour: Light brown
- Eye colour: Hazel
- Major competition: Miss Universe 2008 (top 10)

Laura Dundovic (/ˈdʌndəvɪk/ DUN-də-vik; born 16 September 1987 in Sydney, Australia) is an Australian model, actress and beauty pageant titleholder who won Miss Universe Australia 2008 and represented Australia in the Miss Universe 2008 competition, in which she placed in the top 10. She also took part in the Australian version of I'm A Celebrity Get Me Out Of Here.

== Education ==
Dundovic has a degree in psychology from Macquarie University.

== Personal life ==
Dundovic's father and paternal grandfather are from Croatia.

Dundovic supports the Western Sydney Wanderers in the A-League and supported Sydney United, club founded by Australian Croats; her brother played youth football for Northern Spirit. She grew up in the Sydney suburbs of Greystanes and Dural.

Dundovic developed ME/CFS at age 15 when she contracted glandular fever.

Dundovic was in a relationship with rugby union player Quade Cooper from 2015 until 2020.

Awards and achievements
Preceded by (Queensland) Kimberley Busteed	Miss Universe Australia; 2008	Succeeded by (Queensland) Rachael Finch
