= Jesinta Franklin =

Australian model (born 1991)

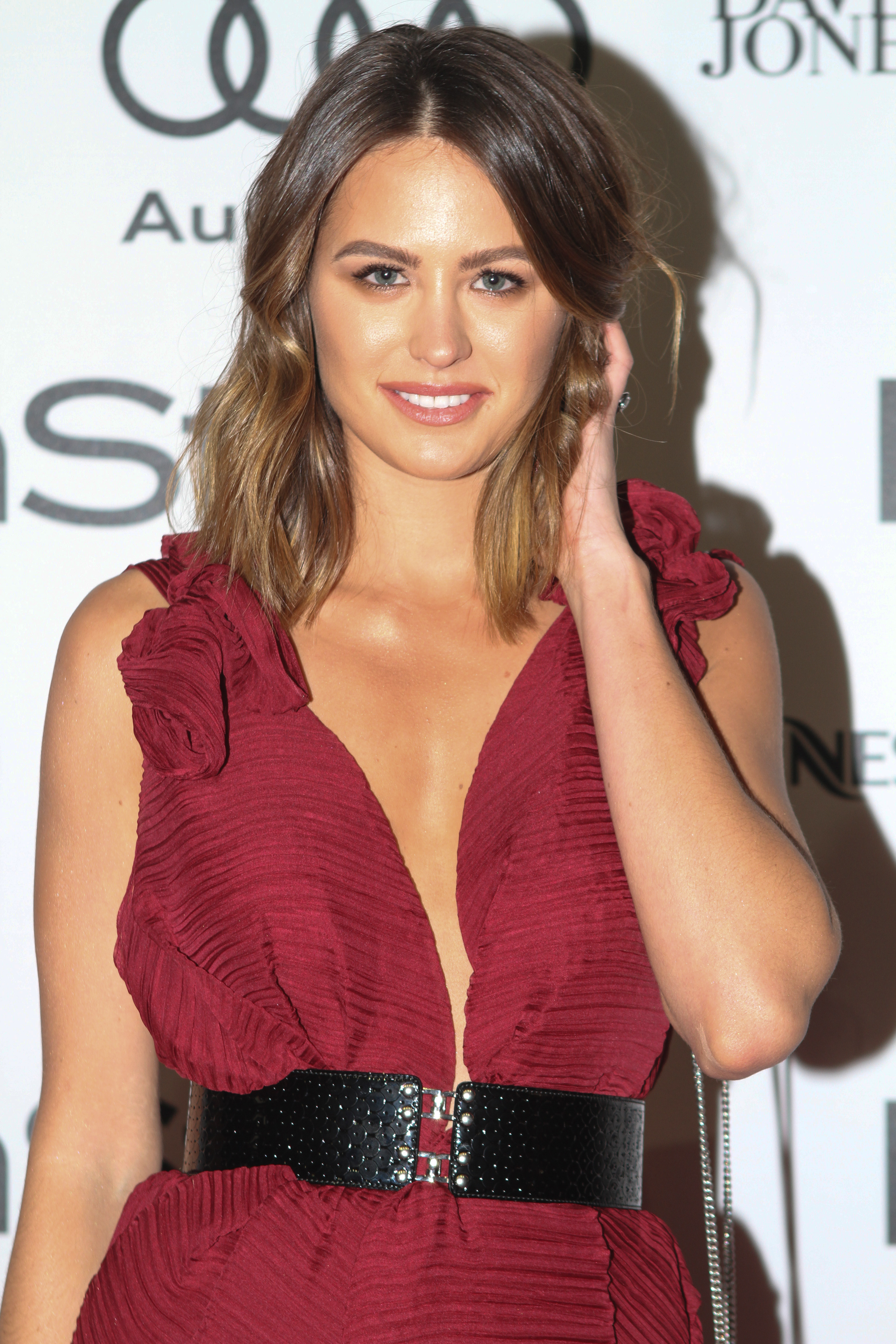
- Franklin at the InStyle Awards in May 2015
- Born: Jesinta Campbell; 12 August 1991 (age 35); Gold Coast, Queensland, Australia
- Occupation: Model
- Height: 1.75 m (5 ft 9 in)
- Spouse: Lance Franklin (m. 2016)
- Children: 2
- Beauty pageant titleholder
- Title: Miss Universe Australia 2010
- Years active: 2009–present
- Hair color: Blonde
- Eye color: Blue
- Major competitions: Miss Universe Australia 2010 (Winner); Miss Universe 2010 (2nd Runner-Up) (Miss Congeniality)

Jesinta Franklin (née Campbell; born 12 August 1991) is an Australian model and beauty pageant titleholder who was crowned Miss Universe Australia 2010 and represented Australia at Miss Universe 2010, placing 2nd Runner-Up.

== Early life ==
Franklin was born and raised on the Gold Coast, Queensland, and attended Silkwood School during her youth and Aquinas College through her high school years.

== Modelling career ==
Franklin was crowned Miss Universe Australia 2010 on 17 June 2010 representing Queensland. She later competed at the 2010 edition of the Miss Universe pageant on 23 August 2010 and finished as the 2nd Runner-Up behind Yendi Phillipps (Jamaica) and winner Ximena Navarrete (Mexico). She was also designated Miss Congeniality at this pageant.

In February 2016, Franklin became an ambassador for department store David Jones. This arrangement ended in December 2017.

== Media career ==
Franklin (as Jesinta Campbell) published her first book, Live a Beautiful Life, in October 2016.

=== Television ===
In September 2010, she became a guest reporter for entertainment and fashion subjects on Seven Network's The Morning Show.

In October 2011, she appeared as a contestant on the Nine Network's The Celebrity Apprentice Australia as a member of Team Unity.

=== Radio ===
Franklin appeared on the Hot30 Countdown on 3 January 2012 and filled in for Maude Garrett with Matty Acton for one week. She came back as Matty Acton's co-host on 27 February 2012 on the Hot30 Countdown.

== Personal life ==
Jesinta Franklin is married to Australian rules football player Lance Franklin, who played for the Hawthorn Hawks and the Sydney Swans in the Australian Football League (AFL). They married in November 2016 in a private ceremony with close friends and family. Their daughter Tullulah was born in February 2020. Their son Rocky was born in March 2021. They welcomed a second baby boy on 24 December 2025.

Awards and achievements
| Preceded by (Kosovo) Marigona Dragusha | Miss Universe 2nd Runner-Up; 2010 | Succeeded by (Brazil) Priscila Machado |
| Preceded by (Queensland) Rachael Finch | Miss Universe Australia; 2010 | Succeeded by (Western Australia) Scherri-Lee Biggs |
