= Sally Ayhan =

Australian presenter

- Born: Sally Craig; 1983 (age 42–43)
- Occupations: Presenter, writer, journalist
- Relatives: Maxine Hughes
- Modeling information
- Height: 5 ft 9 in (1.75 m)

Sally Ayhan (born 1983) is an Australian news presenter and correspondent.

Ayhan is a former news presenter on Nine News Perth, and former Washington correspondent and presenter on TRT World, based in Istanbul, Turkey. She is currently an anchor on CGTN America.

== Career ==
Ayhan has reported across Europe and the Middle East region on a wide range of major breaking news stories including the refugee crisis in Greece, terror attacks in Ankara and Istanbul and the 2016 Iran elections.

Prior to working in news, Ayhan completed a period of studying and working in Turkey which included writing for Time Out Istanbul and working for Turkish television. She returned to Australia in 2008 and began to work as a presenter on various online channels including a film review program, and produced lifestyle content.

In July 2014, Sally resigned from Nine Network in August to study international relations in the United Kingdom. Ayhan finished with the Nine Network in September and was replaced by Scherri-Lee Biggs.

Media offices
Preceded by Angela Tsun	Nine News Perth; Weather presenter 2013–2014	Succeeded by Scherri-Lee Biggs
