= Miss Universe Australia 2022 =

18th Miss Universe Australia pageant

- Date: September 9, 2022
- Entrants: 36
- Placements: 15
- Returns: Capital Territory; Northern Territory; Tasmania
- Winner: Monique Riley; New South Wales

Miss Universe Australia 2022 was the 18th edition of the Miss Universe Australia pageant held at the Warner Bros. Movie World in Gold Coast, Queensland on September 9, 2022. Daria Varlamova of Victoria crowned her successor Monique Riley of New South Wales at the end of the event. She represented Australia at Miss Universe 2022 where she placed in the top 16.

== Results ==
=== Placements ===
Placement	Contestant
Miss Universe Australia 2022	New South Wales – Monique Riley
1st Runner-Up	Victoria – Annalise Dalins
2nd Runner-Up	Queensland – Ciara Grehan
3rd Runner-Up	South Australia – Hànni Rose Howe
4th Runner-Up	Queensland – Alana Deutsher-Moore
Top 10	New South Wales – Elissa Laforce; New South Wales – Kymberlee Street; Queensland – Miné Coetser; South Australia – Jacinta Pizzata; Victoria – Darcy Spinks
Top 15	New South Wales – Sienna Mae Weir; New South Wales – Taylah Jane Crome; South Australia – Mariah Cannon; Victoria – Ariel Ploszaj-Russell; Western Australia – Cayla-Lee de Villiers

== Candidates ==
The delegates are as follows:

Represents	Contestant	Age	Height	Hometown
Australian Capital Territory	Ann Marie Tatter	19	1.83 m (6 ft 0 in)	Canberra
Australian Capital Territory	Maia Van der Hoogen	23	1.85 m (6 ft 1 in)	Canberra
New South Wales	Elissa Laforce	24	1.78 m (5 ft 10 in)	Sydney
New South Wales	Elle Solferini	22	1.77 m (5 ft 10 in)	Sydney
New South Wales	Kymberlee Street	25	1.75 m (5 ft 9 in)	Sydney
New South Wales	Monique Riley	27	1.78 m (5 ft 10 in)	Sydney
New South Wales	Sienna Mae Weir	22	1.81 m (5 ft 11 in)	Sydney
New South Wales	Stella Badenoch	28	1.78 m (5 ft 10 in)	Sydney
New South Wales	Taylah Jane Crome	22	1.76 m (5 ft 9 in)	Sutherland Shire
Northern Territory	Bethany Ann Vassovich	19	1.80 m (5 ft 11 in)	Alice Springs
Northern Territory	Maria Isabelle Jones	20	1.77 m (5 ft 10 in)	Darwin
Queensland	Alana Deutsher-Moore	20	1.73 m (5 ft 8 in)	Gold Coast
Queensland	Caitlynn Henry	25	1.73 m (5 ft 8 in)	Brisbane
Queensland	Catalina Meldrum	20	1.80 m (5 ft 11 in)	Brisbane
Queensland	Chloe Maddison Ryan	21	1.76 m (5 ft 9 in)	Brisbane
Queensland	Ciara Grehan	19	1.76 m (5 ft 9 in)	Gold Coast
Queensland	Jacinta Cahill	22	1.81 m (5 ft 11 in)	Gold Coast
Queensland	Miné Coetser	21	1.80 m (5 ft 11 in)	Brisbane
Queensland	Shekinah Taderera	21	1.77 m (5 ft 10 in)	Gold Coast
South Australia	Hànni Rose Howe	22	1.78 m (5 ft 10 in)	Adelaide
South Australia	Janitha Perera	26	1.70 m (5 ft 7 in)	Adelaide
South Australia	Mariah Cannon	22	1.78 m (5 ft 10 in)	Adelaide
Tasmania	Allison Panikian	27	1.86 m (6 ft 1 in)	Hobart
Tasmania	Lucy Ann Morelle	27	1.80 m (5 ft 11 in)	Hobart
Tasmania	Penelope Saint James	25	1.82 m (6 ft 0 in)	Hobart
Victoria	Annalise Dalins	21	1.76 m (5 ft 9 in)	Melbourne
Victoria	Ariel Ploszaj-Russell	21	1.68 m (5 ft 6 in)	Melbourne
Victoria	Ashleigh Sullivan	27	1.76 m (5 ft 9 in)	Ballarat
Victoria	Darcy Spinks	26	1.74 m (5 ft 9 in)	Melbourne
Victoria	Sallyanne Kurkze	26	1.80 m (5 ft 11 in)	Melbourne
Western Australia	Ashleigh Post	19	1.83 m (6 ft 0 in)	Albany
Western Australia	Briana Demaio	20	1.72 m (5 ft 8 in)	Perth
Western Australia	Cayla-Lee de Villiers	25	1.75 m (5 ft 9 in)	Perth
Western Australia	Diana Hills	18	1.80 m (5 ft 11 in)	Perth
Western Australia	Jacinta Pizzata	23	1.74 m (5 ft 9 in)	Perth
Western Australia	Sienna Perruzza	25	1.73 m (5 ft 8 in)	Perth
