= Moraya Wilson =

Australian model and beauty pageant titleholder

- Occupations: Sports coach; model
- Height: 1.77 m (5 ft 10 in)
- Beauty pageant titleholder
- Title: Miss Universe Australia 2023
- Major competitions: Miss Universe Australia 2023; (Winner); Miss Universe 2023; (2nd Runner-Up)

Moraya Wilson is an Australian model, former athlete and beauty pageant titleholder who was crowned Miss Universe Australia 2023, and represented Australia at the 72nd Miss Universe competition in El Salvador where she finished as 2nd Runner-up, Australia's highest placement since 2010.

== Early life and career ==
Wilson graduated with a Bachelor of Business Marketing Degree, at RMIT University in Melbourne, and has been working as a model. She works as a sports coach at a secondary school.

== Pageantry ==
=== Miss Universe Australia 2023 ===
Wilson won Miss Universe Australia 2023, on 1 September 2023, at the Wentworth Hotel in Melbourne. She represented the state of Victoria and competed against 24 other contestants. She was crowned by Monique Riley of New South Wales.

=== Miss Universe 2023 ===
On 18 November 2023, Wilson represented Australia at Miss Universe 2023 in El Salvador and finished in third place.

Awards and achievements
| Preceded by (Dominican Republic) Andreína Martínez | Miss Universe 2nd Runner-Up; 2023 | Succeeded by (Mexico) María Fernanda Beltrán |
| Preceded by Monique Riley, New South Wales | Miss Universe Australia; 2023 | Succeeded by Zoe Creed, Queensland |
