= Jasmine Stringer =

Australian beauty pageant titleholder

- Born: 1996 or 1997 (age 29–30); Gold Coast, Queensland, Australia
- Education: Griffith University (Bachelor of Education)
- Occupations: Educator; model; author
- Beauty pageant titleholder
- Title: Miss World Australia 2023; Miss World Oceania 2025
- Major competitions: Miss Universe Australia 2018; (1st Runner-Up); Miss Universe Australia 2021; (2nd Runner-Up); Miss World Australia 2023; (Winner); Miss World 2025; (Top 20); (Miss World Oceania)

Jasmine Stringer (born c. 1996/1997) is an Australian educator, model, author, and beauty pageant titleholder who won Miss World Australia 2023. She represented her country at Miss World 2025, where she placed in the top 20 and was named Miss World Oceania 2025.

== Early life and education ==
Stringer was raised on the Northern Gold Coast, Queensland, Australia. She completed her primary and secondary schooling locally at Ashmore State School and Aquinas College. Following secondary school, she worked as an international commercial model in Bangkok, Thailand, before returning to Australia to complete her tertiary studies.

In 2019, Stringer graduated with a Bachelor of Education from Griffith University. She subsequently worked as a relief primary school teacher in the Gold Coast area.

== Pageantry ==
Stringer began her pageantry career as a teenager in Queensland, where she won the Miss Teenager Universe title. She competed in Miss Universe Australia 2018, finishing as the first runner-up. She competed in Miss Universe Australia 2021, representing Queensland, and finished as the second runner-up.

Stringer competed in and won Miss World Australia 2023, held at the Gold Coast Convention and Exhibition Centre in Broadbeach, Queensland. She represented Australia at Miss World 2025 in Telangana, India, where she reached the top 20 and was named Miss World Oceania 2025.

== Advocacy ==
Stringer's community advocacy focuses primarily on family safety and support for vulnerable populations. She has served as a committee member and active fundraiser for the Tara Brown Foundation, an organization supporting women's emergency housing and community support services in Australia.

As an author, Stringer published Brave Little Voice, a children's educational book focused on personal safety awareness and identifying trusted adult figures.

Awards and achievements
Preceded by (Australia) Kristen Wright	Miss World Oceania; 2025	Succeeded by (Cook Islands) Tiarē Henry-Anguna
Preceded by Kristen Wright	Miss World Australia; 2023	Succeeded by Olivija Spanovskis
