= Miss Universe Australia 2021 =

Beauty pageant

- Date: October 19, 2021
- Venue: Sofitel Melbourne on Collins, Melbourne, Victoria
- Entrants: 31
- Placements: 12
- Withdrawals: Capital Territory; Tasmania
- Winner: Daria Varlamova; Victoria
- Congeniality: Elissa Laforce; New South Wales; Rutendo Chifamba; Western Australia

Miss Universe Australia 2021 was the 17th edition of the Miss Universe Australia pageant held on October 19, 2021 at Sofitel Melbourne on Collins, Melbourne, Victoria. Maria Thattil of Victoria crowned her successor Daria Varlamova of Victoria at the end of the event. Varlamova represented Australia at Miss Universe 2021, but was unplaced.

== Results ==
Final results	Contestant
Miss Universe Australia 2021	Victoria – Daria Varlamova
1st Runner-Up	New South Wales – Mia Brooks
2nd Runner-Up	Queensland – Jasmine Stringer
3rd Runner-Up	Western Australia – Ally Draper
4th Runner-Up	New South Wales – Tiana Meehan
Top 12	New South Wales – Stephanie Steel; New South Wales – Vakoo Kauapirura; Queensland – Lily Goodare; Victoria – Stacey Fleming; Western Australia – Anastasia Puia; Western Australia – Baylee Saltmarsh; Western Australia – Tasha Mae Marciano

=== Special awards ===
Award	Contestant
Miss Congeniality	New South Wales – Elissa Laforce; Western Australia – Rutendo Chifamba
Social Ambassador	Queensland – Jasmine Stringer

== Delegates ==
The delegates were as follows:

State/Territory	Contestant	Age	Height	Hometown
New South Wales	Julia Newbery	26		Sydney
New South Wales	Sarah Wilson	21		Newcastle
New South Wales	Stephanie Steel			
New South Wales	Vakoo Kauapirura		1.75 m (5 ft 9 in)	
New South Wales	Elissa Laforce	23	1.78 m (5 ft 10 in)	Brussels
New South Wales	Tiana Meehan		1.75 m (5 ft 9 in)	
New South Wales	Mia Brooks			
Queensland	Nina Evans			
Queensland	Jasmine Stringer	24	1.78 m (5 ft 10 in)	Gold Coast
Queensland	Ella van Seters		1.74 m (5 ft 8 1/2 in)	Brisbane
Queensland	Karri Nicholas			
Queensland	Lily Goodare			
South Australia	Hannah Miller		1.73 m (5 ft 8 in)	
South Australia	Cailea Shaw			
South Australia	Sabrina Uhlmann			
South Australia	Caitlin Bahr			
Victoria	Madi Krstevski	21		
Victoria	Stacey Fleming			
Victoria	Emily Jane Ward	23	1.65 m (5 ft 5 in)	
Victoria	Jess Kernjak	22		Melbourne
Victoria	Daria Varlamova	26	1.70 m (5 ft 7 in)	Bryansk
Victoria	Hawra Khalil			
Western Australia	Anastasia Puia		1.73 m (5 ft 8 in)	Bucharest
Western Australia	Ally Draper	21		
Western Australia	Cody McPhail			
Western Australia	Josephine Volk			
Western Australia	Kya Pedrick	25		Perth
Western Australia	Rutendo Chifamba			
Western Australia	Tiphany Katselas			
Western Australia	Tasha Mae Marciano	25	1.74 m (5 ft 8 1/2 in)	Perth
Western Australia	Baylee Saltmarsh	23	1.80 m (5 ft 11 in)	Perth
