= Kimberley Busteed =

Australian beauty pageant titleholder (born 1988)

- Born: 4 June 1988 (age 38); Gladstone, Queensland, Australia
- Beauty pageant titleholder
- Title: Miss Universe Australia 2007
- Hair color: Blonde
- Eye color: Brown
- Major competitions: Miss Universe Australia 2007 (Winner); Miss Universe 2007 (Unplaced)

Kimberley Busteed (born 4 June 1988) is an Australian TV host, model and beauty pageant titleholder who won Miss Universe Australia 2007 and represented Australia in the 2007 Miss Universe pageant. She is from Gladstone in Central Queensland, Australia and is a former teen swimming champion and surf lifesaving competitor. In 2006 she was the Fashion on the Field winner at the Doomben races in Brisbane, following that she won the Melbourne Cup Fashions on the Field. In 2012 Busteed resumed her competitive swimming by competing in the Noosa Tri, swimming the 1500m ocean stretch for her team.

== Personal life ==
Busteed is married to retired cricketer Chris Simpson. They have two daughters Victoria and Evie.

== Career ==
While competing in Mexico during the Miss Universe 2007 contest, she was heavily criticized for wearing her "tacky" national costume. Some of Australia's top designers branded the red lifesaving themed costume as "trashy" and "nothing to do with Australia's culture". However she was endorsed by designers Wayne Cooper and Peter Morrissey in the same year.

Busteed has worked extensively with the Leukaemia Foundation, inspired by the death of her brother at the age of 9.

Near the end of 2008, Busteed obtained a position as a TV presenter on Channel 7's Creek to Coast and Queensland's Weekender. She later went on to work as a presenter for radio with Nova 106.9.

Awards and achievements
| Preceded by (Australian Capital Territory) Erin McNaught | Miss Universe Australia; 2007 | Succeeded by (New South Wales) Laura Dundovic |
