= Caris Tiivel =

Australian Model

- Born: 27 February 1993 (age 33); Perth, Western Australia, Australia
- Height: 1.78 m (5 ft 10 in)
- Beauty pageant titleholder
- Title: Miss Universe Australia 2016
- Hair color: Brown
- Eye color: Green
- Major competitions: Miss Universe Australia 2016 (Winner); Miss Universe 2016 (Unplaced)

Caris Tiivel (born 27 February 1993) is an Australian model and beauty pageant titleholder who won Miss Universe Australia 2016. She represented Australia at Miss Universe 2016 in the Philippines.

== Pageantry ==
=== Miss Universe Australia 2016 ===
Tiivel was crowned Miss Universe Australia 2016 on 31 August 2016 and represented Australia at Miss Universe 2016.

=== Miss Universe 2016 ===
Tiivel represented Australia at Miss Universe 2016 but failed to make the cut despite being a favorite.

Awards and achievements
Preceded by (New South Wales) Monika Radulovic	Miss Universe Australia; 2016	Succeeded by (South Australia) Olivia Rogers
