= Renae Ayris =

Australian dancer and model (born 1990)

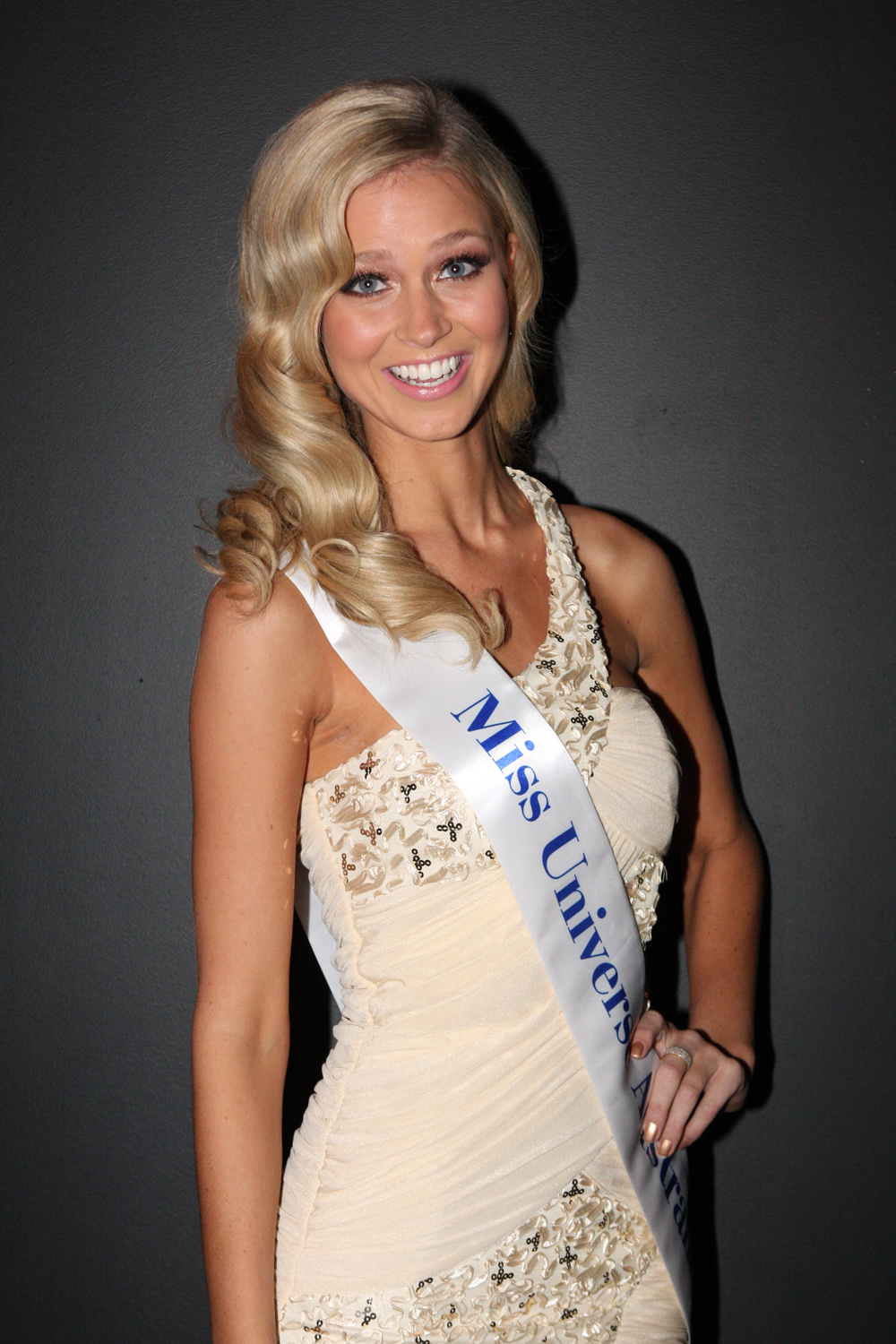
- Ayris in 2012
- Born: 17 September 1990 (age 36); Perth, Western Australia, Australia
- Height: 1.78 m (5 ft 10 in)
- Spouse: Andrew Papadopoulos (m. 2019)
- Beauty pageant titleholder
- Title: Miss Universe Australia 2012
- Hair color: Blonde
- Eye color: Blue
- Major competitions: Miss Universe Australia 2012; (Winner); Miss Universe 2012; (3rd Runner-Up)

Renae Ayris (born 17 September 1990) is an Australian dancer, model and beauty pageant titleholder who was crowned Miss Universe Australia 2012 and placed 3rd Runner-Up at the Miss Universe 2012 pageant. In 2014 she appeared in the starring role of Shannon Noll's music video for his single We Only Live Once

== Pageantry ==
=== Miss Universe Australia 2012 ===
Ayris won the Miss Universe Australia competition on 9 June 2012 in a ceremony held at Melbourne's Sofitel Hotel, outdoing 35 other delegates from across the country. This confirmed her place in the Miss Universe pageant. As Miss Universe Australia, Ayris got the opportunity to travel around her country working for charities, events, and photoshoots, and most recently worked in China with Operation Smile Australia, is a nonprofit medical service organization which provides cleft lip and palate repair surgeries to children.

=== Miss Universe 2012 ===
Ayris represented Australia at Miss Universe 2012 on 19 December 2012 in Las Vegas, Nevada, United States. She finished fourth overall (3rd Runner-Up), ahead of Gabriela Markus (Brazil) and behind Irene Esser (Venezuela), Janine Tugonon (Philippines) and eventual winner Olivia Culpo (USA) (her roommate).

== Appearances in reality shows ==
Ayris was a contestant in the Australian reality television series, 'Celebrity Splash!'.

In 2016, Ayris was cast in the second season of SBS TV series First Contact.

Awards and achievements
Preceded by (Philippines) Shamcey Supsup	Miss Universe 3rd Runner-Up; 2012	Succeeded by (Philippines) Ariella Arida
Preceded by (Western Australia) Scherri-Lee Biggs	Miss Universe Australia; 2012	Succeeded by (Victoria (state)) Olivia Wells
