= Rachael Finch =

Australian TV host and model (born 1988)

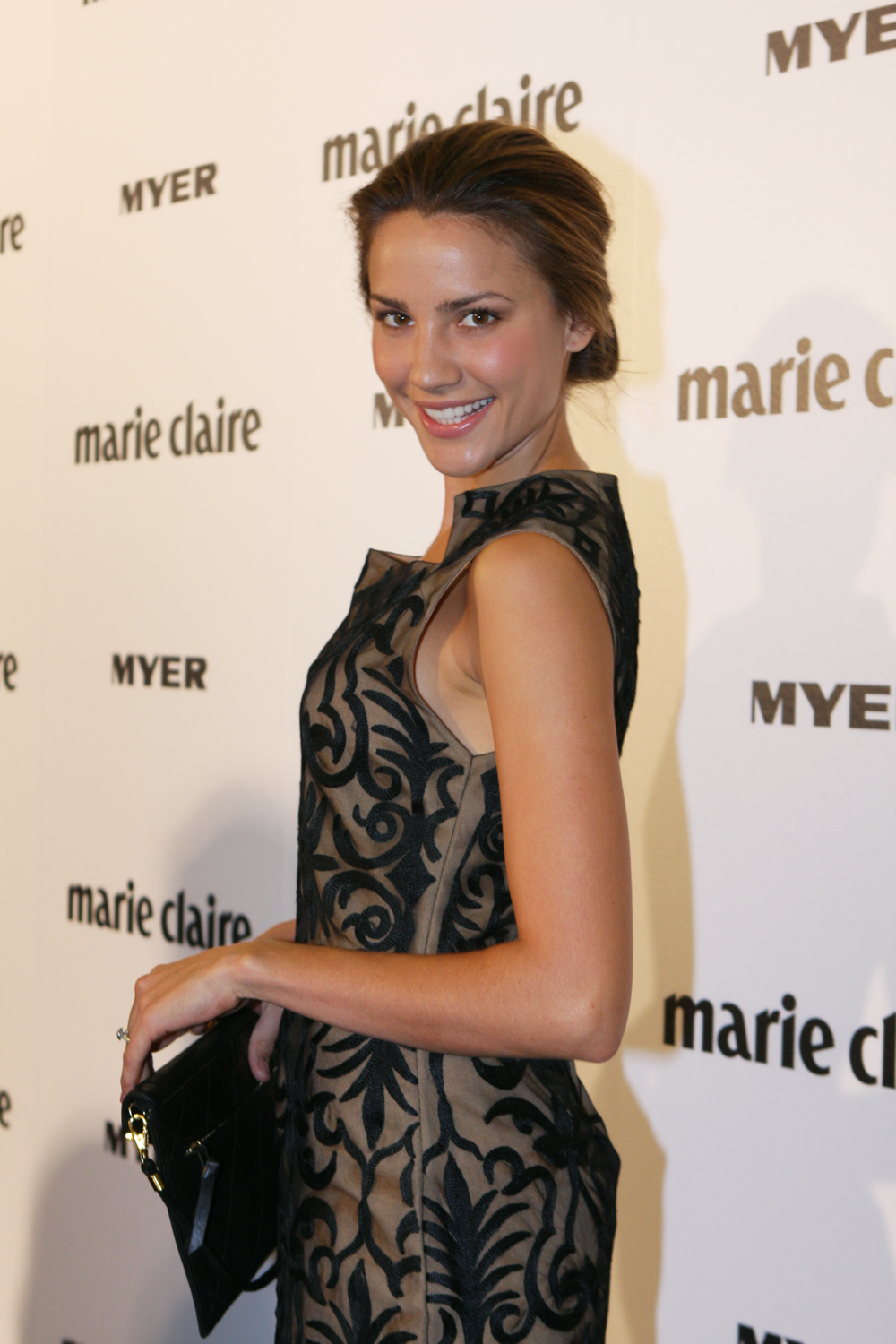
- Finch in April 2012
- Born: 8 July 1988 (age 38); Townsville, Queensland, Australia
- Height: 1.77 m (5 ft 9 1/2 in)
- Spouse: Michael Miziner (m. 2013)
- Children: 2
- Beauty pageant titleholder
- Title: Miss Universe Australia 2009
- Hair color: Medium Brown
- Eye color: Brown
- Major competitions: Miss Universe Australia 2009 (Winner); Miss Universe 2009 (3rd Runner-Up)

Rachael Finch (born 8 July 1988) is an Australian TV host, model and beauty pageant titleholder. She was awarded the 'People's Choice Award' for the 2006 Miss Teen Australia and finished as 3rd runner-up at Miss Universe 2009.

== Career ==
=== Modelling ===
Finch's modelling career kick-started in 2004 when she won the Queensland Model of the Year title. In 2006, she was first seen by international agents Ford, Click, Elite, and IMG at a ProScout event held in Brisbane. Finch was crowned Miss Universe Australia on 22 April 2009 and subsequently represented Australia at the Miss Universe 2009 pageant held in the Bahamas on 23 August 2009. She was roommates with Miss USA, Kristen Dalton, during the Miss Universe campaign.

=== Television ===
Finch was one of the contestants on the first season of Celebrity MasterChef Australia in 2009. She progressed to the semi-finals, where she and Biggest Loser trainer Michelle Bridges made it through to the next stage. She reached the grand-finals in which she came third overall. Finch also appeared in the 2010 series of Dancing with the Stars. She was eliminated on 1 August 2010.

After Dancing with the Stars, Finch was a daily weather presenter on Channel 7's morning breakfast show Sunrise. She also worked for the Seven Network as a reporter for several of its programs across current affairs and sports telecasts as well as making contestant appearances on Seven Network's in-house celebrity competition programs. Her work for Seven Sport saw her cover events such as the Australian Open, Melbourne Cup, Brownlow Medal, and the Olympic Games.

=== Dancing with the Stars performances ===
In late 2010, Rachael Finch joined the cast of the tenth season of Dancing with the Stars. Finch's partner was Michael Miziner, the partner to the original winner of Dancing with the Stars, Bec Cartwright. Despite receiving some negative comments from judge Todd McKenney over lack of content with their choreography, Finch and Miziner had been named the dark horse couple by the judges. Despite maintaining high scores, Finch and Miziner were the fifth couple eliminated on 1 August 2010.

Week #	Dance/Song	Judges' score			Total Score	Result
Week #	Dance/Song	Todd	Helen	Mark	Total Score	Result
1	Cha-cha-cha / "Telephone"	7	8	8	23	Safe
2	Tango / "Objection (Tango)"	3	7	7	17	Safe
3	Paso Doble / "Would I Lie To You?"	7	8	8	23	Safe
4	Quickstep / "Valerie"	7	8	8	23	Safe
5	Samba / "Hey Baby"	9	9	9	27	Safe
6	Aussie Smooth / "Bad Day"	6	7	7	20	Eliminated

== Personal life ==
Finch is half-Anglo-Celtic Australian through her father and half-Ukrainian through her mother.

Finch married her former Dancing with the Stars partner Michael Miziner on 3 January 2013. Finch gave birth to her daughter, Violet Rachael Miziner, in September 2013. She gave birth to her second child, Dominic Michael Miziner in March 2017. She and her husband launched a natural cosmetics and consumable products company, Kissed Earth, in 2019.

Finch has contributed to charitable causes after appearing in Australian luxury lifestyle magazine, Box Magazine, in 2010 to raise money for children's charity ToyBox International.

In 2022, Finch revealed that she suffered an eating disorder during her time as a model, and had removed her breast implants (which she had since she was 17) after one had ruptured.

Awards and achievements
Preceded by (Russia) Vera Krasova	Miss Universe 3rd Runner-Up; 2009	Succeeded by (Ukraine) Anna Poslavska
Preceded by (New South Wales) Laura Dundovic	Miss Universe Australia; 2009	Succeeded by (Queensland) Jesinta Campbell
