= Tegan Martin =

Australian model, hairdresser and beauty pageant titleholder (born 1992)

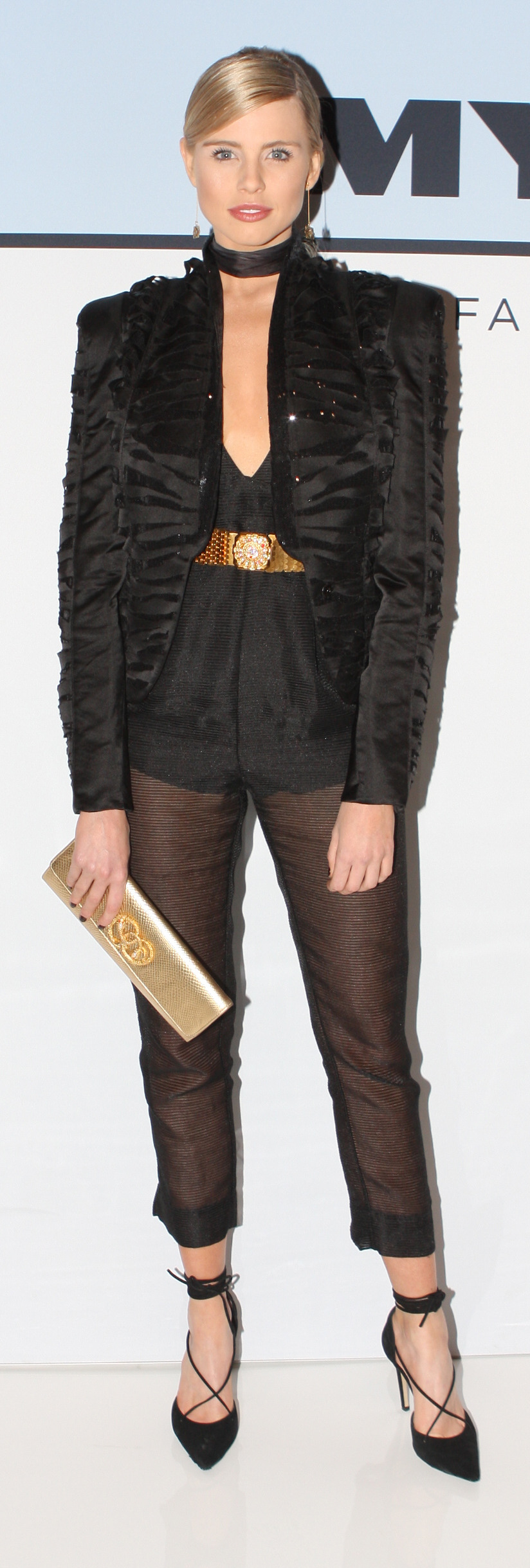
- Martin in 2015
- Born: Tegan Jade Martin; 7 September 1992 (age 34); Newcastle, New South Wales, Australia
- Occupations: Model, hairdresser, beauty pageant titleholder
- Height: 1.78 m (5 ft 10 in)
- Beauty pageant titleholder
- Title: Miss Universe Australia 2014
- Years active: 2009–present
- Hair color: Blonde
- Eye color: Blue
- Major competitions: Miss Universe Australia 2011 (1st Runner-Up); Miss Universe Australia 2013 (1st Runner-Up); Miss Universe Australia 2014 (Winner); Miss Universe 2014 (Top 10)

Tegan Jade Martin (born 7 September 1992) is an Australian model, hairdresser and beauty pageant titleholder who was crowned Miss Universe Australia on 6 June 2014 and represented her country Australia at the Miss Universe 2014, placed in the Top 10.

== Early life ==
Tegan Martin grew up in the suburbs of Charlestown and Jewells in the city of Newcastle NSW. Martin attended St Joseph's Primary School Charlestown and then St Mary's High School Gateshead until Year 10 when she left school to become a full-time hairdressing apprentice at Pandora's Hair Witchery. Martin has been living in Sydney for the last few years in order to further her modeling career. She is now studying a Bachelor of Health Science and is a qualified hair and make-up artist.

== Career ==
=== Pageantry ===
==== Miss Universe Australia 2011 ====
Martin finished as the 1st Runner-up at Miss Universe Australia 2011 represented Newcastle. Meanwhile, the official winner was Scherri-Lee Biggs from Watermans Bay, Perth crowned as 2011 winner and competed at Miss Universe 2011 in São Paulo, Brazil. She placed in Top 10.

==== Miss Universe Australia 2013 ====
Martin finished as the 1st Runner-up at Miss Universe Australia 2013 represented Newcastle. Meanwhile, the official winner was Olivia Wells from Melbourne, Victoria crowned as the 2013 winner and competed at Miss Universe 2013 in Moscow, Russia where she did not place in the top 16.

==== Miss Universe Australia 2014 ====
Martin was crowned as Miss Universe Australia 2014 represented Newcastle on her third attempt.

==== Miss Universe 2014 ====
Martin represented Australia at Miss Universe 2014 where she placed among the Top 10. Her roommate was Miss USA, Nia Sanchez who placed first runner-up.

=== Television ===
==== Celebrity Apprentice ====
In 2015, Martin appeared as a celebrity contestant on the fourth season of Nine Network's Australian reality series The Celebrity Apprentice Australia. Martin was fired in the 7th task, but raised $130,782 for her charity The Sydney Children's Hospital Westmead (Metabolic Clinic).

==== I'm a Celebrity ====
In January 2017, Martin was revealed as a celebrity contestant on the third season of Network Ten's Australian reality series I'm a Celebrity...Get Me Out of Here!. On 5 March 2017, Martin was the 6th celebrity eliminated from the series after 38 days in the jungle coming in 9th place.

Awards and achievements
Preceded by (Victoria (state)) Olivia Wells	Miss Universe Australia; 2014	Succeeded by (New South Wales) Monika Radulovic
