= Monika Radulovic =

Australian model and beauty pageant titleholder

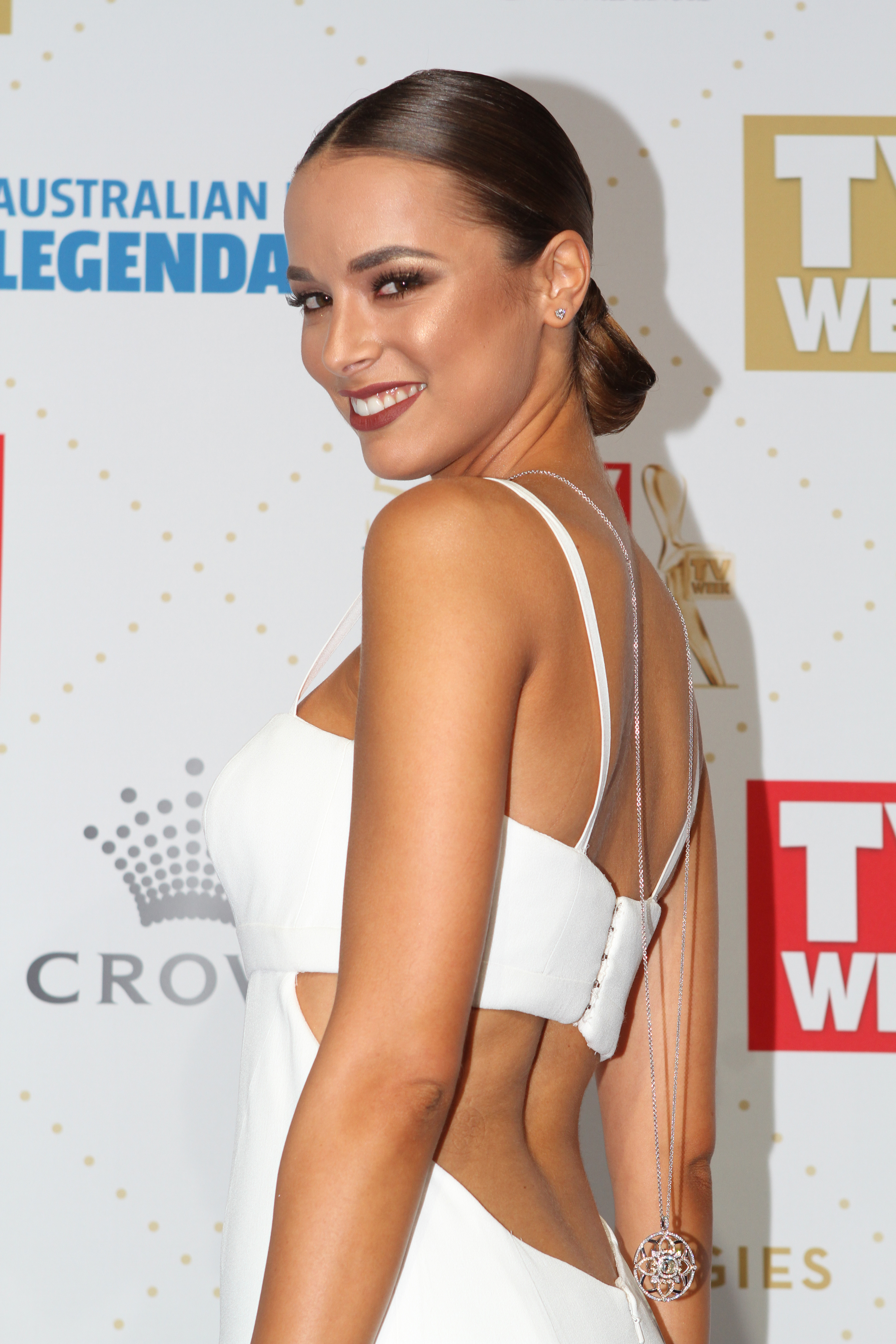
- Born: 20 September 1990 (age 36); Zavidovići, SR Bosnia and Herzegovina, SFR Yugoslavia
- Height: 1.78 m (5 ft 10 in)
- Spouse: Alesandro Ljubicic (m. 2018)
- Children: 2
- Beauty pageant titleholder
- Title: Miss Universe Australia 2015
- Hair color: Brown
- Eye color: Hazel
- Major competitions: Miss Tourism International 2012; (1st Runner-Up); (Miss Tourism Metropolitan); Miss Universe Australia 2014; (3rd Runner-Up); Miss Universe Australia 2015; (Winner); Miss Universe 2015; (Top 5)

Monika Radulovic; Serbian: Моника Радуловић, romanized: Monika Radulović (born 20 September 1990) is an Australian model and beauty pageant titleholder who was crowned Miss Universe Australia 2015 and represented Australia at the Miss Universe 2015 pageant, ultimately placing in the Top 5 finalist.

== Personal life ==
Monika Radulovic was born to parents Goran and Vinka in SFR Yugoslavia. Her family came to Australia as refugees from the Bosnian War when she was four. Radulovic graduated with honours in Psychology at the Western Sydney University.

=== Miss Universe Australia 2015 ===
On 5 June 2015, Radulovic was crowned Miss Universe Australia 2015 in the ballroom at the Sofitel on Collins in Melbourne and represented New South Wales. Thirty-five contestants competed for the crown. She previously placed as third runner-up at the Miss Universe Australia 2014, while Tegan Martin won the title in that year.

=== Miss Universe 2015 ===
Radulovic represented Australia at 64th Miss Universe pageant where she placed in the top five.

=== Australian Survivor: Champions vs. Contenders ===
In August 2018, it was revealed that Radulovic would be participating in Australian Survivor: Champions vs Contenders and would be part of the Champions tribe.

Early in the game, Radulovic allied herself with Russell Hantz, a former player of the American version of Survivor, but was blindsided when he was voted out only five days into the game. After Hantz was voted out, Radulovic kept a low profile and was able to make it through the tribe phase of the game while only going to four tribal councils. Going into the merge, she found herself in a tight alliance with Brian Lake and the two were able to make it to the final six along with Shonee Fairfax and Fenella McGowan, two allies they made during the merge. At the final six, the two remaining members of the opposing alliance, Shane Gould and Sharn Coombes, were successfully able to blindside McGowan using a Hidden Immunity Idol due to a mistake Lake made when splitting the votes. Angry with Lake, Fairfax joined the opposing alliance and opted to vote out Lake at the next tribal council. After Lake had lost the immunity challenge, the opposing alliance changed their mind due to fear that Lake had a Hidden Immunity Idol and voted out Radulovic in a 3–2 vote. She placed 5th and became the 7th member of the jury, ultimately voting for Gould to win.

Awards and achievements
Preceded by (Netherlands) Yasmin Verheijen (3rd Runner-Up) (Jamaica) Kaci Fennell (4th Runner-Up)	Miss Universe Top 5 Finalist (with (France) Flora Coquerel); 2015	Succeeded by (Kenya) Mary Esther Were (Philippines) Maxine Medina (Thailand) Chalita Suansane (Top 6)
Preceded by (New South Wales) Tegan Martin	Miss Universe Australia; 2015	Succeeded by (Western Australia) Caris Tiivel
