= Monique Riley =

Australian model and actress

- Beauty pageant titleholder
- Title: Miss Universe Australia 2022
- Major competitions: Miss Universe Australia 2022; (Winner); Miss Universe 2022; (Top 16)

Monique Riley is an Australian beauty pageant titleholder who won Miss Universe Australia 2022. She represented Australia at Miss Universe 2022, and reached the top 16.

== Early life ==
Riley grew up in the Noosa region of the Sunshine Coast, Queensland. She was educated at Sunshine Beach State High School and Good Shepherd Lutheran College. After leaving school she completed a creative industries degree at QUT in Brisbane.

== Pageantry ==
=== Miss Universe Australia 2022 ===
On September 9, 2022, Riley competed and won against 36 other candidates at Miss Universe Australia 2022, at the Warner Bros. Movie World in Gold Coast, Queensland.

=== Miss Universe 2022 ===
As Miss Universe Australia, Riley represented Australia at Miss Universe 2022, and reached the top 16.

Awards and achievements
Preceded by Daria Varlamova	Miss Universe Australia; 2022	Succeeded by Moraya Wilson, Victoria
