= Scherri-Lee Biggs =

Australian beauty pageant contestant

- Born: Scherri-Lee Biggs; 28 August 1990 (age 36); South Africa
- Education: St Mary's Anglican Girls' School
- Spouse: Daniel Venables (m. 2023)
- Children: 1
- Beauty pageant titleholder
- Title: Miss Universe Australia 2011
- Hair color: Blonde
- Eye color: Blue
- Major competitions: Miss Universe Australia 2011; (Winner); Miss Universe 2011; (Top 10)

Scherri-Lee Biggs (born 28 August 1990) is an Australian model, beauty pageant titleholder, dancer and presenter. She was crowned Miss Universe Australia 2011 and represented Australia at Miss Universe 2011, where she was placed in the Top 10.

Biggs currently presents the weather on Nine News Melbourne.

== Early life ==
Biggs was born in South Africa and emigrated with her family to Perth, Western Australia when she was 8, where she attended St Mary's Anglican Girls' School. From a young age, she was schooled in dance and ballet, but she pursued a career in modelling at age 16, after being scouted by Vivien's modelling agency.

== Miss Universe ==
Biggs, a popular delegate and favourite to win the competition, became Miss Universe Australia on 7 July 2011 in a ceremony held at Melbourne's Sofitel hotel, outdoing 21 other delegates from across the country. This certified her with a place in the Miss Universe pageant, held in São Paulo, Brazil on 12 September 2011, where she finished in the top 10.

== Career ==
After competing in Miss Universe, Biggs began working with the Seven Network in Melbourne where she was a reporter for sporting events broadcast on Seven Sport and daily travel show Coxy's Big Break until two years later, when she returned to Perth.

In August 2014, Biggs was announced as the new weather presenter on Nine News Perth, replacing Sally Ayhan. She remains as the current weather presenter as of 2023 and has also covered events happening in Perth.

In October 2020, Biggs was announced as a celebrity contestant on the new season of The Celebrity Apprentice Australia in 2021. On the show, she won $20,000 for her charity, Dress for Success, before being eliminated in the 8th episode, finishing in 7th place out of 14 celebrities.

On 11 December 2025, the Nine Network announced that Biggs would replace Livinia Nixon as the weeknight weather presenter for Nine News Melbourne from 18 January 2026.

== Personal life ==
On 23 December 2022, Biggs announced she was engaged to former Australian rules footballer Daniel Venables. They married in March 2023. The couple have a daughter Isla Minnie, born 7 February 2024.

Awards and achievements
Preceded by (Queensland) Jesinta Campbell	Miss Universe Australia; 2012	Succeeded by (Western Australia) Renae Ayris
Media offices
Preceded by Livinia Nixon	Nine News Melbourne; Weather presenter 2026-present	Succeeded by Incumbent
Preceded by Sally Ayhan	Nine News Perth; Weather presenter 2014–2025	Succeeded by Natalia Cooper
Preceded by New position	Nine News Late; Weather presenter (Sundays); 2020–present	Succeeded by Incumbent
