= Miss Universe Australia =

National beauty pageant competition in Australia

Miss Universe Australia Organization
- Formation: 1952; 74 years ago
- Type: Beauty pageant
- Headquarters: Perth
- Location: Australia
- Members: Miss Universe
- Official language: English
- Director: Troy Barbagallo
- Website: missuniverseaustralia.com

Miss Universe Australia is a national beauty pageant that selects Australia's representative to the Miss Universe.

== Organization ==
Miss Universe is a registered trademark owned by the Miss Universe Organization. It was owned by Donald Trump and NBC from 1996. In 2015, after Trump made statements about illegal aliens from Mexico in his presidential campaign kickoff speech, NBC ended its business relationship with Trump and stated that they will no longer air the pageant, or the Miss USA pageant, on their networks.

Since 1992, Jim Davie, a distributor of swimwear and athletic wear, has also been managing the Miss Australia Awards. In 2002, Davie obtained the licence from the Miss Universe Organisation to select Miss Universe Australia to represent Australia at international Miss Universe pageants. The new national director of the Miss Universe Australia Organisation is Troy Barbagallo of Pink Tank Events. Pink Tank have managed the Miss Universe Western Australia pageant since 2009 and was rewarded for their best in world platform with the national job in February 2016. Barbagallo is also a director of Barbagallo Group, luxury motor vehicle group and The Horologist, a leading luxury watch dealer. Barbagallo founded Box Magazine in 2003.

Miss Universe Australia is held each year to select a young woman to represent Australia at the international Miss Universe pageant. Contestants to the national pageant come from each of the States and Territories of Australia. In 2016 there are over 220 participants in the national pageant of which 30 are competing in the National Final.

== History ==
The international Miss Universe pageants started in 1952. Until 2000, while the Miss Australia Awards were held, the winners of the Miss Australia pageant would normally represent Australia at international Miss Universe pageants, but Australia did not have a representative in each year's event.

In 1952 Leah MacCartney was named as the first Miss Universe Australia. She was Miss Victoria who was later elected as Miss Universe Australia 1952 on 16 June 1952 in Melbourne.

In 1958, an independent pageant selected Miss Universe Australia. Miss Universe Australia partnered to Australian Photographic Agency (APA).

In 1964 and 1965, Miss Universe Australia was selected by the Agency casting in Melbourne.

Between 1968 and 1976, winners of Quest of Quests Dream Girl Australia represented Australia at Miss Universe.

Between 1977 and 1990, the winners of Miss Australia Beauty or Miss Universe Australia by TVW Enterprises represented Australia at Miss Universe.

There was no Australian entrant to the Miss Universe pageant in 1991 and 2001. In 2002 through 2004, the Australian representative to the Miss Universe pageant was chosen by a national pageant held in Sydney, organised by Adpro Management Group.

The national Miss Universe Australia pageant came under new management in 2005. Of the 307 who participated at the state level, 24 made it to the national pageant, and Michelle Guy became Miss Universe Australia 2005.

There have been two Miss Universe title holders representing Australia: Kerry Anne Wells in 1972 and Jennifer Hawkins in 2004. Welles entered the Miss Universe pageant as Miss Australia; Hawkins was chosen Miss Universe Australia and went on to win the Miss Universe title in Quito.

=== New owner ===
In February 2016, was announced that the new director of Miss Universe Australia is Troy Barbagallo, appointed by IMG.

== The Road to Miss Universe Australia ==
The Road to Miss Universe Australia is a television special that is broadcast on Channel 9 & 9Life. It is produced by Mathew Knight Media in partnership with Pink Tank Events.

== International crowns ==
- Two – Miss Universe winners:
  - Kerry Anne Wells (1972)
  - Jennifer Hawkins (2004)

== Gallery of winners ==
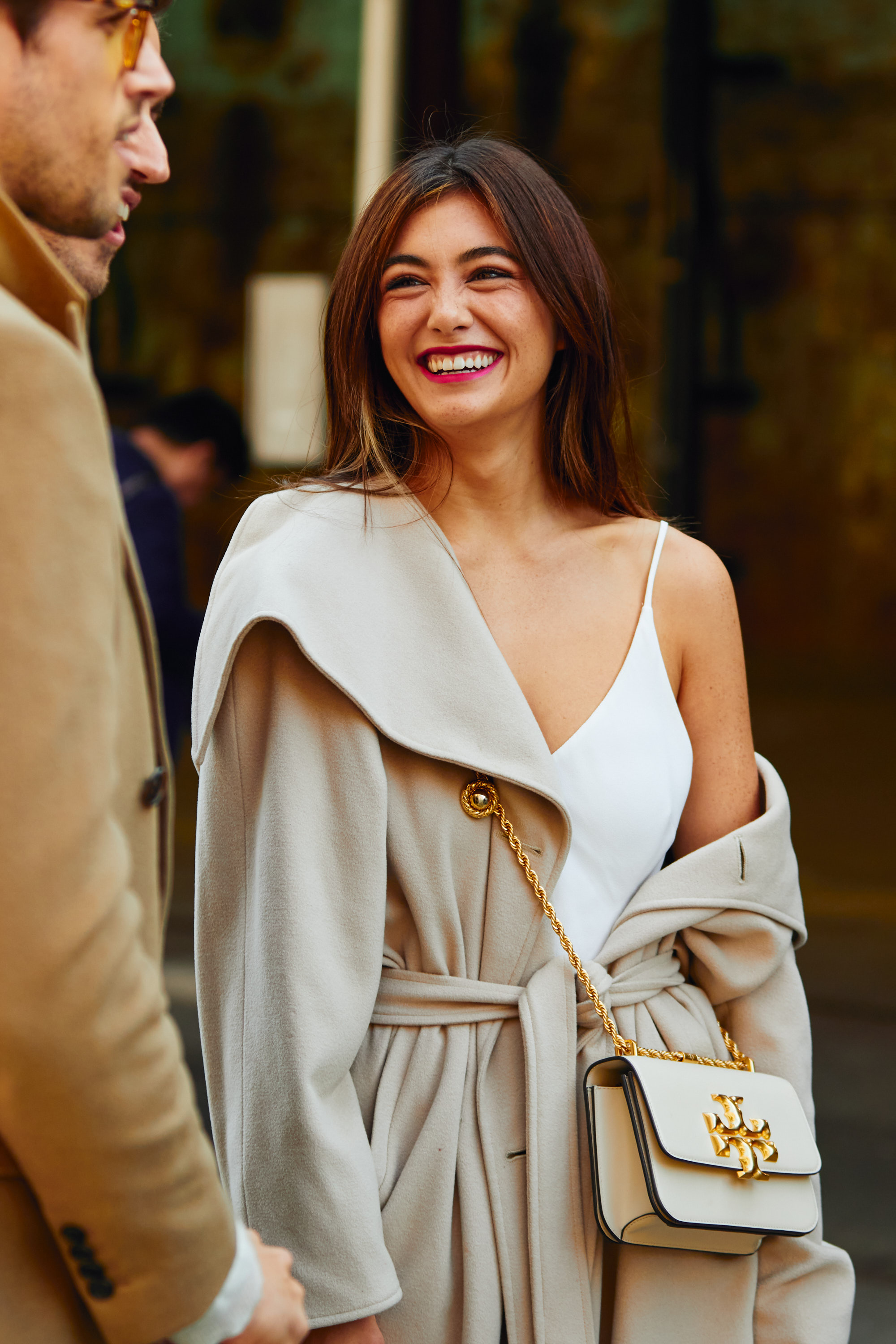
Francesca Hung, Miss Universe Australia 2018

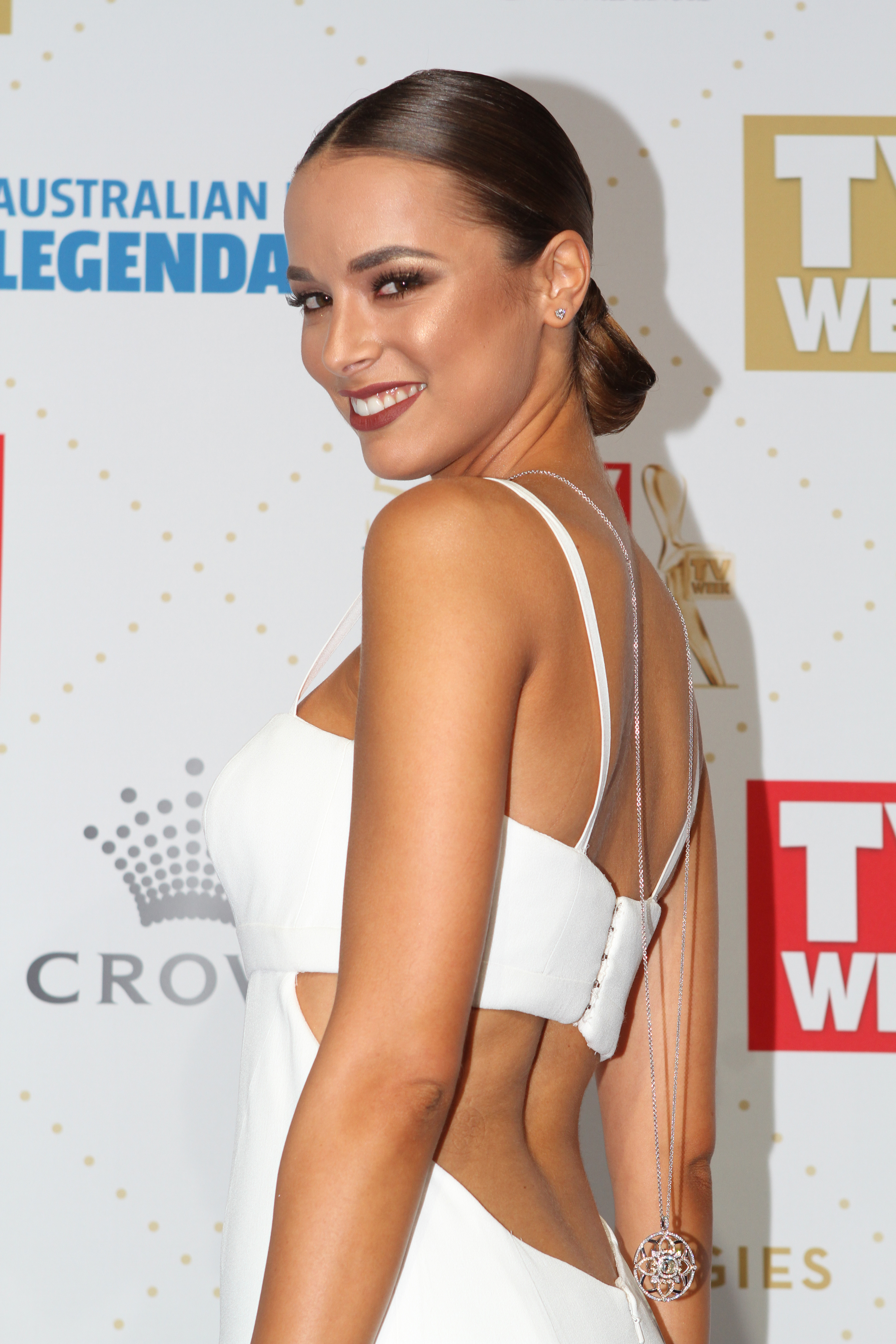
Monika Radulovic, Miss Universe Australia 2015

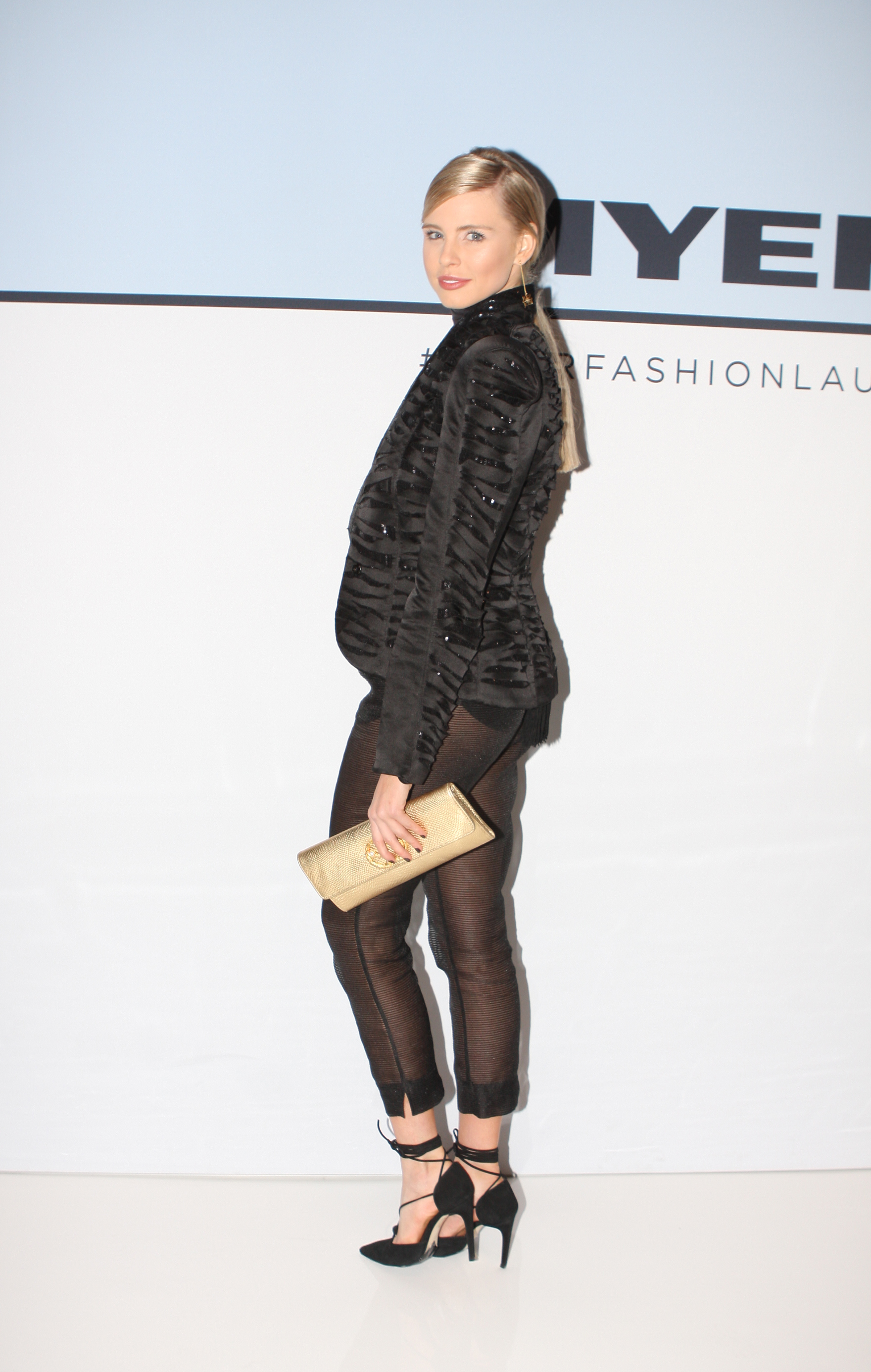
Tegan Martin, Miss Universe Australia 2014

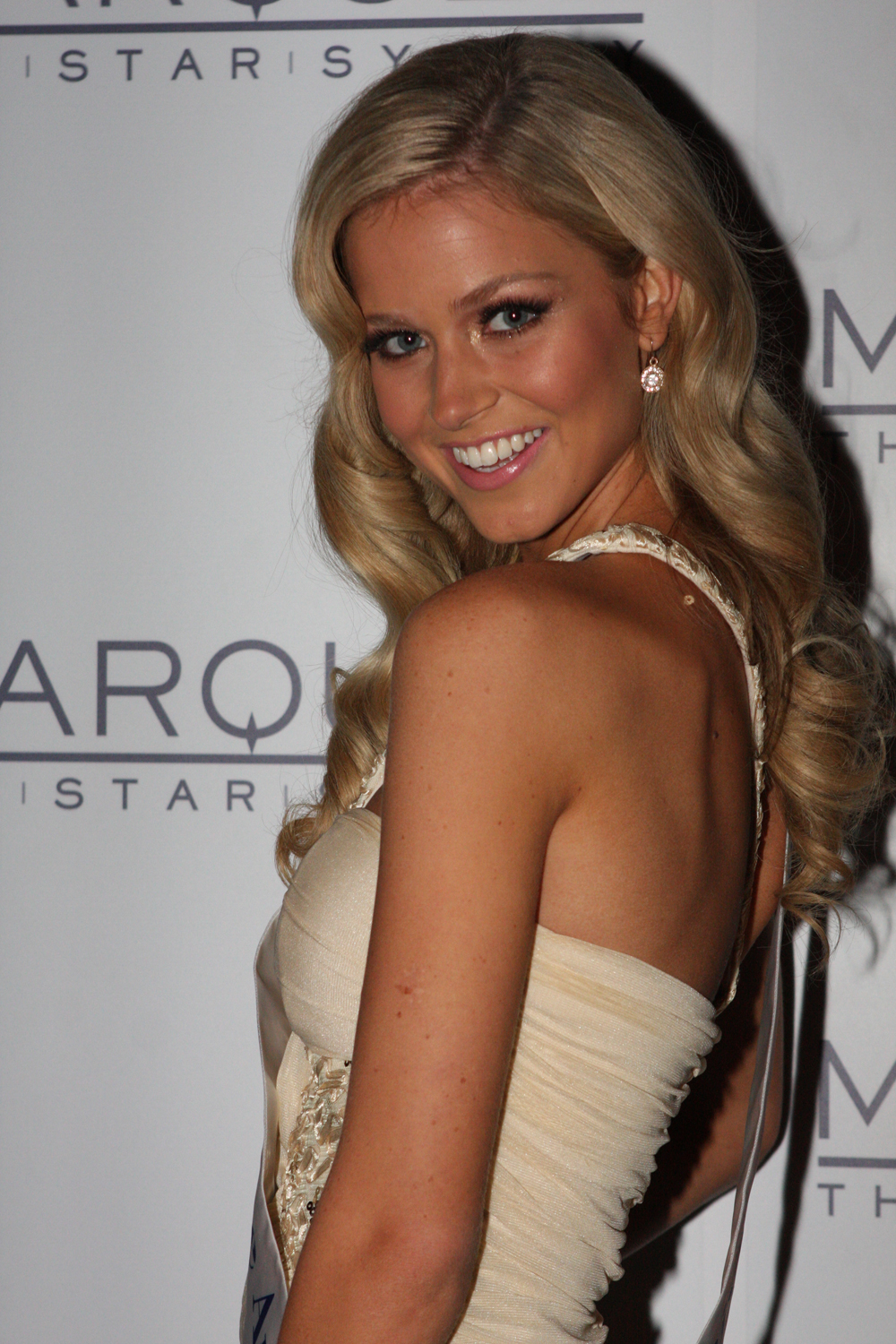
Renae Ayris, Miss Universe Australia 2012

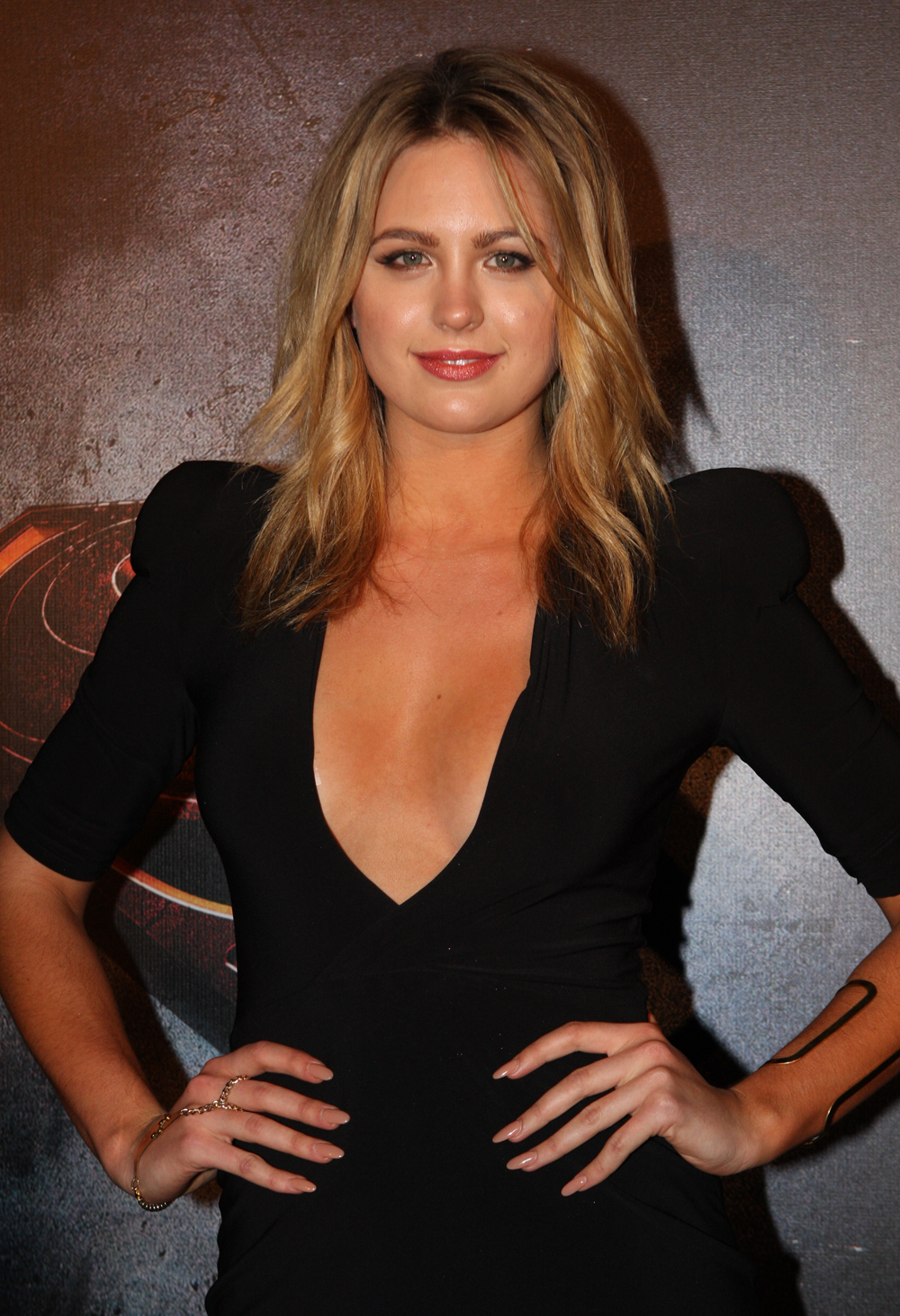
Jesinta Franklin, Miss Universe Australia 2010

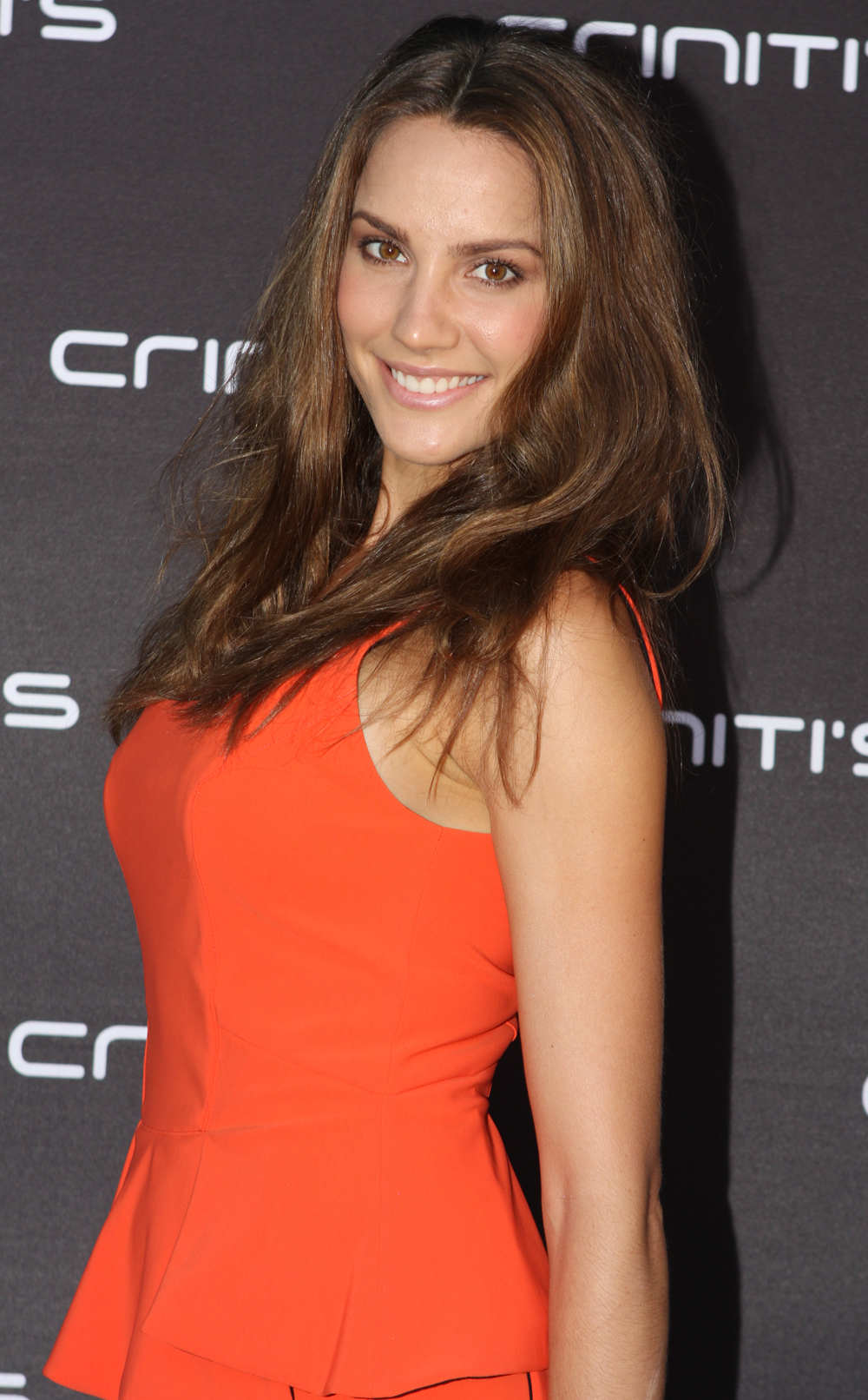
Rachael Finch, Miss Universe Australia 2009

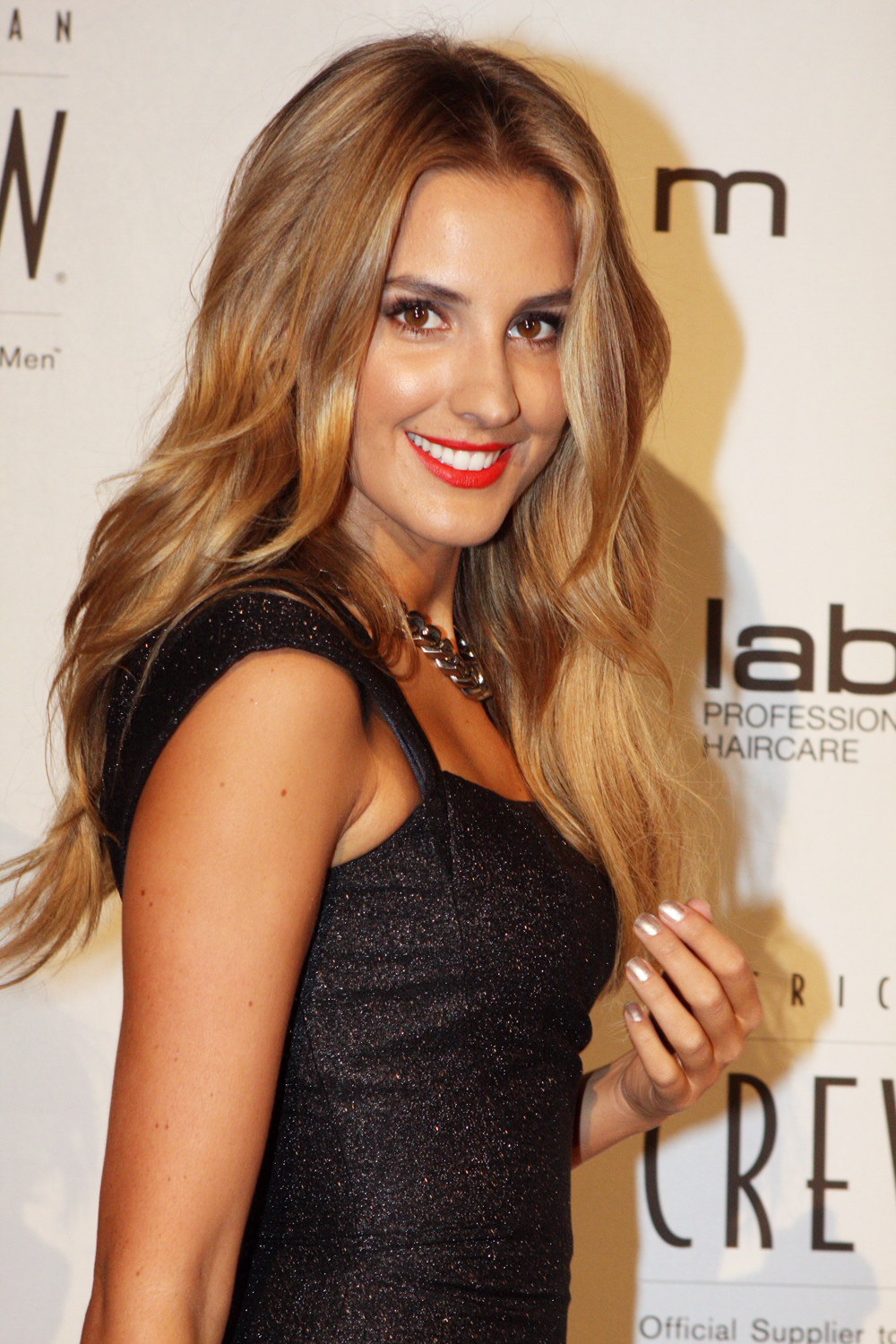
Laura Dundovic, Miss Universe Australia 2008

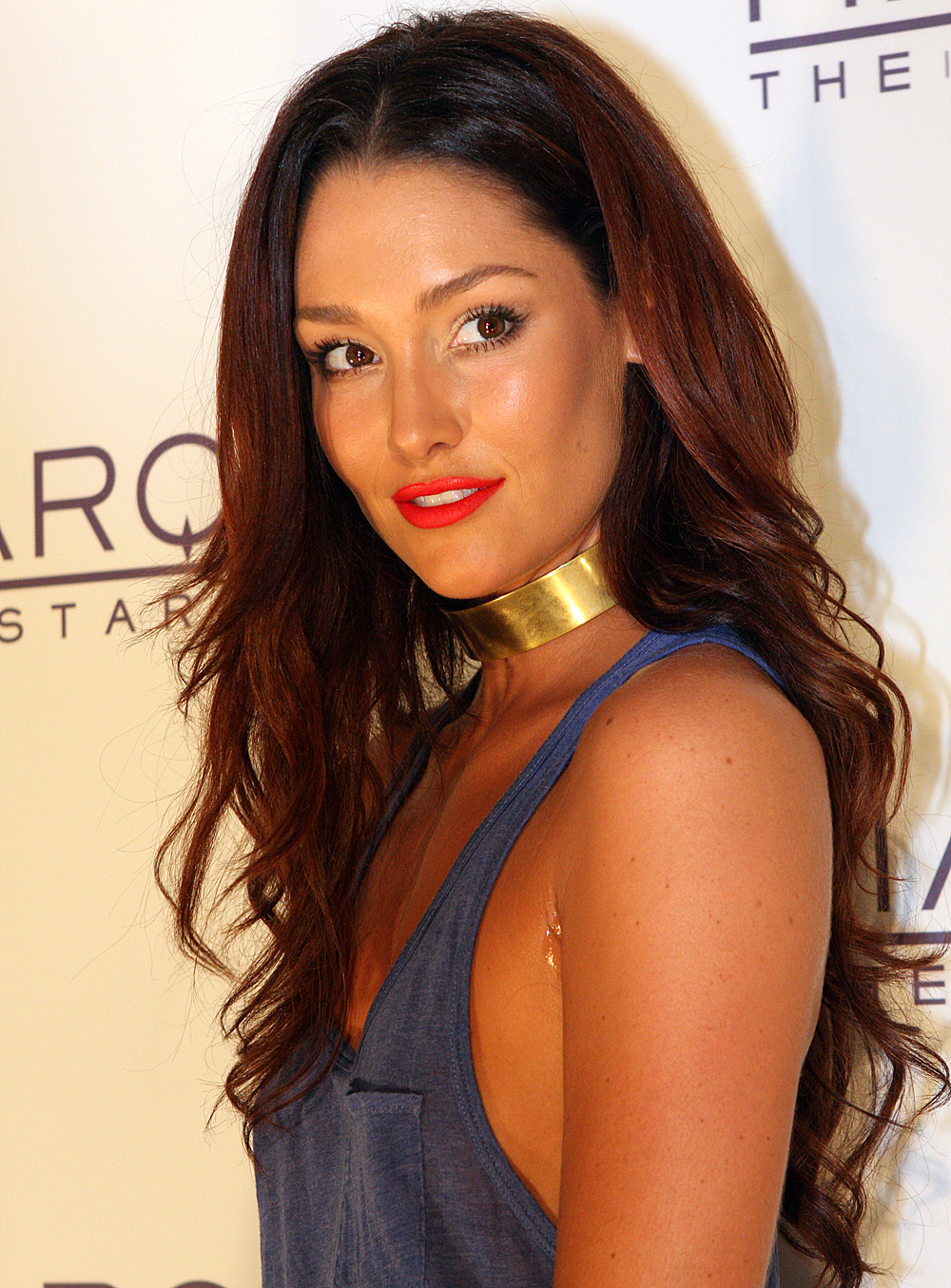
Erin McNaught, Miss Universe Australia 2006

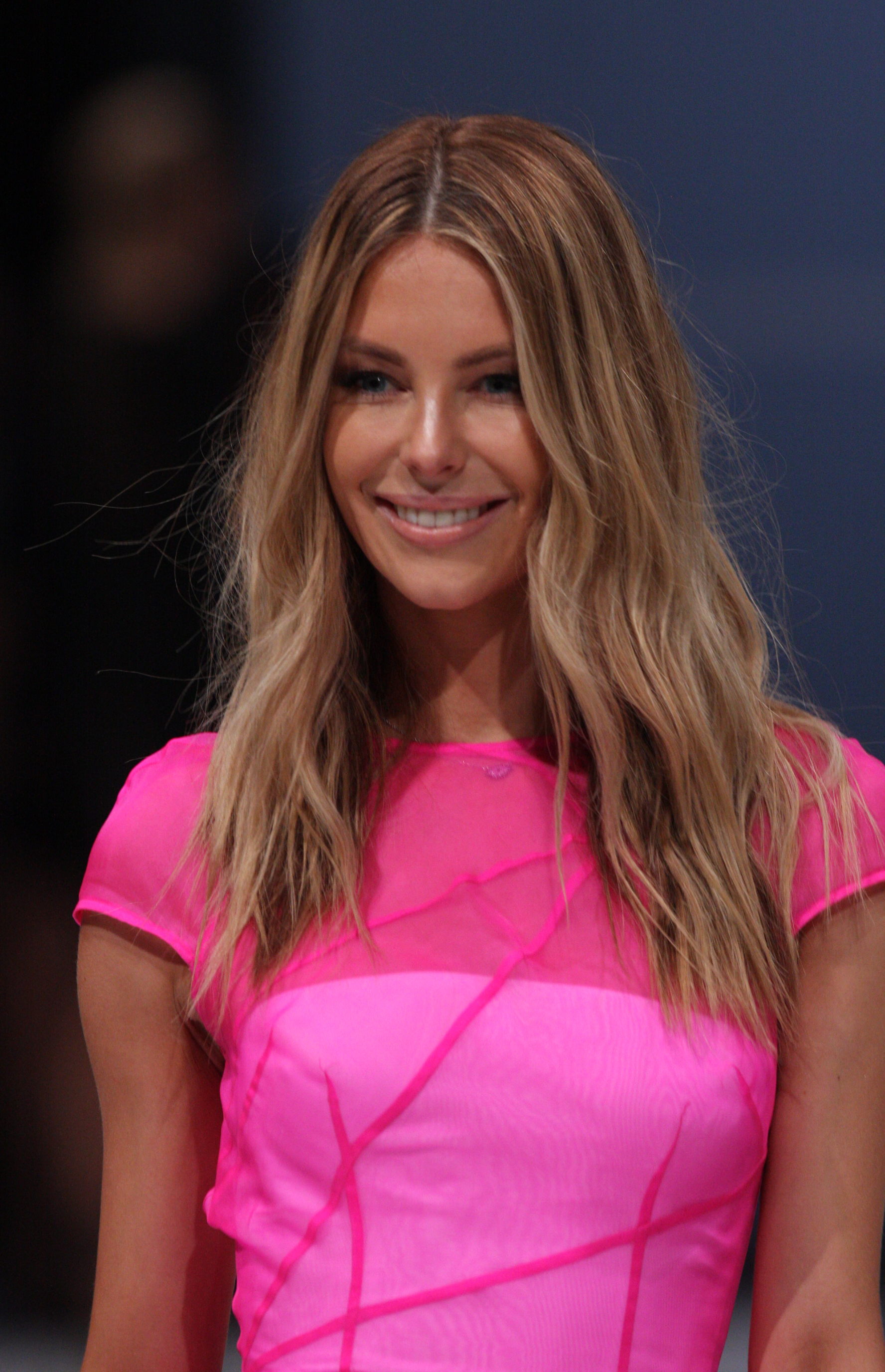
Jennifer Hawkins, Miss Universe Australia 2004 & Miss Universe 2004

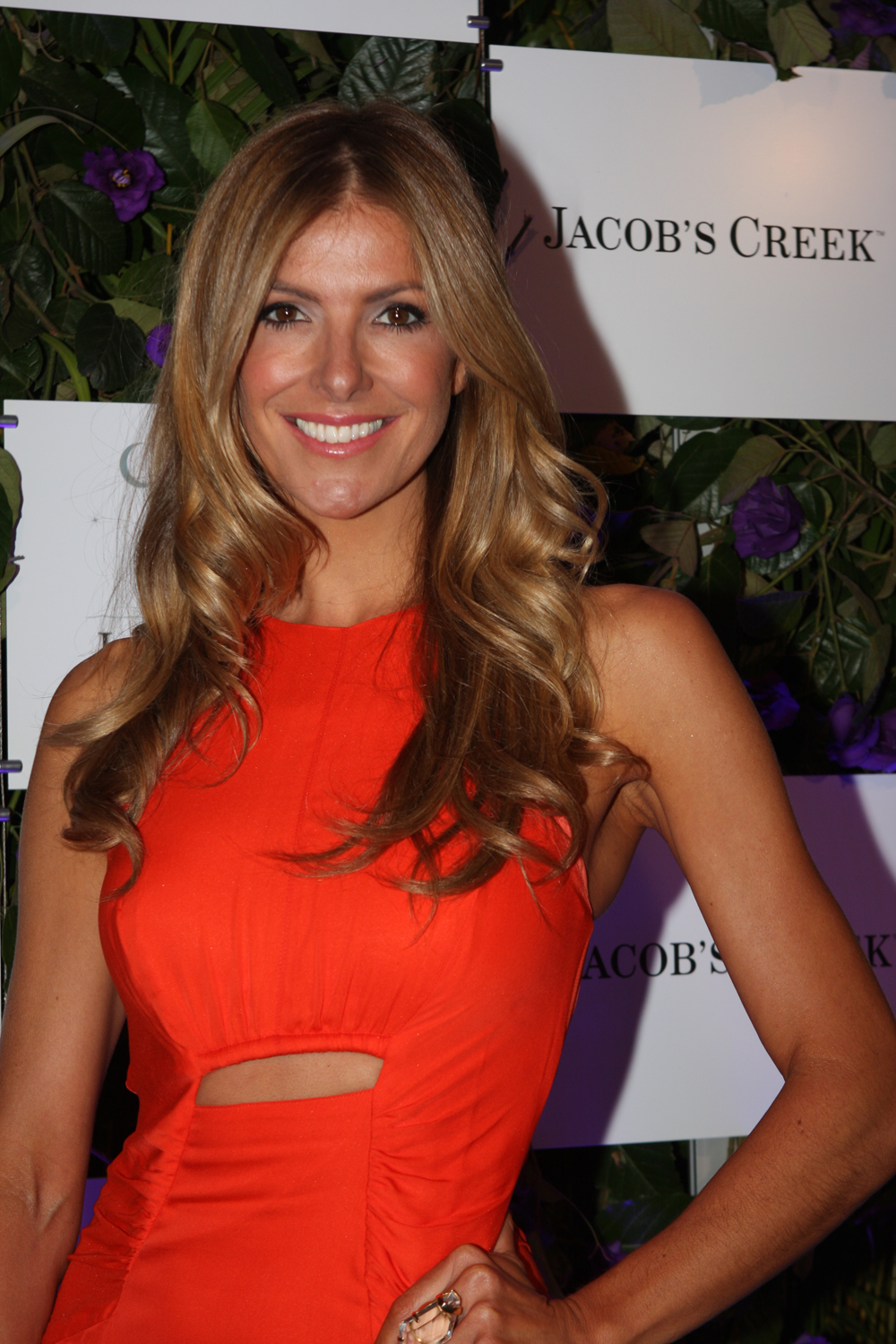
Laura Csortan, Miss Universe Australia 1997

== Titleholders ==
- : Declared as Winner
- : Ended as runner-up or top 5/6 qualification
- : Ended as one of the finalists or semifinalists
- : Ended as special awards winner

On occasion, when the winner does not qualify (due to age) for either contest, a runner-up is sent.

| Year | State | Miss Universe Australia | Placement at Miss Universe | Special awards |
Troy Barbagallo (PinkTank Events PTY Ltd.) directorship — a franchise holder to Miss Universe from 2016
| 2026 | Queensland | Caitlyn Worthington | TBA | |
| 2025 | Queensland | Lexie Brant | Unplaced | |
| 2024 | Queensland | Zoe Creed | Unplaced | |
| 2023 | Victoria | Moraya Wilson | 2nd Runner-up | |
| 2022 | New South Wales | Monique Riley | Top 16 | |
| 2021 | Victoria | Daria Varlamova | Unplaced | |
| 2020 | Victoria | Maria Thattil | Top 10 | |
| 2019 | Victoria | Priya Serrao | Unplaced | |
| 2018 | New South Wales | Francesca Hung | Top 20 | |
| 2017 | South Australia | Olivia Rogers | Unplaced | |
| 2016 | Western Australia | Caris Tiivel | Unplaced | |
Deborah Miller directorship — a franchise holder to Miss Universe between 2005―2015
| 2015 | New South Wales | Monika Radulovic | Top 5 | |
| 2014 | New South Wales | Tegan Martin | Top 10 | |
| 2013 | Victoria | Olivia Wells | Unplaced | |
| 2012 | Western Australia | Renae Ayris | 3rd Runner-up | |
| 2011 | Western Australia | Scherri-Lee Biggs | Top 10 | |
| 2010 | Queensland | Jesinta Campbell | 2nd Runner-up | Miss Congeniality |
| 2009 | Queensland | Rachael Finch | 3rd Runner-up | |
| 2008 | New South Wales | Laura Dundovic | Top 10 | |
| 2007 | Queensland | Kimberley Busteed | Unplaced | |
| 2006 | Australian Capital T. | Erin McNaught | Unplaced | |
| 2005 | Western Australia | Michelle Guy | Unplaced | |
Jim Davie and Sydney (Adpro Management Group) directorship — a franchise holder to Miss Universe between 2002―2004
| 2004 | New South Wales | Jennifer Hawkins | Miss Universe 2004 | |
| 2003 | New South Wales | Ashlea Talbot | Unplaced | |
| 2002 | Queensland | Sarah Davies | Unplaced | |
Jim Davie directorship — a franchise holder to Miss Universe between 1992―2001
Did not compete in 2001
| 2000 | New South Wales | Samantha Frost | Unplaced | |
| 1999 | New South Wales | Michelle Shead | Unplaced | |
| 1998 | Victoria | Renee Henderson | Unplaced | |
| 1997 | New South Wales | Laura Csortan | Unplaced | Miss Congeniality |
| 1996 | New South Wales | Jodie McMullen | Unplaced | Miss Congeniality |
| 1995 | New South Wales | Jacqueline Shooter | Unplaced | |
| 1994 | Queensland | Michelle van Eimeren | Unplaced | |
| 1993 | Queensland | Voni Delfos | Top 6 | |
| 1992 | Queensland | Georgina Denahy | Top 10 | |
TVW Enterprises directorship — a franchise holder to Miss Universe between 1977―1990
Did not compete in 1991
| 1990 | New South Wales | Charmaine Ware | Unplaced | |
| 1989 | New South Wales | Karen Wenden | Unplaced | Miss Photogenic |
| 1988 | New South Wales | Vanessa Lynn Gibson | Unplaced | |
| 1987 | New South Wales | Jennine Leonarder | Unplaced | |
| 1986 | New South Wales | Christina Bucat | Unplaced | |
| 1985 | Queensland | Elizabeth Bowly | Unplaced | |
| 1984 | Victoria | Donna Rudrum | Unplaced | |
| 1983 | New South Wales | Simone Cox | Unplaced | |
| 1982 | Western Australia | Lou-Anne Ronchi | Unplaced | |
| 1981 | New South Wales | Karen Sang | Unplaced | |
| 1980 | Victoria | Katrina Rose | Unplaced | |
| 1979 | Western Australia | Kerry Dunderdale | Unplaced | |
| 1978 | Victoria | Beverley Pinder | Unplaced | |
| 1977 | Victoria | Jill Maree Minahan | Unplaced | |
Waltons, a Sydney Department directorship — a franchise holder to Miss Universe between 1968―1976
| 1976 | New South Wales | Julie Anne Ismay | 4th Runner-up | |
| 1975 | New South Wales | Jennifer "Jenny" Matthews | Unplaced | |
| 1974 | Victoria | Yasmin May Nagy | Top 12 | |
| 1973 | Queensland | Susan Mainwaring | Unplaced | |
| 1972 | Western Australia | Kerry Anne Wells | Miss Universe 1972 | |
| 1971 | New South Wales | Toni Suzanne Rayward | 1st runner-up | |
| 1970 | New South Wales | Joan Lydia Zealand | 2nd runner-up | |
| 1969 | New South Wales | Joanne Barrett | 2nd runner-up | |
| 1968 | New South Wales | Lauren Jones | Unplaced | |
Moomba Festival Melbourne directorship — a franchise holder to Miss Universe between 1964―1965
Did not compete between 1966—1967
| 1965 | Victoria | Pauline Verey | Top 15 | |
| 1964 | Victoria | Maria "Ria" Luyben | Unplaced | |
Australian Photographic Agency directorship — a franchise holder to Miss Universe in 1958
Did not compete between 1959—1963
| 1958 | South Australia | Astrid Lindholm | Unplaced | Most Popular Girl |
Bernard Dowd (Dowd Associates) directorship — a franchise holder to Miss Universe between 1953―1954
Did not compete between 1955—1957
| 1954 | New South Wales | Shirley Bliss | Unplaced | |
| 1953 | New South Wales | Maxine Morgan | 4th runner-up | |
Miss Victoria Foundation directorship — a franchise holder to Miss Universe in 1952
| 1952 | Victoria | Leah McCartney | Unplaced | |

== State rankings ==
| State | Title | Year |
|---|---|---|
| New South Wales | 27 | 1953, 1954, 1968, 1969, 1970, 1971, 1975, 1976, 1981, 1983, 1986, 1987, 1988, 1989, 1990, 1995, 1996, 1997, 1999, 2000, 2003, 2004, 2008, 2014, 2015, 2018, 2022 |
| Victoria | 14 | 1952, 1964, 1965, 1974, 1977, 1978, 1980, 1984, 1998, 2013, 2019, 2020, 2021, 2023 |
| Queensland | 11 | 1973, 1985, 1992, 1993, 1994, 2002, 2007, 2009, 2010, 2024, 2025 |
| Western Australia | 6 | 1972, 1979, 2005, 2011, 2012, 2016 |
| South Australia | 3 | 1958, 1982, 2017 |
| Capital Territory | 1 | 2006 |

== See also ==
- Miss Australia
- Miss World Australia
- Miss International Australia
- Miss Earth Australia
