= Olivia Wells =

Australian beauty pageant titleholder (born 1994)

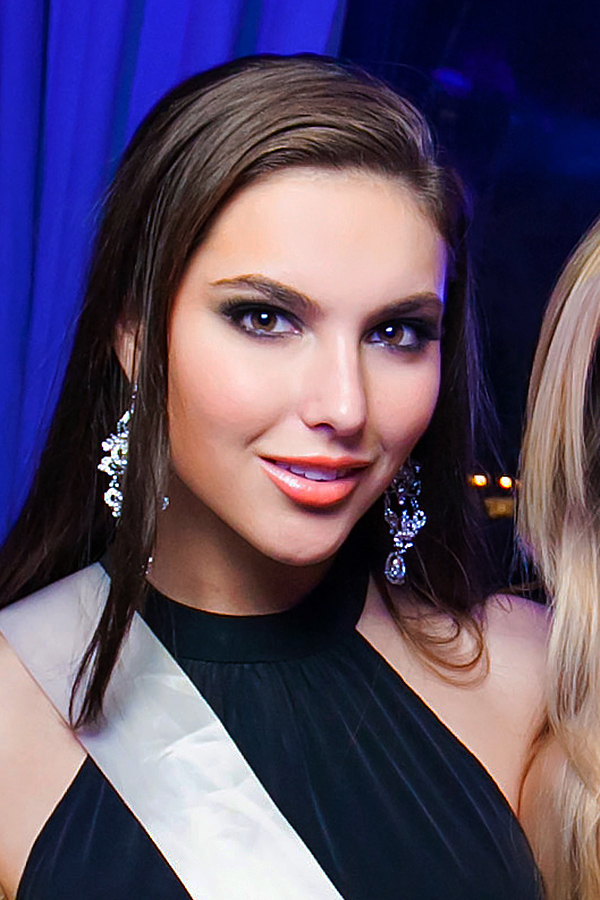
- Born: Olivia Genevieve Wells; April 29, 1994 (age 32); Melbourne, Australia
- Height: 1.78 m (5 ft 10 in)
- Beauty pageant titleholder
- Title: Miss Universe Australia 2013
- Hair color: Brown
- Eye color: Brown
- Major competitions: Miss Universe Australia 2013 (Winner); Miss Universe 2013 (Unplaced)

Olivia Genevieve Wells (born 29 April 1994 in Melbourne) is an Australian philanthropist and beauty pageant titleholder who was crowned Miss Universe Australia 2013 and represented Australia at Miss Universe 2013 in Moscow, Russia on 9 November 2013.

== Early life ==
Wells grew up in the Bayside suburb of Black Rock with her family. Her primary and secondary education was completed Loreto Mandeville Hall. During her school years she excelled academically winning the Victorian Premier's Spirit of ANZAC Prize in 2010 and was accepted into the Kwong Le Dow Young Scholars Program at Melbourne University in 2011. Wells completed high school in 2012 and is a medical student at Monash University in Melbourne. After winning Miss Universe Australia 2013 she took a one-year intermission from her studies.

== Miss Universe pageant ==
The Miss Universe Australia pageant was the first pageant Wells competed in; representing her home state of Victoria and was crowned Miss Universe Australia 2013. She beat out 29 other national finalists from all over the continent. Wells was an underdog in the lead up to the national pageant with betting odds at 51:1 for her taking the title.

Wells represented Australia at the Miss Universe 2013 pageant on 9 November 2013 in Moscow. Although considered a favourite, she failed to place in the semifinals, ending Australia's five-year streak of consecutive placements in Miss Universe, from 2008 through 2012.

== Career ==
Wells is an active philanthropist and regularly volunteers her time both locally and internationally. Most notably, Wells is an ambassador for Operation Smile Australia and has participated in a mission in Lima Peru. Wells is also an ambassador for the Royal Children's Hospital in Melbourne, Australia. As outlined in her answer to her final five question at the Miss Universe Australia pageant, Wells also volunteers weekly with Embrace Education, tutoring English as a second language to children from underprivileged migrant and refugee backgrounds. Since 2014, Wells has also been an ambassador for the Robert Connor Dawes Foundation and participated in their event Connor's Run, Australia's largest event for paediatric brain cancer.

Awards and achievements
Preceded by (Western Australia) Renae Ayris	Miss Universe Australia; 2013	Succeeded by (New South Wales) Tegan Martin
