= Miss Universe Australia 2017 =

Beauty pageant edition

- Date: 29 June 2017
- Presenters: Ash Williams; Olivia Wells
- Venue: Sofitel Melbourne on Collins, Melbourne
- Entrants: 32
- Placements: 15
- Winner: Olivia Rogers; South Australia
- Miss Toybox: Grady Wulff, Western Australia
- Social Networker: Grady Wulff, Western Australia

Miss Universe Australia 2017, the 13th Miss Universe Australia pageant, was held on 29 June 2017 at Sofitel Melbourne on Collins in Melbourne. Thirty-two contestants from different states in Australia competed. Reigning Miss Universe Australia, Caris Tiivel of Western Australia crowned her successor, Olivia Molly Rogers of South Australia at the end of the event. Olivia Rogers represented Australia in Miss Universe 2017 pageant.

== Results ==
=== Placements ===
Placement	Contestant
Miss Universe Australia 2017	South Australia – Olivia Rogers
1st Runner-Up	New South Wales – Georgie Mitchelle
2nd Runner-Up	New South Wales – Tahlia Giumelli
3rd Runner-Up	Victoria – Marijana Radmanović
4th Runner-Up	South Australia – Erin Scott
Top 10	Northern Territory – Ashton Carbone; Tasmania – Brooke Rogers; Victoria – Nikola Sonerson; Victoria – Naomi Holt; Western Australia – Kate Hedges
Top 15	Northern Territory – Artia Ratahi; Queensland – Laura Hanlon; Tasmania – Emma Field; Western Australia – Jordy Kuriata; Western Australia – Grady Wulff

== Special awards ==
Final results	Contestant
Social Networker Award	Western Australia – Grady Wulff
ToyBox International Charity Ambassador	Western Australia – Grady Wulff

== Contestants ==
32 confirmed finalists for Miss Universe Australia 2017

Represents	Contestant	Age	Height	Hometown
South Australia	Stella Badenoch	26	1.78 m (5 ft 10 in)	Adelaide
Victoria	Tarrah Alexandria Burns	23	1.82 m (5 ft 11 1/2 in)	Melbourne
Western Australia	Danica Butler	22	1.81 m (5 ft 11 1/2 in)	Perth
Northern Territory	Ashton Carbone	19	1.81 m (5 ft 11 1/2 in)	Darwin
Queensland	Elise Chambellant	26	1.75 m (5 ft 9 in)	Newcastle
Queensland	Monique Evren	22	1.75 m (5 ft 9 in)	Brisbane
Tasmania	Emma Field	27	1.76 m (5 ft 9 1/2 in)	Hobart
New South Wales	Tahlia Giumelli	23	1.76 m (5 ft 9 1/2 in)	Woollahra
New South Wales	Georgia Gravanis	21	1.75 m (5 ft 9 in)	Sydney
Queensland	Laura Hanlon	25	1.78 m (5 ft 10 in)	Newcastle
Western Australia	Kate Hedges	23	1.84 m (6 ft 1/2 in)	Perth
Western Australia	Laine Hoffman	19	1.75 m (5 ft 9 in)	Perth
Victoria	Naomi Holt	18	1.81 m (5 ft 11 1/2 in)	Melbourne
Victoria	Genie Koulaeva	25	1.83 m (6 ft 0 in)	Melbourne
Western Australia	Jordy Kuriata	27	1.83 m (6 ft 0 in)	Perth
Victoria	Sally Kurzke	22	1.80 m (5 ft 11 in)	Melbourne
Queensland	Serena Lyle	18	1.82 m (5 ft 11 1/2 in)	Brisbane
New South Wales	Alecia McCallum	21	1.78 m (5 ft 10 in)	Sydney
New South Wales	Georgie Mitchell	24	1.78 m (5 ft 10 in)	Sydney
Queensland	Chelsey Brooke Nichols	27	1.82 m (5 ft 11 1/2 in)	Newcastle
Western Australia	Laura O’Neill	26	1.77 m (5 ft 9 1/2 in)	Perth
Victoria	Elana Philbert	19	1.80 m (5 ft 11 in)	Melbourne
Victoria	Marijana Radmanović	26	1.83 m (6 ft 0 in)	Melbourne
Northern Territory	Artia Ratahi	21	1.69 m (5 ft 6 1/2 in)	Darwin
South Australia	Tharika Rodrigo	26	1.78 m (5 ft 10 in)	Adelaide
Tasmania	Brooke Rogers	23	1.83 m (6 ft 0 in)	Hobart
South Australia	Olivia Molly Rogers	25	1.76 m (5 ft 9 1/2 in)	Adelaide
South Australia	Erin Scott	25	1.75 m (5 ft 9 in)	Adelaide
New South Wales	Jordan Simmonds	19	1.78 m (5 ft 10 in)	Sydney
Victoria	Nikola Sonerson	25	1.81 m (5 ft 11 1/2 in)	Melbourne
Western Australia	Olivia Stanley	23	1.82 m (5 ft 11 1/2 in)	Perth
Western Australia	Grady Wulff	18	1.82 m (5 ft 11 1/2 in)	Perth
