= Wollun, New South Wales =

Wollun
- Town
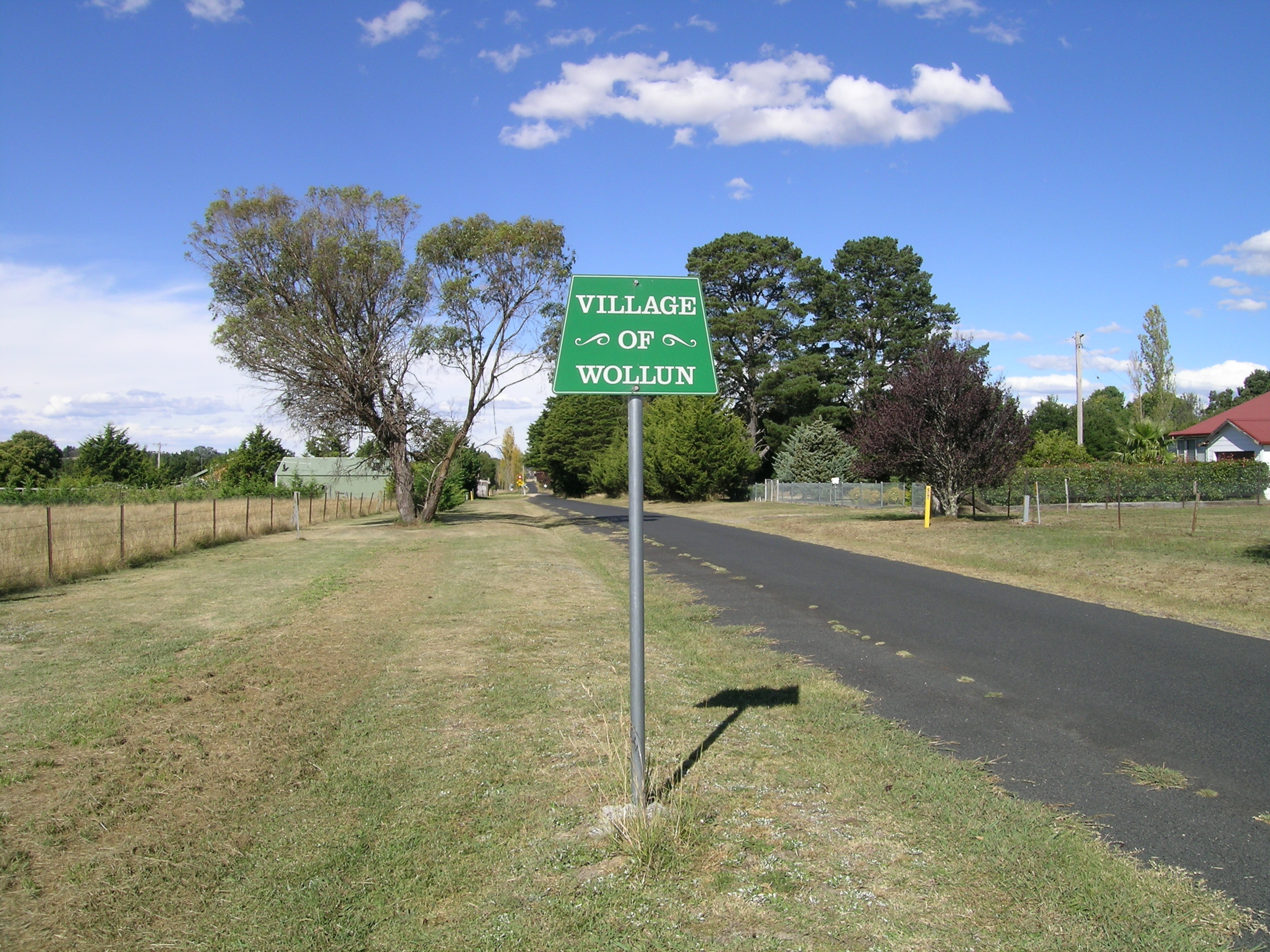
- The village of Wollun

- Coordinates: 30°50′S 151°26′E
- Country: Australia
- State: New South Wales
- LGA: Uralla Shire
- Location: 451 km (280 mi) N of Sydney; 50 km (31 mi) S of Armidale; 26 km (16 mi) NW of Walcha; 11 km (6.8 mi) S of Kentucky

Government
  - State electorate: Northern Tablelands
  - Federal division: New England
- Elevation: 1,111 m (3,645 ft)

Population
  - Total: 67 (2016 census)
- Postcode: 2354
- County: Sandon

Wollun is a small rural community about 26 kilometres north-west of Walcha and is included in the Uralla Shire local government area of the Northern Tablelands region of New South Wales, Australia.

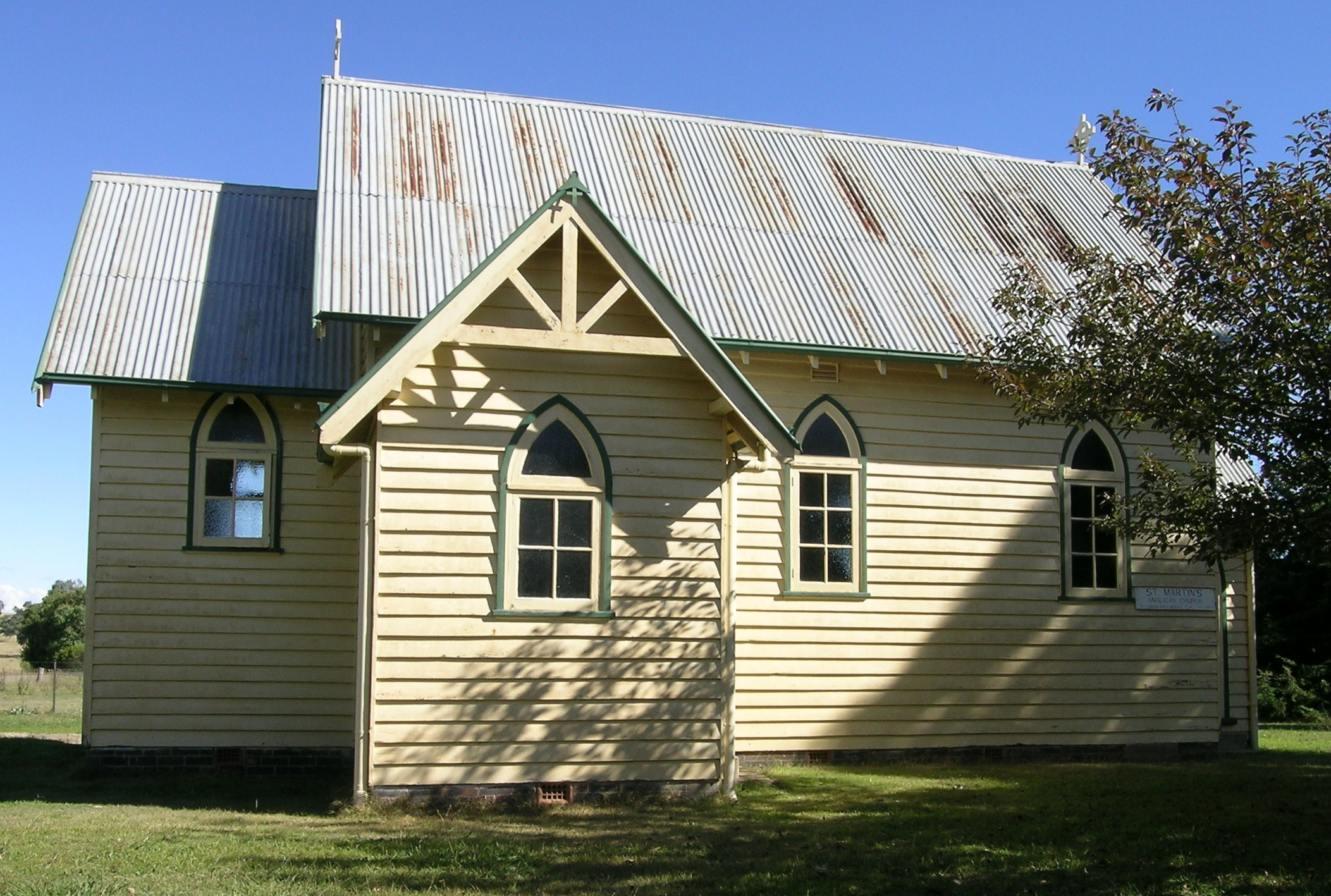
St Martin's Church, Wollun

Wollun was linked by rail to Sydney in 1882 as part of the Main North Line and on 20 February 1975 the link closed with access only possible at Uralla or Walcha Road.

Wollun Post Office opened on 16 January 1892 and closed in 1977 (it was known as Wollun Platform between 1897 and 1914).

The settlement currently comprises several houses and a church. The principal local industry is sheep and beef cattle breeding. Every two years some local Merino studs display their sheep at the New England Merino Field Days.

Preceding station	Former services	Following station
Kentucky South towards Wallangarra	Main Northern Line	Walcha Road towards Sydney
