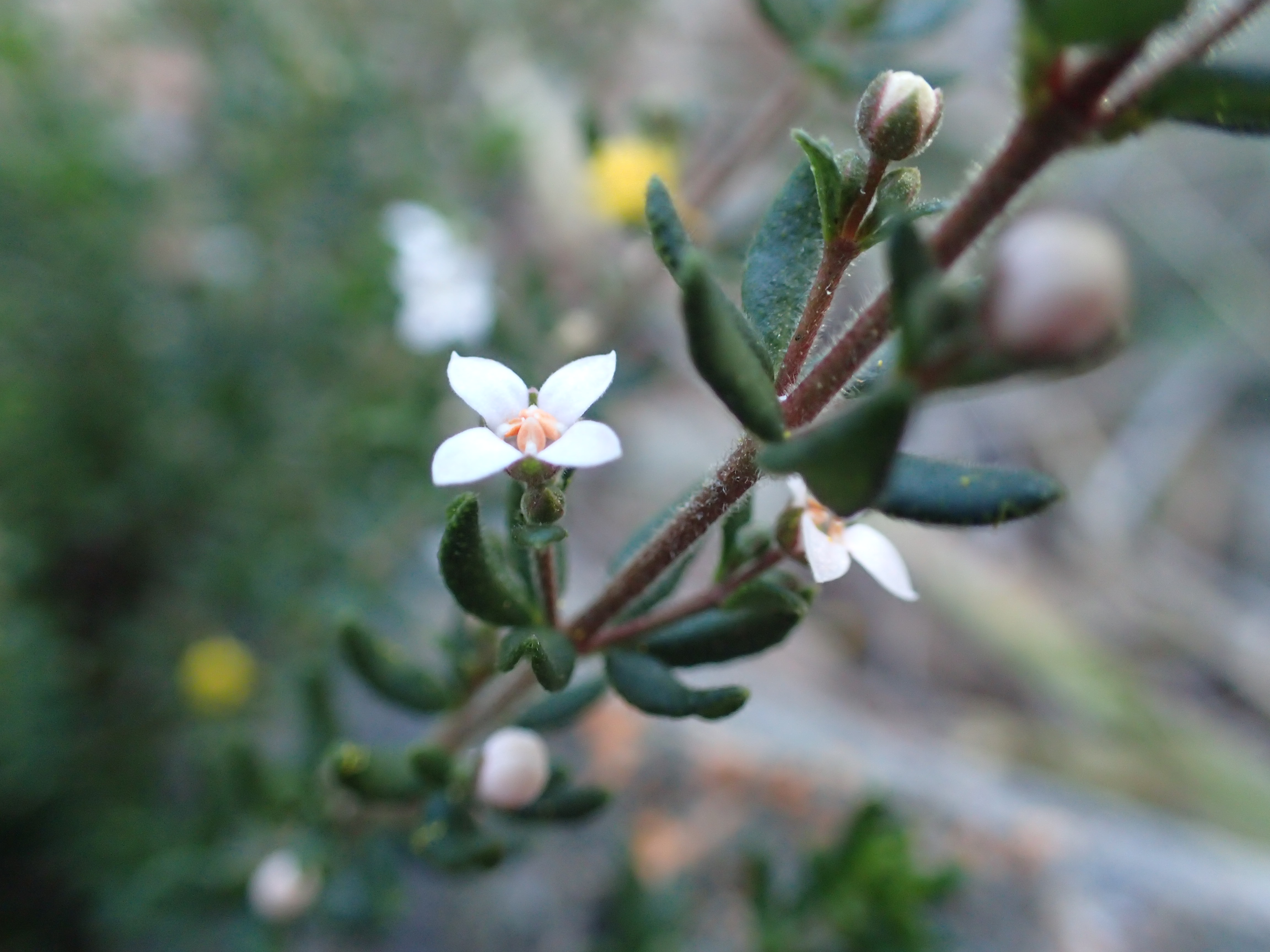
- Near Invergowrie

Scientific classification
- Kingdom: Plantae
- Clade: Tracheophytes
- Clade: Angiosperms
- Clade: Eudicots
- Clade: Rosids
- Order: Sapindales
- Family: Rutaceae
- Genus: Zieria
- Species: Z. odorifera

Binomial name
- Zieria odorifera J.A.Armstr.

= Zieria odorifera =

Fragrant zieria

Species of flowering plant

Zieria odorifera, commonly known as the fragrant zieria, is a plant in the citrus family Rutaceae and is endemic to inland New South Wales. It is an aromatic shrub with ridged branches, leaves composed of three leaflets and groups of mostly three pale to deep pink, four-petalled flowers in spring.

== Description ==
Zieria odorifera is an aromatic shrub which grows to a height of 1 m (3 ft) and has ridged, more or less glabrous branches. The leaves are composed of three elliptic to egg-shaped leaflets with the narrower end towards the base. The central leaflet is 5–7 mm (0.2–0.3 in) long and 2–3 mm (0.08–0.1 in) wide, the leaves with a petiole 0.5–2 mm (0.02–0.08 in) long. The leaflets are glabrous except when young and the upper surface is a darker green than the lower one. The flowers are pale to deep pink and are arranged in upper leaf axils in groups of three or more and the groups are mostly longer than the leaves. There are four triangular sepal lobes about 2 mm (0.08 in) long and four petals about 4 mm (0.2 in) long. The petals are covered with soft hairs on the outside but glabrous on the inner surface. In common with other zierias, there are only four stamens. Flowering occurs in spring.

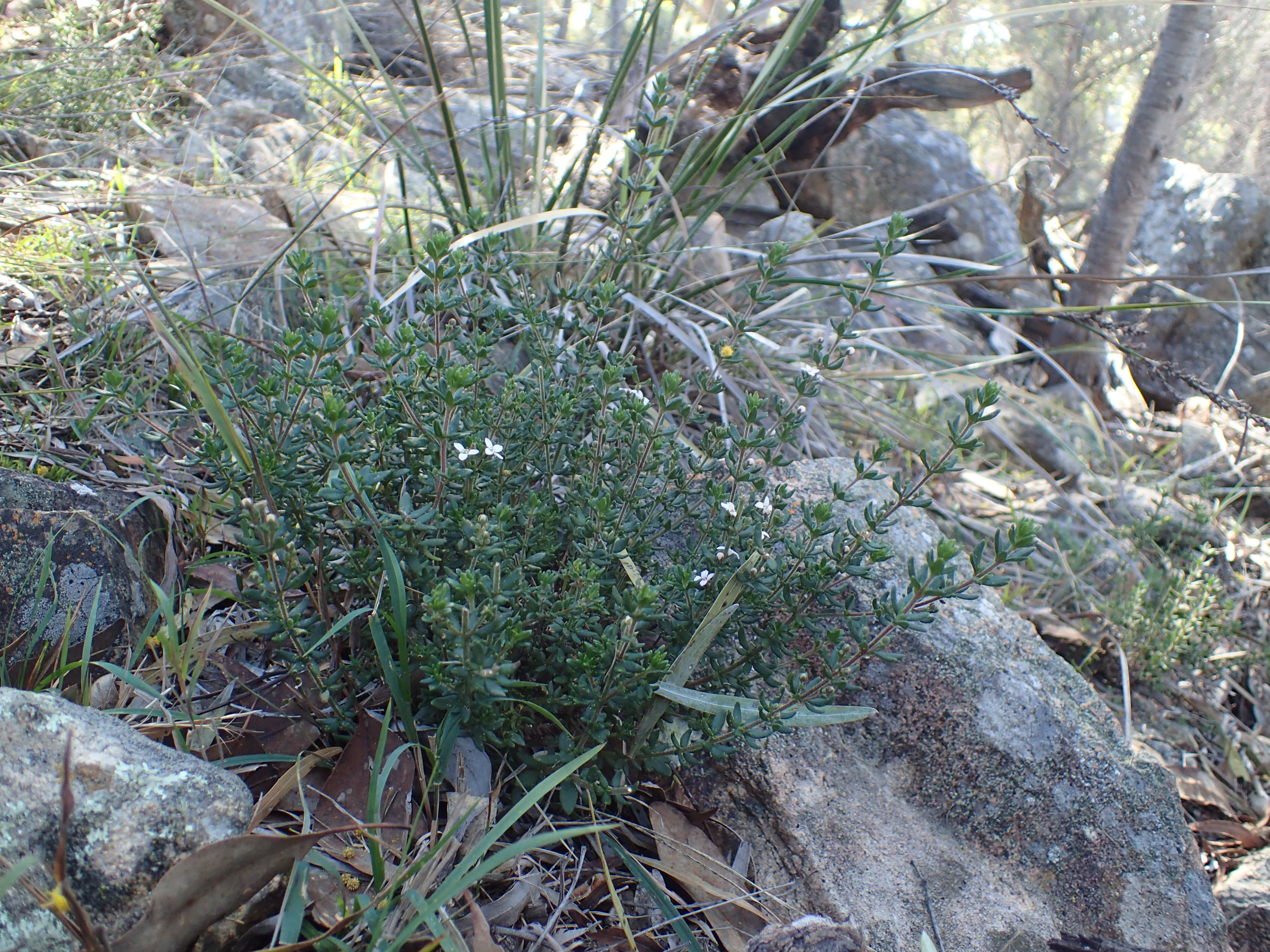
Habit

== Taxonomy and naming ==
Zieria odorifera was first formally described in 2002 by James Armstrong and the description was published in Australian Systematic Botany from a specimen collected in the Warrumbungles. The specific epithet (odorifera) is a Latin word meaning "having a smell".

In 2008, Marco Duretto and Paul Irwin Forster described four subspecies and the names have been accepted by the Australian Plant Census:

- Zieria odorifera subsp. copelandii Duretto & P.I.Forst. has glabrous petals;
- Zieria odorifera J.A.Armstr. subsp. odorifera has branches that are hairy but not with star-like hairs, sepals 1–2 mm (0.039–0.079 in) long and petals that hairy on the lower side and usually 4–4.5 mm (0.16–0.18 in) long;
- Zieria odorifera subsp. warrabahensis Duretto & P.I.Forst. has hairy branches with mainly star-like hairs, sepals about 1 mm (0.039 in) long and petals that are hairy on the lower side;
- Zieria odorifera subsp. williamsii Duretto & P.I.Forst. has branches that are hairy but not with star-like hairs, sepals 1–2 mm (0.039–0.079 in) long and petals that are hairy on the lower side and usually 2–2.5 mm (0.079–0.098 in) long.

== Distribution and habitat ==
This zieria grows in heath on rocky ridges and between rock outcrops. Subspecies copelandii is only known from Mount Kaputar National Park in the Warrumbungles, subspecies odorifera mainly in the Warrumbungle National Park, subspecies warrabahensis the Warrabah National Park and subspecies williamsii in scattered locations between Cathedral Rock National Park and the Oxley Wild Rivers National Park.
