= Rocky River (New South Wales) =

Coordinates: 30°37′S 151°30′E

Rocky River Gwydir River
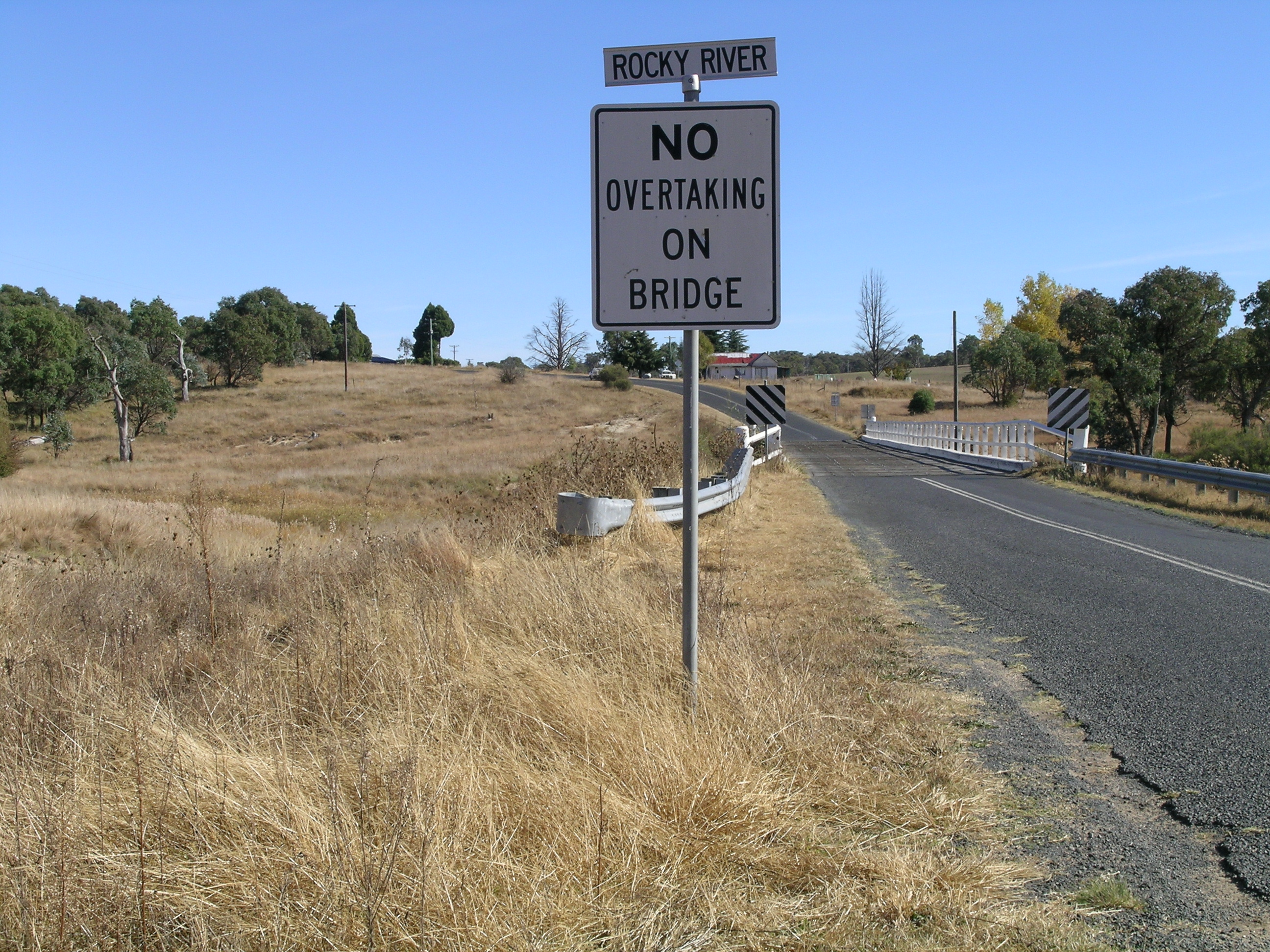
- Thunderbolts Way crossing Rocky River at Uralla

Location
- Country: Australia
- State: New South Wales
- Region: IBRA: New England Tablelands
- District: Northern Tablelands
- Municipality: Uralla

Physical characteristics
- Source: Kentucky Creek
  - location: Rocky River, west of Uralla
  - elevation: 977 m (3,205 ft)
- Mouth: confluence with Boorolong Creek to form Gwydir River
  - location: south of Yarrowyck
  - elevation: 754 m (2,474 ft)
- Length: 34 km (21 mi)

Basin features
- River system: Gwydir River, Murray–Darling basin

Rocky River, a watercourse of the Gwydir catchment within the Murray–Darling basin, is located in the Northern Tablelands district of New South Wales, Australia.

Sourced from the western slopes of the Great Dividing Range, the river rises at First Creek Falls on Kentucky Creek, at Rocky River, west of Uralla, and flows generally to the north and north-west, before reaching its confluence with the Boorolong Creek to form Gwydir River, south of Yarrowyck, descending 223 metres (732 ft) over its 34 kilometres (21 mi) course.

== See also ==
- Rivers of New South Wales
- List of rivers of Australia
