= McCrossin (surname) =

McCrossin is a surname of Scottish origin. It is similar to McCrossan.

== List of people with the surname ==
- Elizabeth Smith-McCrossin (born 1969), Canadian politician
- Judi McCrossin, Australian TV and film scriptwriter
- Julie McCrossin (born 1954), Australian radio broadcaster, journalist, comedian, political commentator

== See also ==
- McCrossins Mill
