= Yarrowyck, New South Wales =

Yarrowyck New South Wales
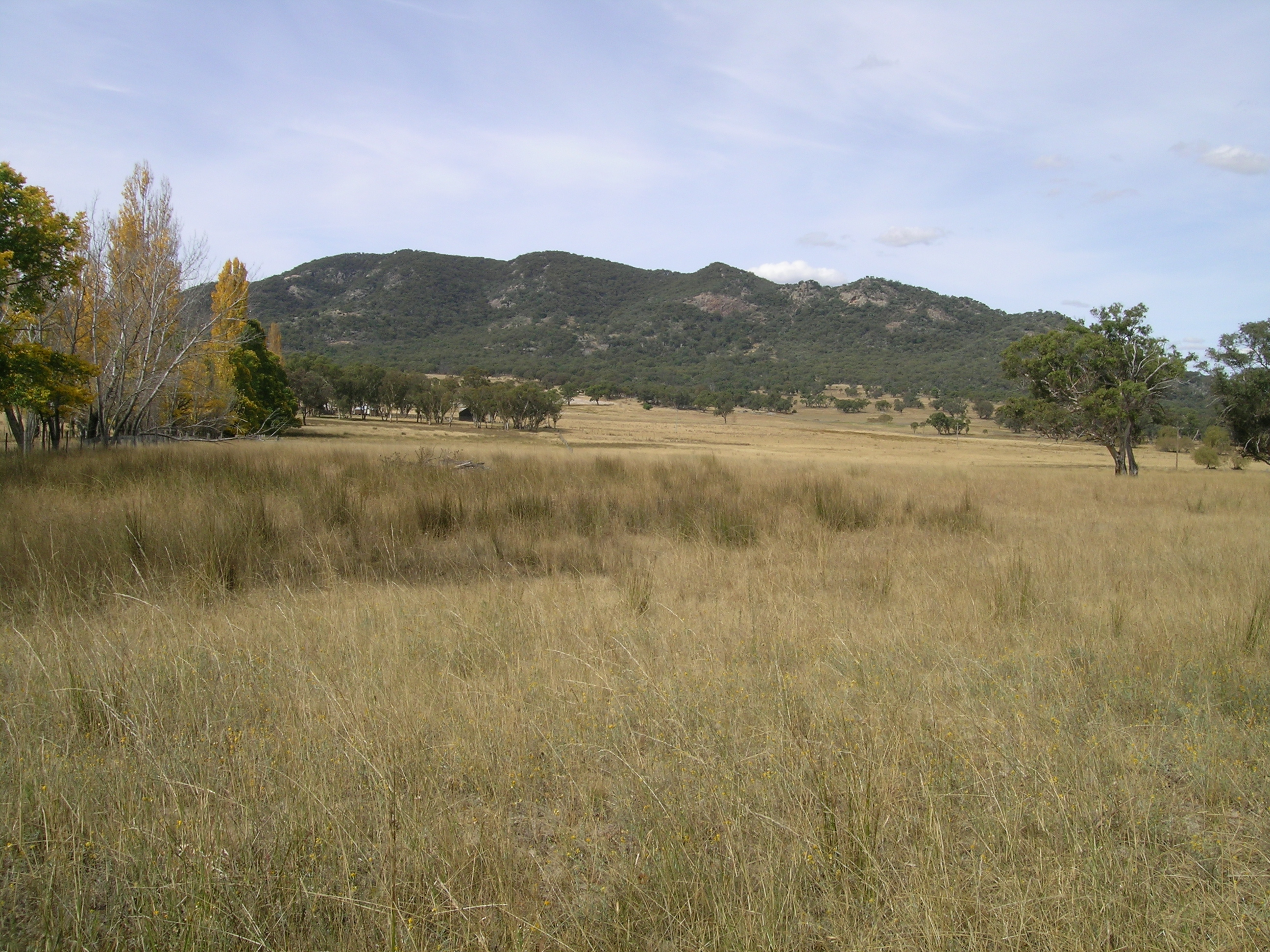
- Mount Yarrowyck

- Coordinates: 30°27′S 151°21′E
- Population: 136 (2006 census)
- Postcode(s): 2358
- Elevation: 770 m (2,526 ft)
- Location: 23 km (14 mi) NW of Uralla; 31 km (19 mi) W of Armidale.
- LGA(s): Uralla Shire
- State electorate(s): Northern Tablelands
- Federal division(s): New England

Yarrowyck is a rural locality on the western slopes of the Northern Tablelands, New South Wales, Australia.

Yarrowyck is located in Uralla Shire and in Sandon County. The locality is about 23 kilometres north west of Uralla on Thunderbolts Way and about 31 kilometres west of the city of Armidale. Yarrowyck is an agricultural area with mostly sheep and beef cattle breeding and grazing activities in the valley of the Rocky River.

== History ==
Historically a small village, there are now only scattered agricultural properties, and a timber church that is now a private residence. There was a small cemetery located near the Gwydir River on the property Riverview. It is believed that about ten people were buried there but the headstones have now disappeared. The church hall was built c. 1910 and used for Protestant services and public meetings. The Yarrowyck region had a population of 136 people, (53.0% male, 47.0% female) in the 2006 census.

== Mount Yarrowyck Nature Reserve ==
The Mount Yarrowyck Nature Reserve near the junction of Bundarra Road and Thunderbolts Way protects an Aboriginal cave painting site and much of the natural environment of Mount Yarrowyck. The reserve's Aboriginal cultural walk, a 3-kilometre (1.9 mi) return track, runs along the granite slopes of the mountain to the cave painting site. The track passes through one of the few remnants of natural bushland on the western slopes of the New England Tablelands. The walking track is clear and easy to follow and, apart from one short section, is level and undemanding.
