= Kingstown, New South Wales =

Kingstown
- Town
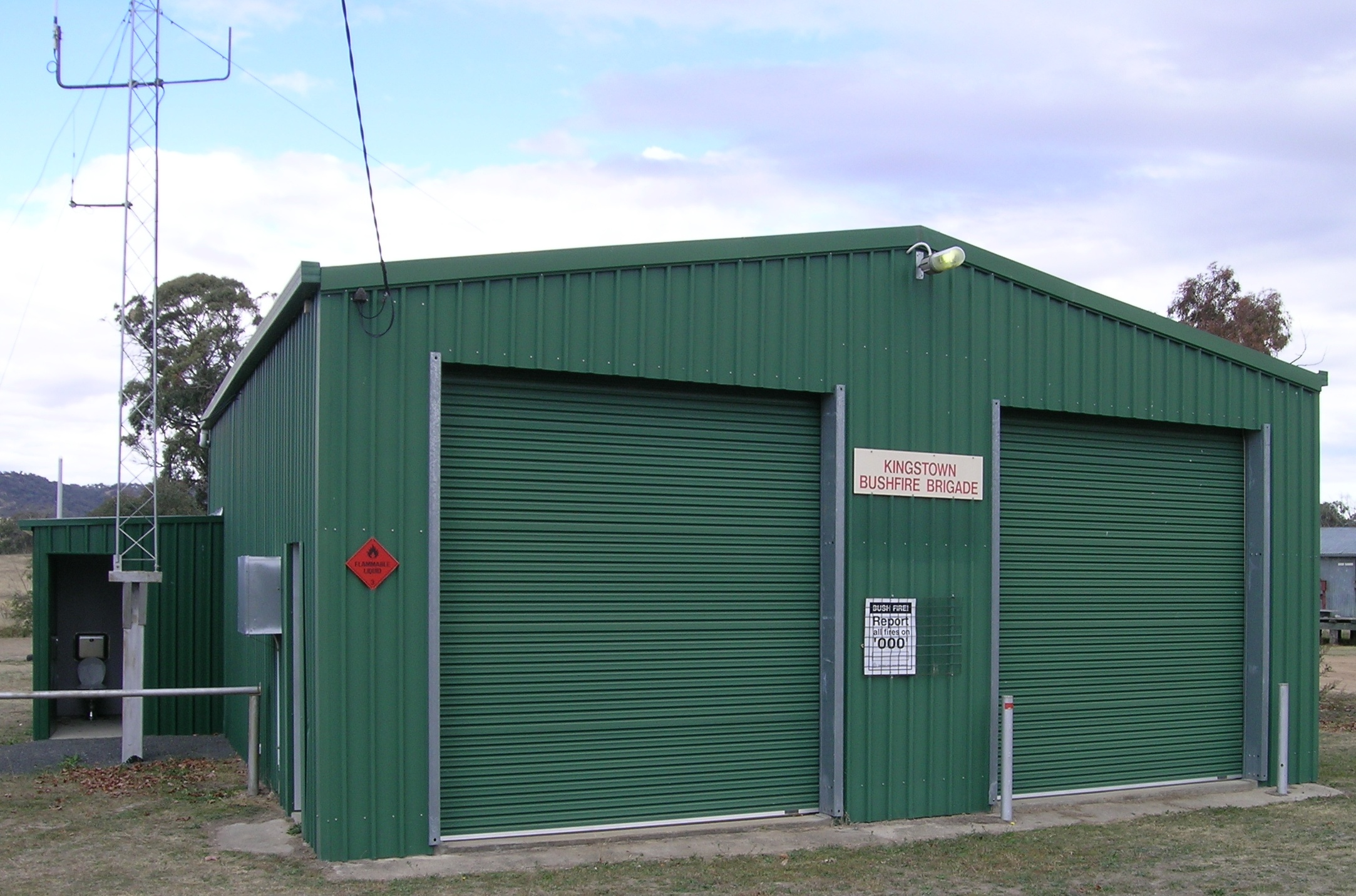
- RFS shed and the long awaited toilet, Kingstown

- Coordinates: 30°50′S 151°11′E
- Country: Australia
- State: New South Wales
- LGA: Uralla Shire
- Location: 514 km (319 mi) N of Sydney; 40 km (25 mi) NW of Uralla; 67 km (42 mi) W of Armidale; 50 km (31 mi) S of Bundarra

Government
  - State electorate: Northern Tablelands
  - Federal division: New England
- Elevation: 725 m (2,379 ft)

Population
  - Total: 137 (2006 census)
- Postcode: 2358
- County: Hardinge

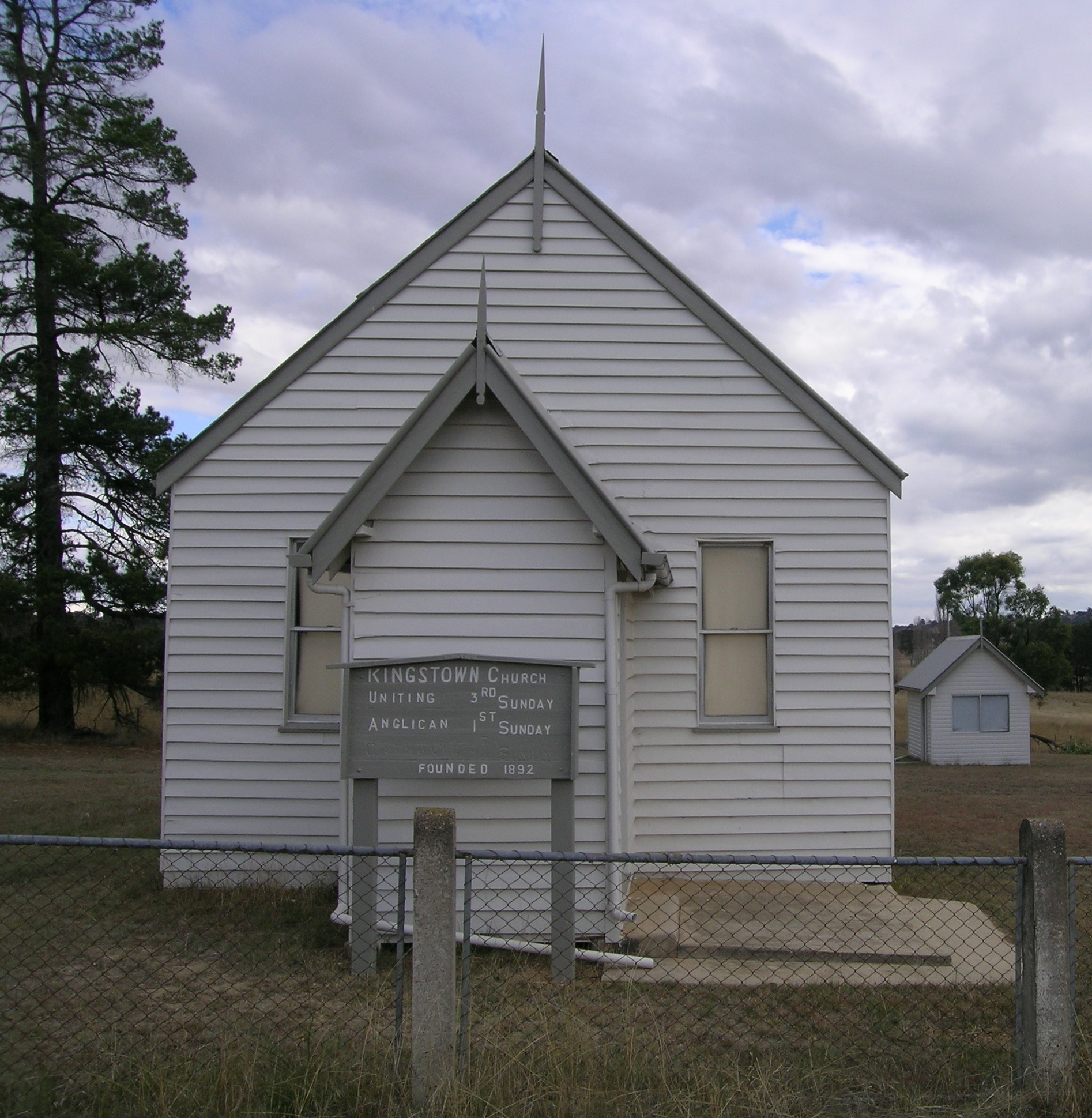
Church, Kingstown, NSW

Kingstown is a rural village, 40 kilometres (25 mi) north west of Uralla on the Northern Tablelands in the New England region of New South Wales, Australia. At the 2006 census, Kingstown had a population of 137 people. It has a public school, church, general store, Landcare Group and New South Wales Rural Fire Service. The main industries are sheep and beef cattle breeding with some timber production.

== Location ==
The village is at the end of the sealed Uralla to Kingstown Road. Originally the main north road went from Tamworth through Bendemeer to Kingstown and then to Bundarra. Warrabah National Park is about 15 km to the west, but there is very limited access from the Kingstown side. It lies next to the Bundarra-Barraba Important Bird Area which is important for the conservation of the endangered regent honeyeater.

== History ==
The Loopanda Aboriginal people occupied this area long before the arrival of the first European settlers.

After several years of petitioning the village was granted a post office which opened on 1 May 1875 (it closed in 1984)., to be known as Kingstown and not Stoney (sic) Batter as the area was previously known. Stoney Batter continues to be used for an area a few miles north of Kingstown.

The timber church which opened in 1893 is used regularly by Bundarra, Uralla and Armidale ministers of various denominations. Although owned by the Uniting Church, maintenance of the property is a community effort.

In 1896 Kingstown was granted a part time teacher that rode between Torryburn and Kingstown Half-Time Schools to teach. This ride was about 9 miles each way and had to be undertaken in all weather conditions. The Kingstown School was enlarged in 1899 to accommodate the then 20 students who were attending classes there. In 1906 the school was upgraded to a full time Provisional School and later the same year was granted the status of a Public School.

Kingstown was in the spotlight during 2007 when the Uralla Shire Council told residents that a public toilet was too expensive. After local residents collected 200 signatures from residents and tourists and presented them to council the toilet was erected.
