= The Uralla News =

The Uralla News, 29 April 1904

The Uralla News was an English language newspaper published in Uralla, New South Wales, Australia between 1904 and approximately 1915.

== History ==
This newspaper was first published on 29 April 1904 by Joseph Elliott. It was published weekly and ceased publication in approximately 1915.

== Digitisation ==
The paper has been digitised as part of the Australian Newspapers Digitisation Program of the National Library of Australia.
