= Rocky River, New South Wales =

Locality in New South Wales, Australia

Coordinates: 30°37′S 151°30′E

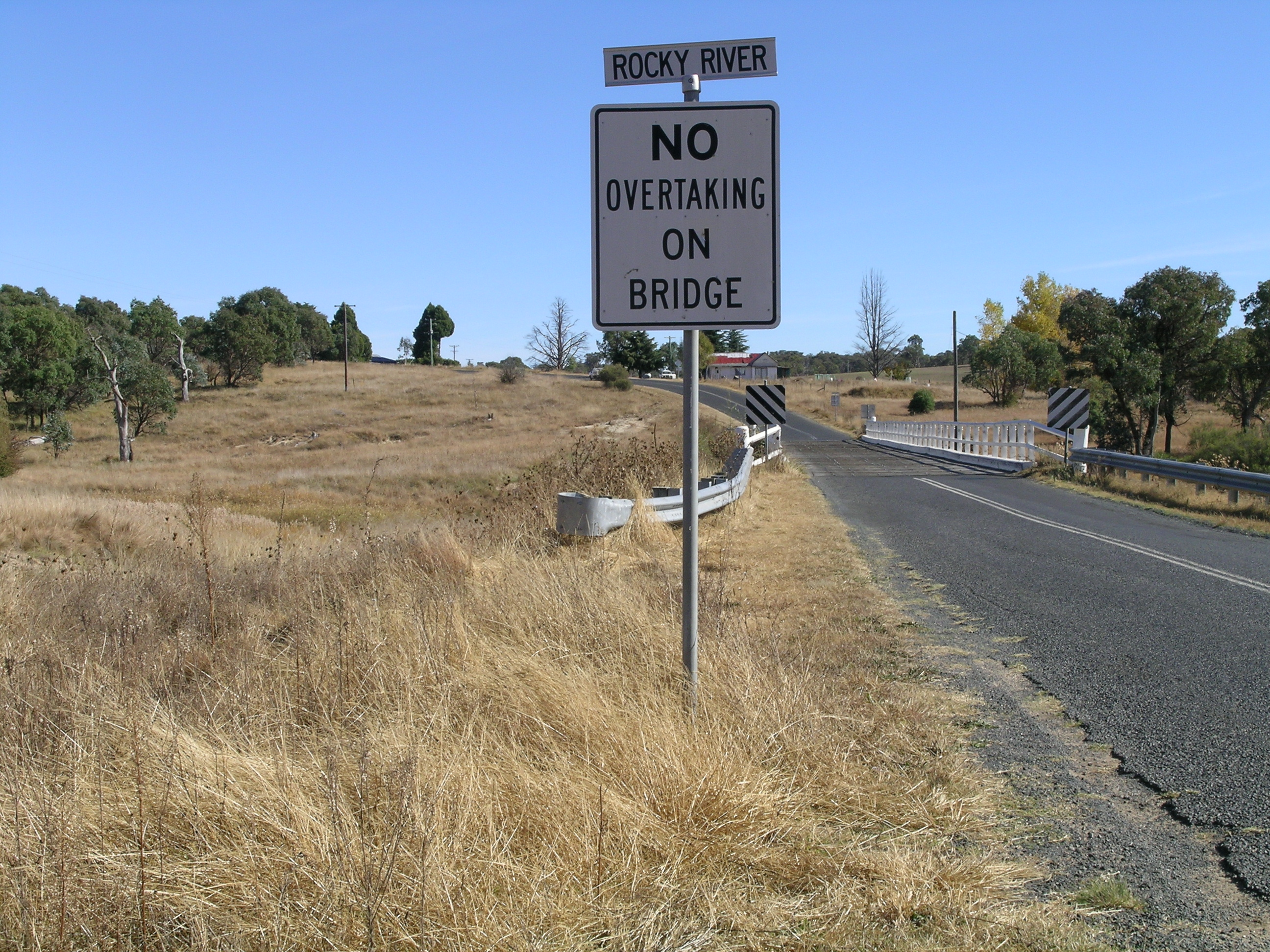
Thunderbolts Way, Rocky River, Uralla, NSW

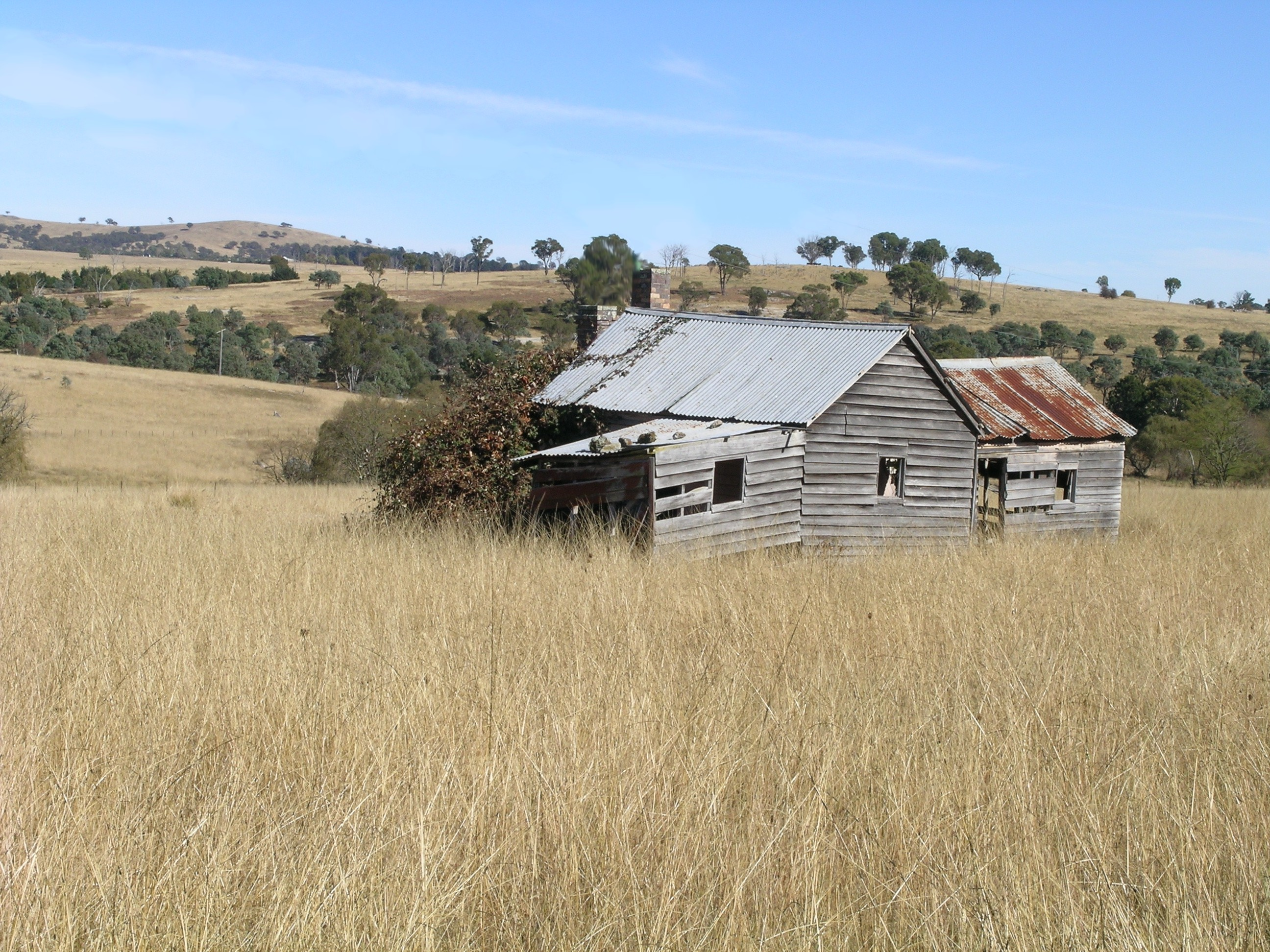
Abandoned house, Rocky River, Uralla, NSW

Rocky River is a locality in northern New South Wales, Australia, near Uralla on the Northern Tablelands plateau.

About three kilometres west of Uralla, was the gold mining area and associated village also called Rocky River. In 1851 W.F. Buchanan and J. Lucas reported to the Maitland office that gold had been found at Rocky River. This announcement was made official on 7 October 1851, by Commissioner Massie, and started a rush to the area. In 1852 the first licences to prospect were taken out. In October 1852, the Windeyer Brothers discovered the first payable gold on the field washing about five ounces of gold in less than a week. This caused further interest and by the end of 1852, the goldfield's population rose to around 150 persons. At this time it was all alluvial mining, confined to the rivers and creeks. Panning and cradling were the usual methods of extracting the gold from the wash dirt.

The census carried out between 3 and 5 June 1854 reported that there were 86 tents on the field and a population of 350, comprising 193 males, 58 females and 99 children. Until 1856 Rocky River gold field was small and unimportant to the remainder of the country. In February 1856 John Jones discovered a few specks of gold lying in cartwheel tracks on what is now known as Mt Jones. Jones's discovery then led to the sinking of deep-lead shafts in the vicinity and another rush into the area.

Around 1856 Rocky River was a thriving goldfield town with an estimated 4,000 to 5,000 miners and their families. Rocky River, at its peak supported 20 hotels, numerous boarding houses, stores, churches and schools. Among the miners were many Chinese, some of whom had made the long trek from Goulburn and Victorian goldfields. Many of the Chinese miners worked over the original alluvial field at Maitland Point, south of Thunderbolts Way, near Rocky River bridge. Some of these miners later bought land around the Northern Tablelands and settled there as farmers. After the rush, permanent allotments were taken up and in 1861.

Today only the Public School on Thunderbolts Way and a few houses remain.

In the 2006 Census (held on 8 August 2006), there were 479 persons usually resident in the Rocky River area.

== See also ==
- Rocky River (New South Wales) - the river
