= New England Brass and Iron Lace Foundry =

Former iron foundry in New South Wales

- Location within New South Wales Location within Australia
- 30°38′54″S 151°30′07″E
- Location: 6 East Street, Uralla, Uralla Shire, New South Wales, Australia

History
- Built: 1900–1900

New South Wales Heritage Register
- Official name: New England Brass and Iron Lace Foundry; Phoenix Foundry and contents; Industrial Archaeological Site
- Type: State heritage (built)
- Designated: 17 August 2001
- Reference no.: 1455
- Type: Foundry Iron/Brass
- Category: Manufacturing and Processing

The New England Brass and Iron Lace Foundry is a heritage-listed former foundry and now tourist attraction and foundry at 6 East Street, Uralla, Uralla Shire, New South Wales, Australia. It was built in 1900. It is also known as Phoenix Foundry. It was added to the New South Wales State Heritage Register on 17 August 2001.

== History ==
The New England Brass and Iron Lace Foundry is a well established foundry and museum. It is claimed to be Australia's oldest operating foundry, originally established in 1872. The business and its equipment moved operations to its present site in 1900. It is still operated for its original purpose.

The first iron foundry was established in Uralla by HS Goddard in 1875. It operated until 1900. At the end of 1901 the foundry was re-established on the present site by C. A. Young, utilising much of the equipment and many of the patterns at Goddard's works. During the Young era which effectively terminated with his son Les Young's sale of the foundry in the mid 1970s, new plant was installed, although the essential foundry practices of the 19th century were continued. Even today, some casting of metal takes place at the Uralla foundry, and the combination of simple technology, vintage plant and machinery and vernacular buildings creates a place whose evocative character is matched in very few other surviving small industrial works.

== Description ==
A timber industrial building. The site is listed as a heritage item in the Uralla LEP. This listing includes the movable heritage within the building, including a mass of cedar wooden patterns for iron lace casting, many of which date back to 1872.

=== Condition ===
As at 13 November 2000, good.

== Heritage listing ==
As at 13 November 2000, Australia's oldest operating foundry in original condition, including associated industrial objects and movable contents.

By virtue of its history as an important long-standing industrial undertaking in New England, and by virtue of its ability to demonstrate industrial technologies and techniques now long gone, CA Young's Phoenix Foundry at Uralla is clearly a place of considerable significance to the State of New South Wales.

The New England Brass and Iron Lace Foundry was listed on the New South Wales State Heritage Register on 17 August 2001 having satisfied the following criteria.

The place is important in demonstrating the course, or pattern, of cultural or natural history in New South Wales.

Australia's oldest operating foundry in original condition, including associated industrial objects and movable contents.

The place is important in demonstrating aesthetic characteristics and/or a high degree of creative or technical achievement in New South Wales.

Thought to be Australia's oldest and most complete operating foundry.

The place has potential to yield information that will contribute to an understanding of the cultural or natural history of New South Wales.

Shows a traditional industrial process in operation. By virtue of its ability to demonstrate industrial technologies and techniques now long gone, CA Young's Phoenix Foundry at Uralla is clearly a place of considerable significance to the State of New South Wales.

The place possesses uncommon, rare or endangered aspects of the cultural or natural history of New South Wales.

Rare.
