= Bulagaranda (Mount Yarrowyck) Aboriginal Area =

Protected area in New South Wales, Australia

- Location within New South Wales
- Location: New South Wales
- Nearest city: Yarrowyck
- Coordinates: 30°26′54″S 151°23′04″E
- Area: 5.85 km^{2} (2.26 sq mi)
- Established: February 1983
- Governing body: Anaiwan Local Aboriginal Land Council; Armidale Local Aboriginal Land Council; NSW National Parks & Wildlife Service
- Website: https://www.nationalparks.nsw.gov.au/visit-a-park/parks/bulagaranda-mount-yarrowyck-aboriginal-area

The Bulagaranda (Mount Yarrowyck) Aboriginal Area is located on the Northern Tablelands in the New England region of New South Wales, in eastern Australia. The 585-hectare (1,450-acre) reserve is situated near Yarrowyck and 30 kilometres (19 mi) west of Armidale.

The reserve previously existed as the Mount Yarrowyck Nature Reserve from 1983 until 2022, when it was handed back to Traditional Owners. The Anaiwan Local Aboriginal Land Council and Armidale Local Aboriginal Land Council now comanage the site in partnership with the NSW National Parks & Wildlife Service.

== Features ==
Located near the junction of the Armidale Road and Thunderbolts Way, the reserve protects an Aboriginal cave painting site and much of the natural environment of Mount Yarrowyck. The reserve's Aboriginal cultural walk, a 3-kilometre (1.9 mi) return track, runs along the granite slopes of the mountain to the cave painting site.

The track passes through one of the few remnants of natural bushland on the western slopes of the New England Tablelands. The walking track is clear and easy to follow and, apart from one short section, is level and undemanding.

== See also ==
- Protected areas of New South Wales
