= Kentucky, New South Wales =

Kentucky
- Town
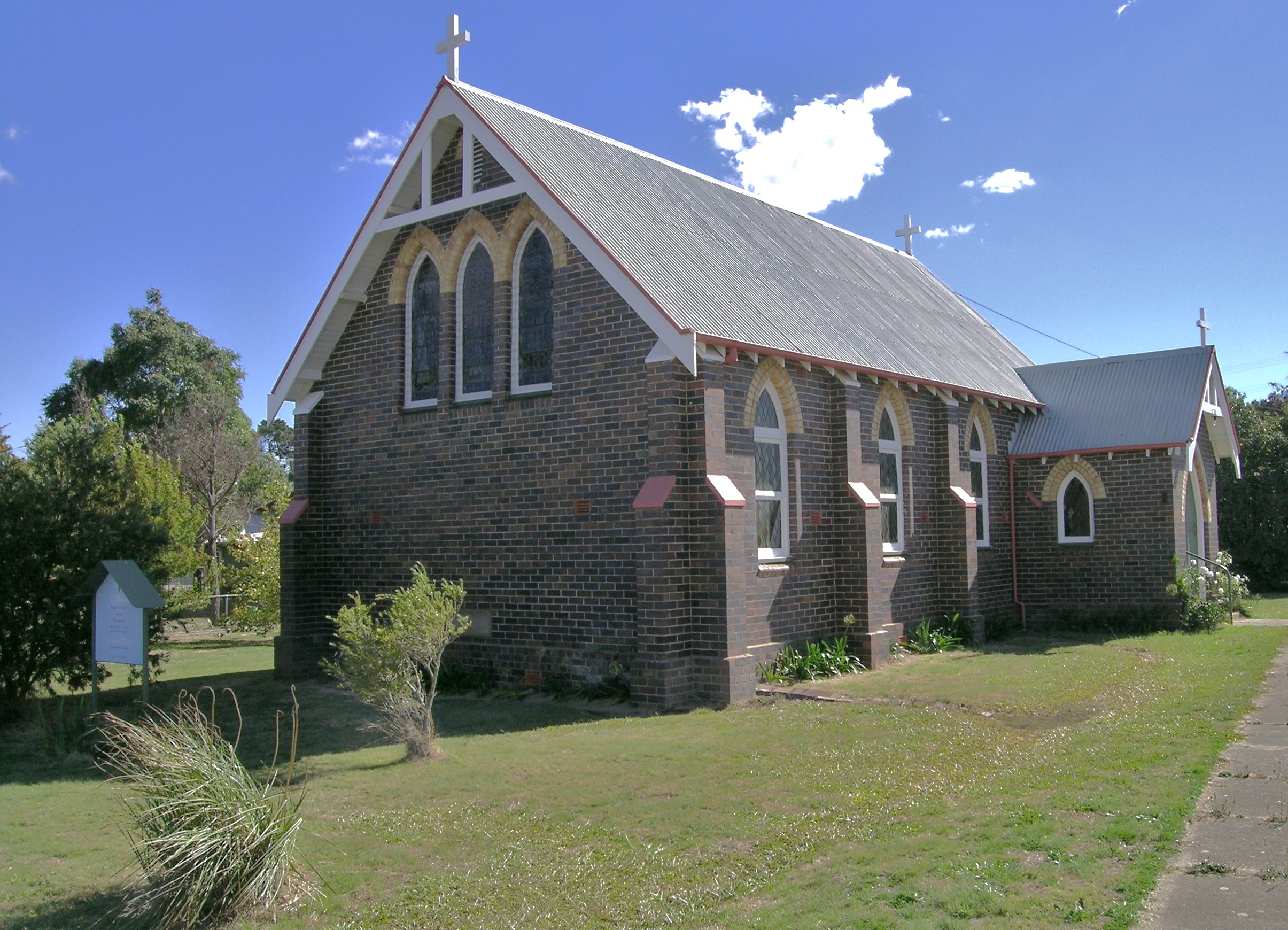
- St Mark's Church, Kentucky

- Coordinates: 30°46′S 151°27′E
- Country: Australia
- State: New South Wales
- LGA: Uralla Shire
- Location: 476 km (296 mi) N of Sydney; 39 km (24 mi) S of Armidale; 16 km (9.9 mi) S of Uralla

Government
  - State electorate: Northern Tablelands
  - Federal division: New England
- Elevation: 1,066 m (3,497 ft)

Population
  - Total: 158 (2016 census)
- Postcode: 2354
- County: Sandon

Kentucky is a village in the New England region of New South Wales, Australia. It is about 17 kilometres (11 mi) south of Uralla and 35 kilometres (22 mi) north-west of Walcha and about 7 kilometres (4 mi) off the New England Highway. Kentucky is located 540 kilometres (336 mi) by rail from Sydney in Sandon County on the Northern Tablelands. It is at an altitude of 1066m and is within Uralla Shire. At the 2016 census, Kentucky had a population of 158.

== History ==
On 25 May 1870 Alexander Binning Walker, a rural lock-up keeper, chased, confronted and killed the infamous bushranger Fred Ward, alias Captain Thunderbolt, at Kentucky Creek, Uralla.

The Kentucky railway station, on the Main North Line, was opened on 2 August 1882. It was closed many years ago, though daily Sydney/Armidale trains still pass through the village.

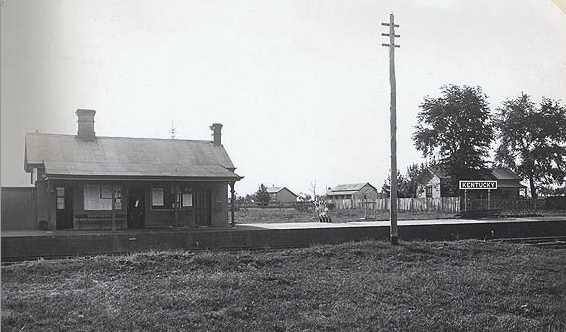
Kentucky railway station, with the school behind, c. 1920

Preceding station	Former services	Following station
Uralla towards Wallangarra	Main Northern Line	Wollun towards Sydney

The area was a former soldier settlement region with many orchards and other agricultural properties. The development of the Kentucky Returned Soldiers Settlement along the railway between Kentucky and Wollun commenced in July 1918. This settlement covered 7,319 acres (29.62 km^{2}), mostly of a light sandy granite type soil. The area was divided into eighty holdings of 40 to 250 acres (1.0 km^{2}) each depending on the location of the farm. The total orchard area which was planted with apples, pears, prunes, plums and cherries was 1,200 acres (4.9 km^{2}).

The Kentucky Memorial Hall, in 2008, installed a memorial plaque at the Noalimba Avenue of Honour dedicated to the original soldier settlers and those servicemen and women from the district who enlisted in subsequent conflicts.

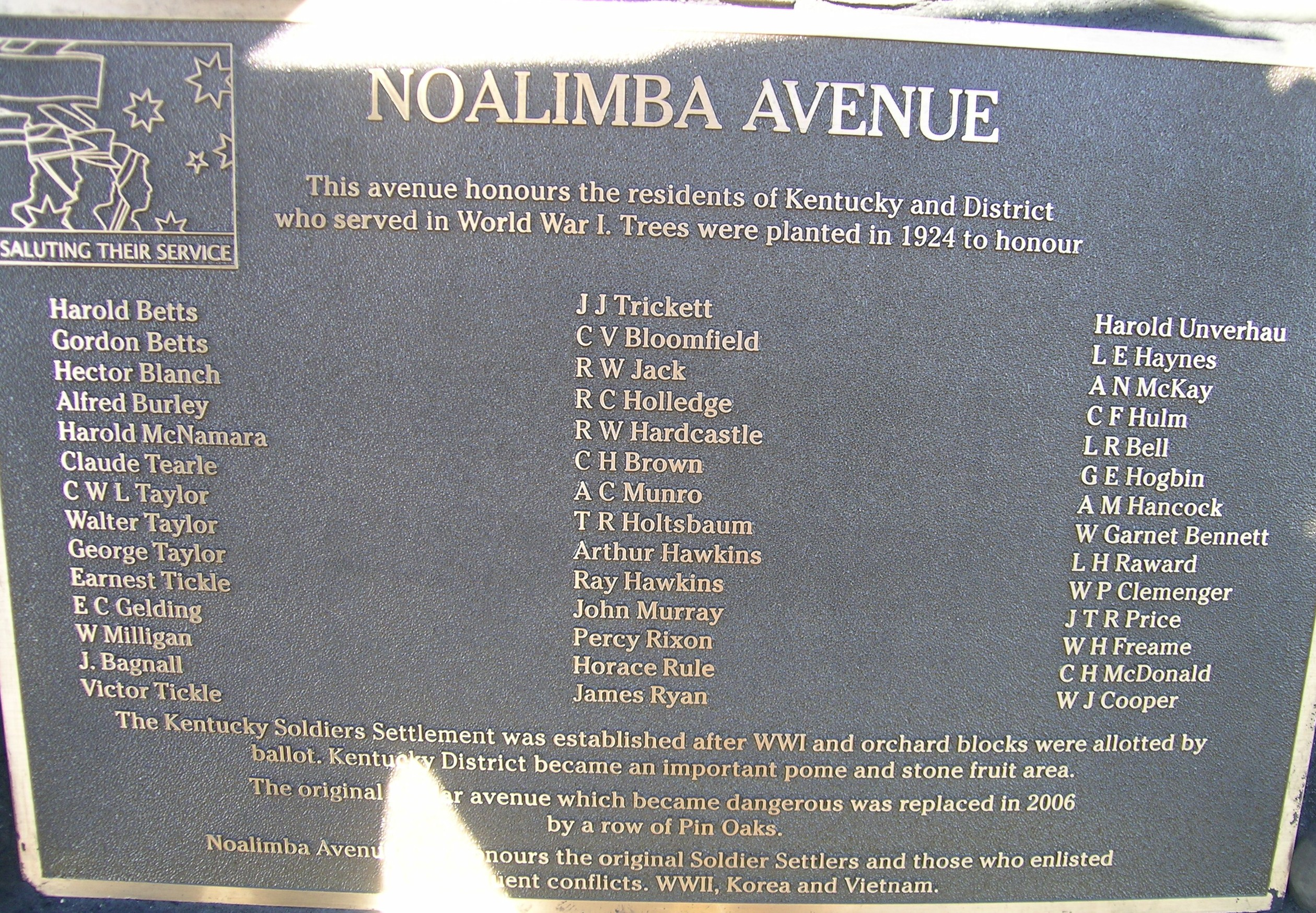
Noalimba Avenue Memorial

About 4 km south of Kentucky is Kentucky South which was a rail siding that opened on 18 October 1926 and closed on 20 February 1975. Some of the old rail sheds remain there along with several houses.

== Kentucky today ==
The district now has several well-known Merino sheep studs and produces some top super fine wool, as well as quality beef cattle. Apples, cherries, pears and other stone fruit are available from the orchards during the season. The Kentucky Tree Nursery produces many low cost trees and shrubs for farm planting. A boutique distillery and brewery (Dobson's), a fine-dining restaurant (Pinot) and a sophisticated nightclub (The Speakeasy) together comprise Eastview Estate, developed since 2009 immediately to the north-east of the village. Kentucky also has two churches, a community hall, general store and a progressive public school. Some of the country gardens are opened to the public through the open gardens scheme and community fund raising schemes. The current population is about 60 persons.
