= Arding, New South Wales =

Locality in New South Wales, Australia

Arding is a small, rural locality in New South Wales. It is located approximately 366 kilometres from Sydney and covers an area of about 54.8 square kilometres.

The settlement is located within the local government area of Uralla.

== Demographics ==
As of the 2021 Census, the town has a population of 182 people. 91 persons were male, making 49.7% and 92 were female, making up the other 50.3%. 85 people (46.7%) stated that they had Australian ancestry, 82 (45.1%) stated they had English heritage, 24 (13.2%) came from an Irish background, 22 (12.1%) had Scottish ancestry and 11 (6%) had German ancestry. 153 people (84.1%) stated that they were born in Australia, 4 (2.2%) said they were born in the Netherlands and 3 (1.6%) were born in Malaysia.

51.5% of the population are Christians, with Anglicans and Catholics constituting 17% each, Uniting Church adherents constituting 10.4% and Presbyterian and Reformed Churches accounting for 7.1%. People professing no religion constituted 28% of the population.
