= McCrossan =

McCrossan is a surname. It is similar to McCrossin.

== List of people with the surname ==
- Anthony McCrossan, British sports commentator
- Daniel McCrossan (born 1988), Northern Irish politician
- Mary McCrossan (1865–1934), British artist
- Paul McCrossan (born 1942), Canadian actuary and politician
