= Invergowrie, New South Wales =

Invergowrie
- Town
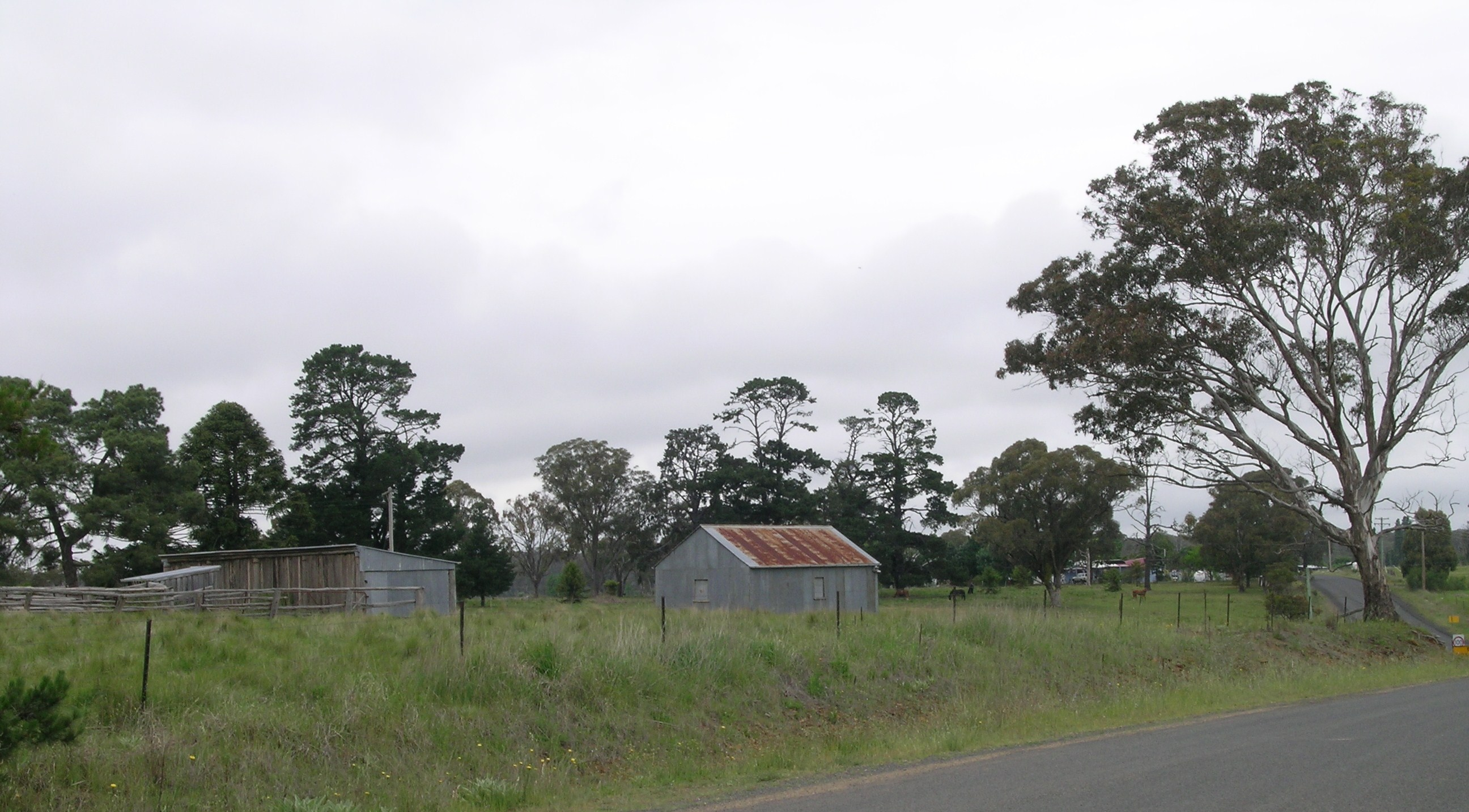
- Invergowrie

- Coordinates: 30°18′S 151°19′E
- Country: Australia
- State: New South Wales
- LGA: Uralla Shire
- Location: 454 km (282 mi) N of Sydney; 483 km (300 mi) S of Brisbane; 16 km (9.9 mi) W of Armidale; 19 km (12 mi) N of Uralla, New South Wales

Government
  - State electorate: Northern Tablelands
  - Federal division: New England
- Elevation: 1,040 m (3,410 ft)

Population
  - Total: 775 (2016 census)
- Postcode: 2350
- County: Sandon

Invergowrie is a locality in the Uralla Shire local government area on the Northern Tablelands of New South Wales, Australia. It is located about 16 km west of Armidale, about halfway between Sydney and Brisbane and approximately 200 km inland from Coffs Harbour on the Pacific coast. Invergowrie is a popular rural neighbourhood for staff of the University of New England. At the 2016 census, Invergowrie had a population of 775 people. It has a general store, a fuel station and a New South Wales Rural Fire Service station.

Invergowrie was named after the village Invergowrie in Scotland.
