= Warrabah National Park =

National park in Australia

- IUCN category II (national park)
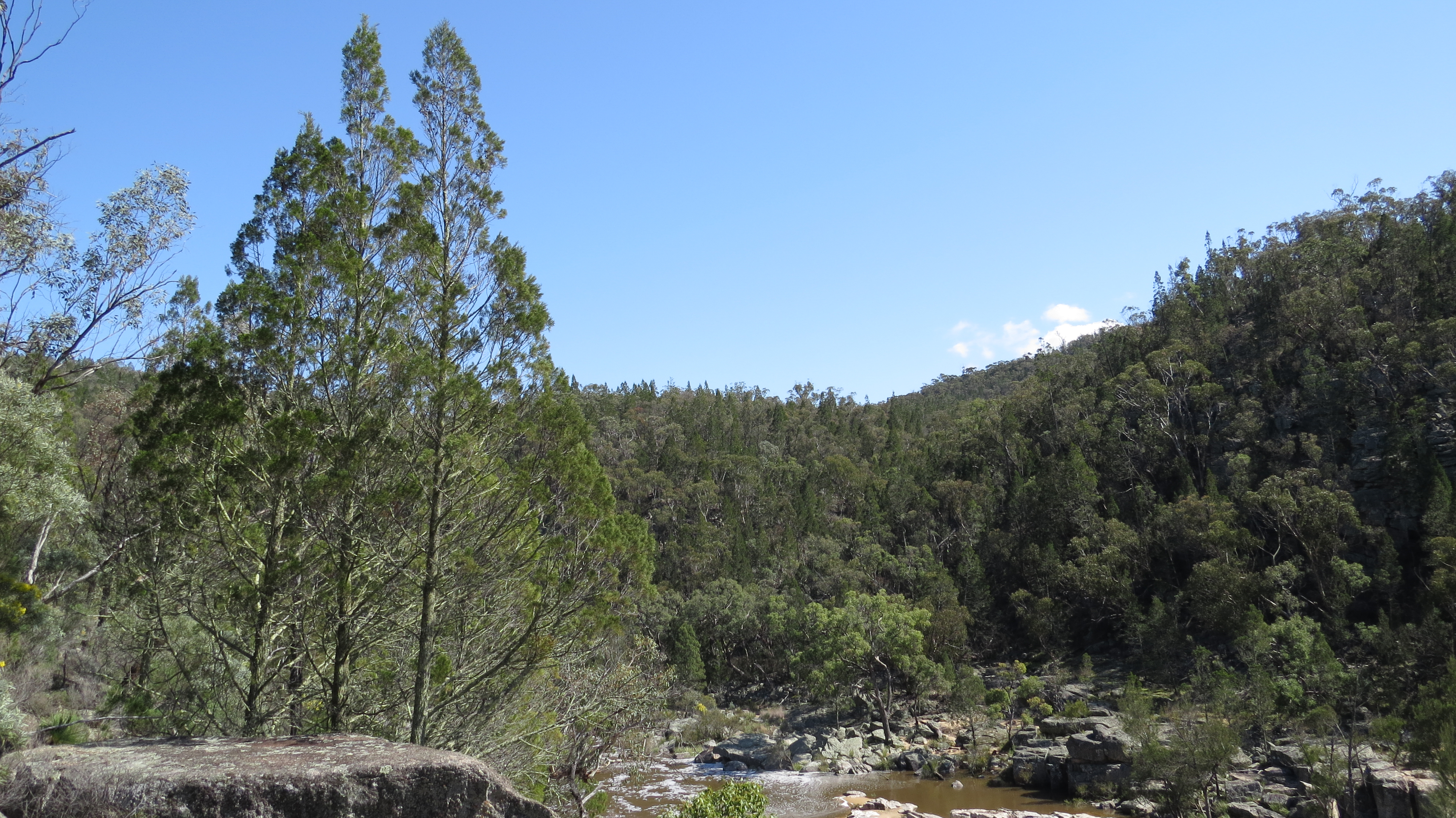
- Warrabah National Park, September 2016

- Location within New South Wales
- Location: New South Wales
- Nearest city: Kingstown
- Coordinates: 30°32′42″S 150°56′46″E
- Area: 34.71 km^{2} (13.40 sq mi)
- Established: 1984
- Governing body: NSW National Parks & Wildlife Service
- Website: Official website

Warrabah is a national park in New South Wales, Australia, 371 km (231 mi) north of Sydney. It is situated west of Kingstown and east of Split Rock Dam.

The major feature of the park is the Namoi River which carves a 15 km (9.3 mi) gorge that drops 245 m (804 ft). Activities in the park include canoeing, li-loing, rock climbing and bush walking. The average elevation of the terrain is 759 metres.

Over 120 bird species have been spotted here. Among others there are robins, rosellas and cockatoos to wedge-tailed eagles and wrens.

== See also ==
- Protected areas of New South Wales
