= McCrossins Mill =

- Location within New South Wales Location within Australia
- 30°38′35″S 151°30′00″E
- Location: Salisbury Street, Uralla, Uralla Shire, New South Wales, Australia

Site notes
- Architect: John McCrossin
- Owner: Uralla Historical Society Inc

New South Wales Heritage Register
- Official name: McCrossins Mill
- Type: State heritage (built)
- Designated: 2 April 1999
- Reference no.: 161
- Type: Mill (Grain) – Wheat
- Category: Manufacturing and Processing
- Builders: Unknown

The McCrossins Mill is a heritage-listed former mill and store and now museum at Salisbury Street, Uralla, Uralla Shire, New South Wales, Australia. It was designed by John McCrossin and built by Unknown. The property is owned by Uralla Historical Society Inc. It was added to the New South Wales State Heritage Register on 2 April 1999.

== History ==
The Mill was constructed between the late 1860s and early 1870s by John McCrossin. Equipped with a 16 horsepower engine, the mill operated three mill stones with a production capacity of around 1000 bushels a week.

McCrossin built the mill in the expectation that the New England region would become a major exporter of flour to other parts of the Colony. Soon after the completion of the mill, however, flour prices began to fall. McCrossin could not compete with the two other mills already established in Uralla and the further four in Armidale, one in Inverell and one in Walcha. Drought and the importation of higher quality South Australian flour killed the New England wheat growing and, therefore, the milling business. South Australian flour was of a higher quality as the wheat ripened more evenly and thoroughly, allowing for the use of mechanical harvesters. Additionally, South Australian mills used steel rollers to mill the grain, producing a finer flour than the gritty product created by the mill stones employed by the New England millers. The Chaff Shed was probably constructed in response to falling trade. Unlike the Mill, it was constructed as cheaply as possible to diversify the services offered by the Mill.

The mill apparently closed in the 1890s. Early in the 19th century the buildings were bought by a skin buyer. The Mill then passed into the hands of the Cooper family, who operated a hardware and undertaking business in it. During this period part of the mill was used by Mr Crossman, who was a tank maker. Also around this time the Mill's engine was removed to the Rocky River gold fields.

About 1935 the McRae family purchased the Mill as a store for their grocery and produce business. Ken McRae buried the boiler outside the eastern wall of the mill in the early 1960s. Both the McRaes and Coopers used the well to dispose of rubbish so that it had been filled by 1960.

The Uralla Historical Society bought the Mill in 1979 and began restorations, funded by the Heritage Council of NSW. Today the Mill is operated as a museum by the Society.

Constructed next to John McCrossin's Flour Mill in 1881 as a chaff cutting shed, with power delivered by a wooden driveshaft through an aperture in the "western" wall of the mill.

- 1940–1979 – used as storage by the McCrae's Hardware Shop, and known as the "Wireshed".
- 1979 – purchased by Uralla Historical Society.
- 1982–84 – squared and stabilised by the society.

== Description ==
Mill Building

A three storey brick structure facing onto Salisbury Street in a south-south-westerly direction. A verandah stretches the 18-metre (59 ft) length of the building, sheltering a central double door. Two windows are evenly spaced on either side of the door, on the upper five windows are symmetrically aligned. The ground floor on the north, west and south walls is constructed of roughly dressed local white granite blocks, infilled with smaller pieces. The front facade is coursed in evener blocks. The upper storeys are of red brick. The outer walls and parts of the inner walls have been laid in English bond (a course of headers alternating with a course of stretchers). On the inside back wall of the first and second floors has been laid in what could be described as a crude form of Colonial bond. Colonial bond usually consists of three courses of stretchers followed by one course of headers. In this example up to five courses of stretchers have been laid between the intervening courses of headers. Colonial bond did not become popular in Sydney until the early 1880s (mill construction began in late 1860s).

At the rear of the building there is a row of windows on the first floor. On the ground floor a series of windows and doors have been made into the original structure.

In the south east corner of the eastern wall a door opens into the original engine room, which runs the 12-metre (39 ft) width of the building. A door level with the first opens into the larger milling area. Halfway along the wall dividing the engine and milling rooms is a wall box, originally to transfer power between the two.

Two flights of steep stairs, located towards Salisbury Street in the milling room, lead to the second and third floors. These floors are supported by a series of four brick piers dividing the front two thirds of the milling area from the rear. These piers extend up through the second and third floors to support the roof. The hipped roof was originally wooden shingles, which has subsequently been replaced with corrugated iron.

Between the ground and first floors is a trap door and a series of small chutes to allow for the movement of grain and flour between the floors.

Chaff Shed

The Chaff Shed occupies approximately 196 square metres (2,110 sq ft), between McCrossin's Mill 1870 and McCrossin's Stables/Store c. 1878. The first floor and steeply pitched roof with its tapered rafters and shingle battens are supported by twenty one huge, round poles, approximately 300 millimetres (12 in) in diameter. Roof and walls are now corrugated iron. There is a loading bay on the first floor.

=== Condition ===
The mill's physical condition is fair; and the archaeological potential is low. Its position and basic condition (but not cosmetic condition), make it significant.

=== Modifications and dates ===
The following modifications have been made:

- c. 1910 – Windows were installed in the front wall.
- 1975 – Dovecot removed
- 1982–84 – Flooring on ground floor demolished; and rotted poles replaced or scarfed.

== Heritage listing ==
McCrossins Mill is of State significance as representing the endeavours of early settlers to determine the agricultural pursuits best suited to various part of New South Wales. While wheat and flour production ultimately failed in the area, McCrossins Mill is a reminder of the trial and error approach to agriculture. McCrossins Mill is also representative of the speculation in industry driven by the gold rush, being built to supply that market.

McCrossins Mill was listed on the New South Wales State Heritage Register on 2 April 1999 having satisfied the following criteria.

The place has a strong or special association with a person, or group of persons, of importance of cultural or natural history of New South Wales's history.

The McCrossin family were pioneers of commerce in Uralla: Flour milling, retailers, hoteliers etc.

The place is important in demonstrating aesthetic characteristics and/or a high degree of creative or technical achievement in New South Wales.

The existence of such a formidable rural building in the village precinct is most unusual.

The place has strong or special association with a particular community or cultural group in New South Wales for social, cultural or spiritual reasons.

The chaff shed now has a very special association with the Uralla Historical Society.

The place possesses uncommon, rare or endangered aspects of the cultural or natural history of New South Wales.

The existence of such a formidable rural building in the village precinct is most unusual.
