= Uralla Shire =

- Local government area
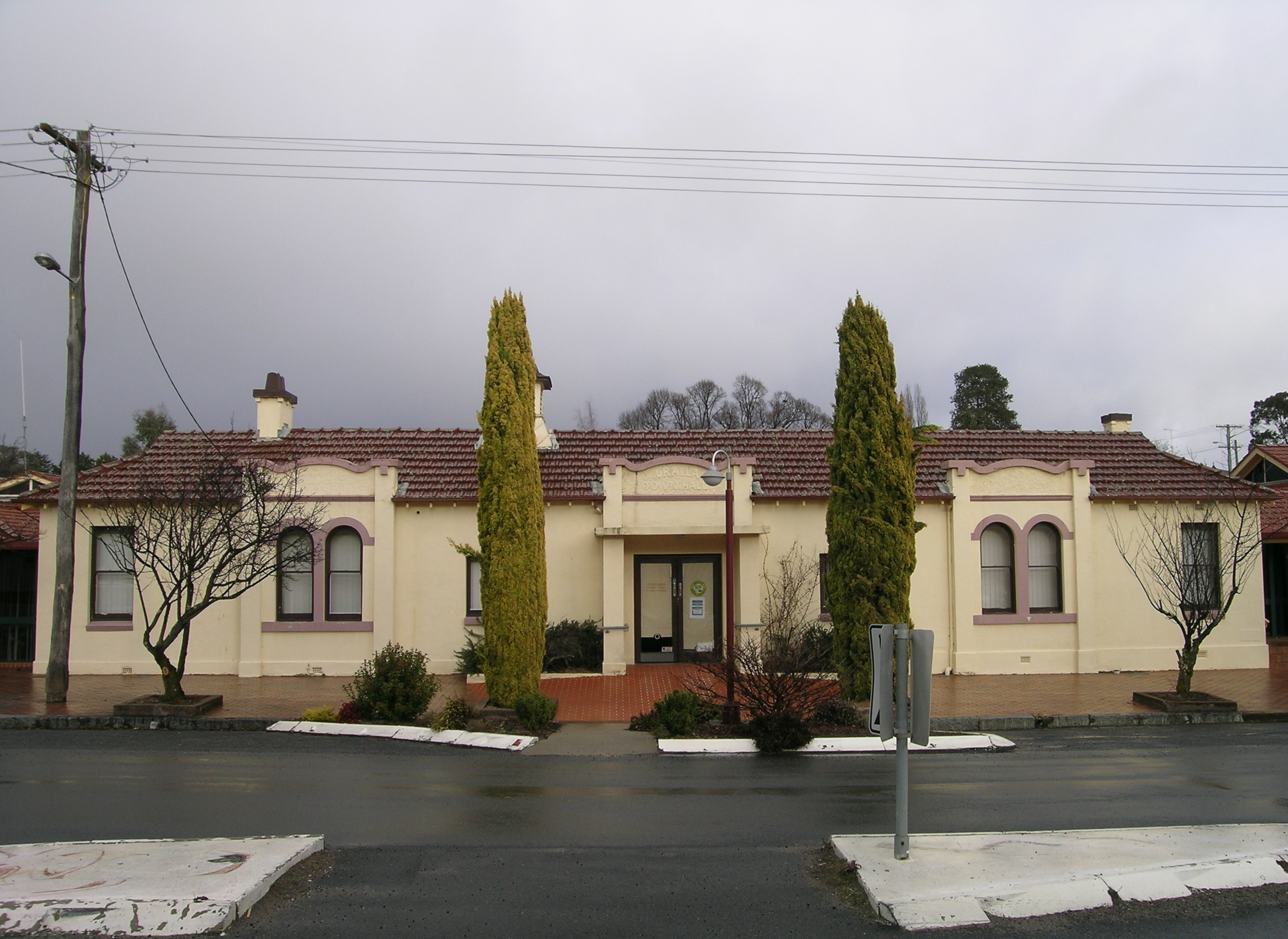
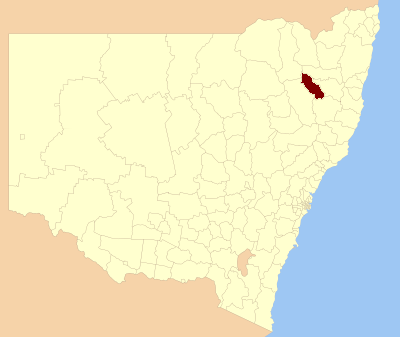
- Council chambers, 2010 Location in New South Wales
- Interactive map of Uralla Shire
- Coordinates: 30°39′S 151°30′E
- Country: Australia
- State: New South Wales
- Region: New England
- Established: 1 January 1948
- Council seat: Uralla

Government
  - Mayor: Robert Bell (Independent)
  - State electorate: Northern Tablelands
  - Federal division: New England

Area
  - Total: 3,230 km^{2} (1,250 sq mi)

Population
  - Totals: 6,048 (2016 census); 6,062 (2018 est.)
  - Density: 1.8724/km^{2} (4.850/sq mi)
- Website: Uralla Shire
LGAs around Uralla Shire
Gwydir	Inverell	Armidale
Tamworth	Uralla Shire	Armidale
Tamworth	Walcha	Walcha

Uralla Shire is a local government area located in the New England region of New South Wales, Australia. The New England Highway passes through the Shire.

The Shire was established on 1 January 1948 as a result of the amalgamation of the Municipality of Uralla with the surrounding Gostwyck Shire. The mayor of Uralla Shire Council is Robert Bell.

== Towns and villages ==
The towns and villages of Uralla Shire include Uralla, Arding, Bundarra, Yarrowyck, Kingstown, Kentucky, Invergowrie and Wollun.

== Heritage listings ==
The Uralla Shire has a number of heritage-listed sites, including:

- Bundarra, Oliver Street: Bundarra Police Station and Courthouse
- Kentucky District: Captain Thunderbolt's Death Site
- Uralla, 6 East Street: New England Brass and Iron Lace Foundry
- Uralla, Main Northern railway: Uralla railway station
- Uralla, Salisbury Street: McCrossins Mill
- Uralla, Uralla Square: Captain Thunderbolt's Grave
- Uralla, New England Highway: Blanch's Royal Oak Inn
- Uralla, New England Highway: Captain Thunderbolt's Rock

== Demographics ==
According to the Australian Bureau of Statistics there:

- were 6,126 people as at 30 June 2006, the 122nd largest Local Government Area in New South Wales. It was equal to less than 0.1% of the New South Wales population of 6,827,694
- was an increase of 56 people over the year to 30 June 2006, the 101st largest population growth in a Local Government Area in New South Wales. It was equal to 0.1% of the 58,753 increase in the population of New South Wales
- was, in percentage terms, an increase of 0.9% in the number of people over the year to 30 June 2006, the 55th fastest growth in population of a Local Government Area in New South Wales. In New South Wales the population grew by 0.9%
- was an increase in population over the 10 years to 30 June 2006 of 78 people or 1.3% (0.1% in annual average terms), the 94th highest rate of a Local Government Area in New South Wales. In New South Wales the population grew by 622,966 or 10% (1.0% in annual average terms) over the same period.

=== Incomes ===
According to the Australian Bureau Statistics during 2003–04, there:

- were 1,865 wage and salary earners (ranked 118th in New South Wales and 381st in Australia, less than 0.1% of both New South Wales's 2,558,415 Australia's 7,831,856)
- was a total income of around $58 million (ranked 118th in New South Wales and 384th in Australia, less than 0.1% of both New South Wales's $107 billion and Australia's $304 billion)
- was an estimated average income per wage and salary earner of $31,071 (ranked 128th in New South Wales and 435th in Australia, 75% of New South Wales's $41,407 and 80% of Australia's $38,820)
- was an estimated median income per wage and salary earner of $28,396 (ranked 140th in New South Wales and 461st in Australia, 80% of New South Wales's $35,479 and 83% of Australia's $34,149).

== Council ==
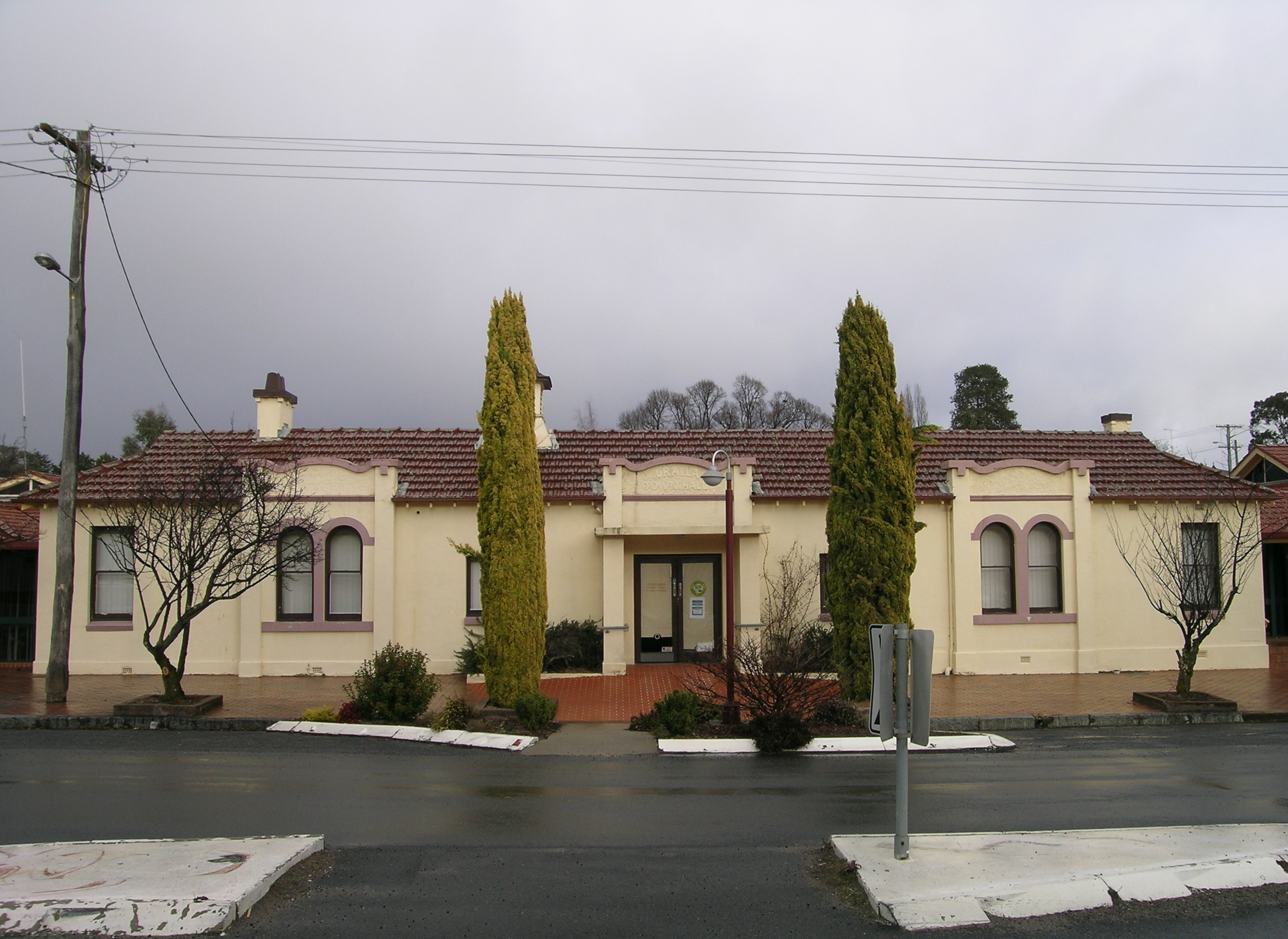
Uralla Shire Council chambers

=== Current composition and election method ===
Uralla Shire Council is composed of nine councillors elected proportionally as three separate wards, each electing three councillors. All councillors are elected for a fixed four-year term of office. The mayor is elected by the councillors at the first meeting of the council.

At the 2012 local government elections, a referendum was held to directly elect the mayor and reduce the number of wards from three to two, each electing four councillors. The referendum was passed, with 55.96% voting in favour of the resolution.

== Election results ==
=== 2024 ===
2024 New South Wales local elections: Uralla
Party	Votes	%	Swing	Seats	Change
Independents	0	0.0	−100.0	8	Steady
Total	0	0.0		8	
Registered voters / turnout	4,699	0.0			

== Proposed amalgamation ==
A 2015 review of local government boundaries recommended that the Armidale Dumaresq Shire and the Guyra Shire councils merge. An alternative proposal, submitted by the Armidale Dumaresq Council on 1 March 2016, was for an amalgamation of the Armidale Dumaresq, Guyra, Uralla and Walcha councils. The outcome of the independent review is expected by mid–2016.
