= Sandon County =

Sandon New South Wales
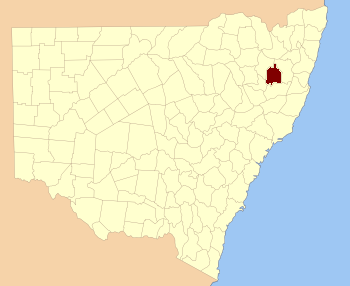
- Location in New South Wales
Lands administrative divisions around Sandon:
Hardinge	Hardinge	Clarke
Hardinge	Sandon	Clarke
Inglis	Vernon	Vernon

Sandon County is one of the 141 cadastral divisions of New South Wales. It is centred on Armidale, and also includes Uralla.

Sandon County was named in honour of Dudley Ryder, First Earl of Harrowby and Viscount Sandon (1762–1847).

== Parishes within this county ==
A full list of parishes found within this county; their current LGA and mapping coordinates to the approximate centre of each location is as follows:

Parish	LGA	Coordinates
Albert	Armidale Regional Council	30°23′54″S 151°30′04″E
Arding	Uralla Shire Council	30°33′54″S 151°30′04″E
Armidale	Armidale Regional Council	30°30′54″S 151°41′04″E
Blacknote	Uralla Shire Council	30°49′54″S 151°33′04″E
Boorolong	Armidale Regional Council	30°19′54″S 151°34′04″E
Butler	Uralla Shire Council	30°29′54″S 151°36′04″E
Clevedon	Armidale Regional Council	30°21′54″S 151°53′04″E
Cooney	Armidale Regional Council	30°38′54″S 151°53′04″E
Dangarsleigh	Armidale Regional Council	30°35′54″S 151°35′04″E
Davidson	Armidale Regional Council	30°24′24″S 151°52′04″E
Devon	Uralla Shire Council	30°38′54″S 151°26′04″E
Donald	Armidale Regional Council	30°26′54″S 151°44′04″E
Dumaresq	Armidale Regional Council	30°24′54″S 151°34′04″E
Duval	Armidale Regional Council	30°25′54″S 151°38′04″E
Eastlake	Uralla Shire Council	30°48′54″S 151°37′04″E
Elton	Uralla Shire Council	30°29′54″S 151°31′04″E
Enmore	Armidale Regional Council	30°42′54″S 151°48′04″E
Exmouth	Armidale Regional Council	30°19′54″S 151°38′04″E
Falconer	Armidale Regional Council	30°12′54″S 151°42′04″E
Ferryman	Armidale Regional Council	30°38′54″S 151°58′04″E
Gara	Armidale Regional Council	30°31′54″S 151°46′04″E
Gostwyck	Uralla Shire Council	30°39′54″S 151°36′04″E
Hargrave	Armidale Regional Council	30°32′54″S 151°59′04″E
Harnham	Uralla Shire Council	30°44′54″S 151°28′04″E
Hillgrove	Armidale Regional Council	30°29′54″S 151°50′04″E
Kentucky	Uralla Shire Council	30°44′54″S 151°24′04″E
Lawrence	Uralla Shire Council	30°44′54″S 151°40′04″E
Merrigalah	Armidale Regional Council	30°42′54″S 151°53′04″E
Metz	Armidale Regional Council	30°32′54″S 151°53′04″E
Mihi	Uralla Shire Council	30°42′54″S 151°38′04″E
Salisbury	Uralla Shire Council	30°44′54″S 151°33′04″E
Saltash	Uralla Shire Council	30°31′54″S 151°26′04″E
Sandon	Uralla Shire Council	30°49′54″S 151°26′04″E
Saumarez	Armidale Regional Council	30°36′54″S 151°41′04″E
Shasta	Armidale Regional Council	30°43′54″S 151°58′04″E
Sobraon	Armidale Regional Council	30°21′54″S 151°28′04″E
Springmount	Armidale Regional Council	30°20′54″S 151°47′04″E
Tilbuster	Armidale Regional Council	30°20′54″S 151°43′04″E
Tiverton	Armidale Regional Council	30°38′54″S 151°46′04″E
Uralla	Uralla Shire Council	30°39′54″S 151°30′04″E
Urotah	Armidale Regional Council	30°29′54″S 151°56′04″E
Wentworth	Armidale Regional Council	30°14′54″S 151°45′04″E
Woolomombi	Armidale Regional Council	30°28′54″S 152°00′04″E
Yarrowick	Uralla Shire Council	30°26′54″S 151°26′04″E
