= Uralla, New South Wales =

Uralla New South Wales
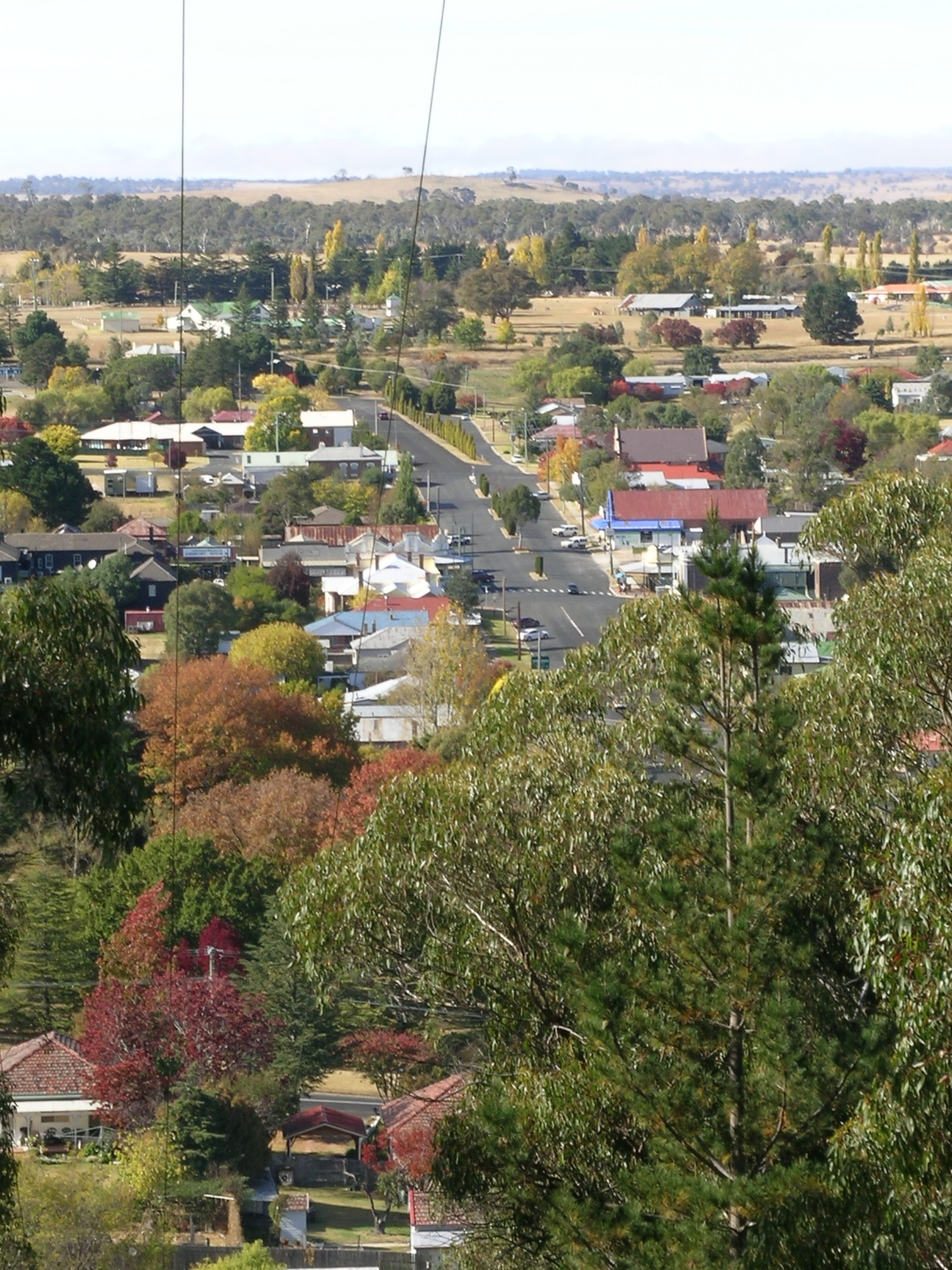
- Uralla, NSW

- Coordinates: 30°38′S 151°29′E
- Population: 2,728 (2021 census)
- Established: 1855
- Postcode(s): 2358
- Elevation: 1,012 m (3,320 ft)
- Location: 465 km (289 mi) NNW of Sydney; 91 km (57 mi) NE of Tamworth; 23 km (14 mi) SW of Armidale
- LGA(s): Uralla Shire
- County: Sandon County
- State electorate(s): Northern Tablelands
- Federal division(s): New England
Mean max temp	Mean min temp	Annual rainfall
19.7 °C; 67 °F	6.3 °C; 43 °F	791.3 mm 31.2 in

Uralla is a town on the Northern Tablelands, New South Wales, Australia. It is located at the intersection of the New England Highway and Thunderbolts Way, 465 kilometres (289 mi) north of Sydney and about 23 kilometres (14 mi) south-west of the city of Armidale. At the 2016 census, the township of Uralla had a population of 2,388. According to the 2021 census, the population of Uralla had increased to 2,728.

At more than 1,000 metres (3,300 ft) above sea level, Uralla's high altitude makes for cool to cold winters and mild summers.

Uralla has maintained significant heritage characteristics, with more than 50 buildings and sites of heritage significance.

During the 1980s and 1990s, the community bought and restored McCrossins Mill, and the complex now operates as a museum, gallery and function centre, run by volunteers. It is also the starting point for a heritage walk.

== History ==
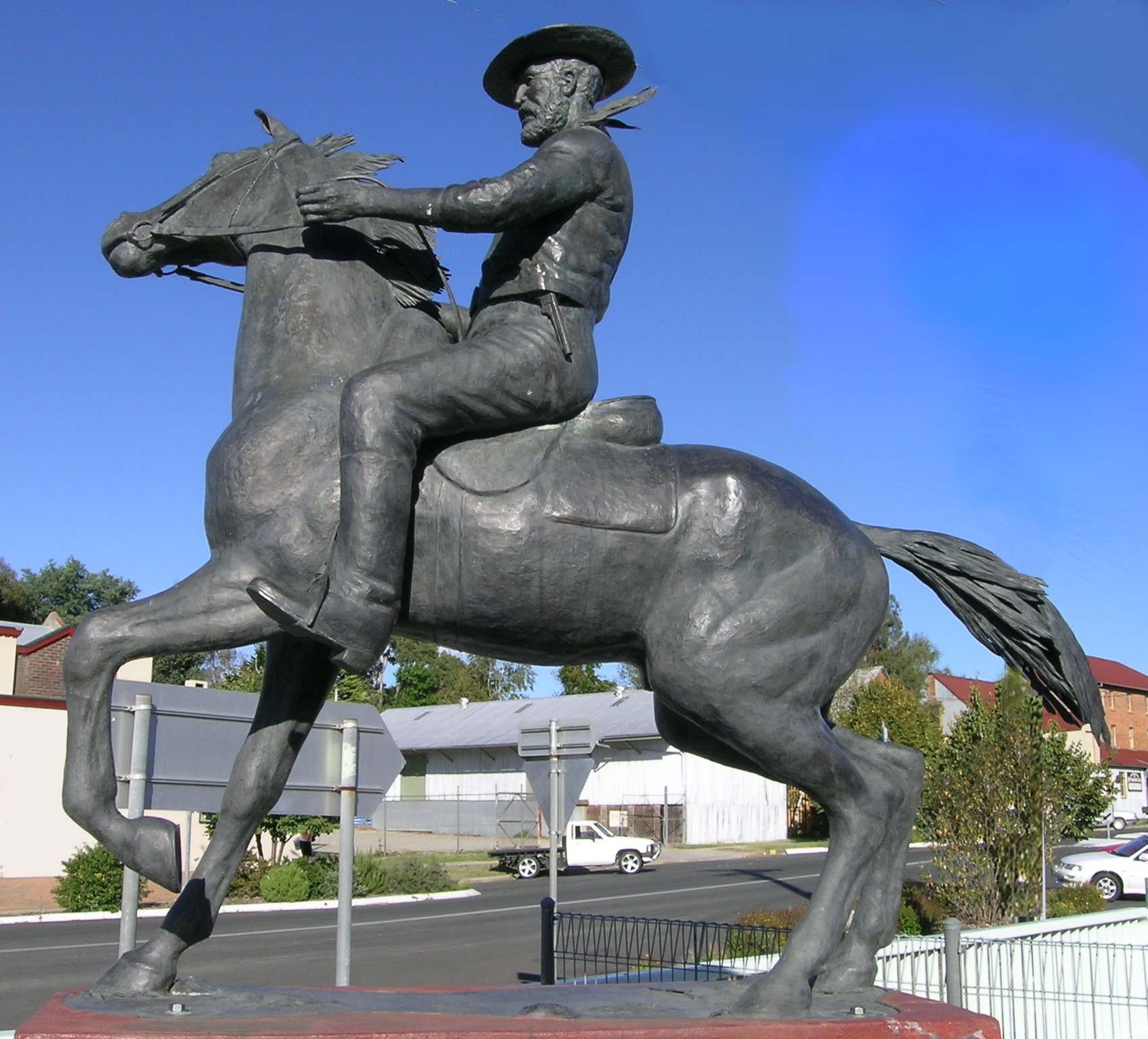
Statue of Captain Thunderbolt at the intersection of New England Highway and Thunderbolts Way, Uralla, NSW

Before European colonisation, the area including Uralla had been occupied for 35,000 years by the indigenous Anēwan people. The name "Uralla" was adopted from the language of the Anēwan by the squatters who first occupied the area. It refers to a ceremonial meeting place or camp.

During the early 1960s, children at the Uralla Public School were taught that the name Uralla was an indigenous word which meant "chain of waterholes", which is an accurate description of the waterway which runs through the town. However, it is not known whether that has been verified by Indigenous linguistic studies.

Samuel McCrossin, an Irishman, his wife, and seven children, first arrived in the Uralla area in 1839 and camped on the creek. They went back to Morpeth but returned to Uralla in 1841, to finally settle there. In the 1830s and 40s, the land began to be occupied by squatters who had moved north, beyond the limit of location set by the government. The squatters were attracted by the prime sheep grazing land of the New England Tableland. Some of the squatting runs were Kentucky, Gostwyck, Balala, Yarrowyck, Mihi Creek, Terrible Vale and Salisbury Court. Some of the station buildings, including Balala and the Gostwyck Chapel, have now been placed on the Register of the National Estate. Some of the land occupied by the squatters was made available to farmers after the passing of the Robertson Land Acts in 1861.

Uralla achieved town status in 1855, spurred by a gold rush in the Rocky River area three years earlier, swelling the town's population to over 5,000. In 1856, another, more considerable gold rush took place, but did not lead to any lasting development. By 1859, Uralla had three hotels, stores, a post office, a flour mill and a school. The Uralla Municipality was incorporated in 1882. In 1948, it became the administrative centre of the Uralla Shire after the municipality was merged with the former Gostwyck Shire. More gold was discovered and mined at Melrose in the Enmore area in about 1887. This discovery led to the erection of the Melrose public school and village, which was about 32 km east of Uralla. In 1927 this area was subdivided for soldier settlement, and ballots were held to determine the new settlers. In about 1889, gold was discovered at Groses Creek, which is 6 km south-west of Enmore, near the Mihi Falls on the eastern side of Uralla.

The infamous bushranger Captain Thunderbolt (Frederick Ward) is buried in the old Uralla Cemetery (John Street). There are many references to Thunderbolt throughout the town, and the locals are quite fond of the legend. In addition to an initially controversial statue in the main street, Uralla is host to a pub, motel, rock (from where Thunderbolt ambushed passing travellers) and roads, all bearing his name. On 25 May 1870, Thunderbolt was shot and killed near Uralla by Constable Alexander Walker during a highway robbery. However, a few Uralla locals claimed that it was his uncle, William (Harry) Ward - posing as Thunderbolt, who was killed at this time and not Fred Ward. The legend of Thunderbolt is exhibited at McCrossin's Mill Museum in Uralla and includes the series of 9 paintings by Phillip Pomroy of the events that led to Fred Ward's death.

During 2008 Uralla recorded the state's highest rise in property values at 35 per cent over the last 12 months, according to a report from Australian Property Monitors.

== Climate ==
Uralla has an oceanic climate (Köppen: Cfb), with warm, stormy summers and cool to cold winters with a few snowfalls and many frosts.

Climate data for Uralla (Dumaresq St, 1938–1967, rainfall 1901–2024); 1012 m AMSL; 30.64° S, 151.49° E
Month	Jan	Feb	Mar	Apr	May	Jun	Jul	Aug	Sep	Oct	Nov	Dec	Year
Mean daily maximum °C (°F)	26.4 (79.5)	25.7 (78.3)	24.0 (75.2)	20.0 (68.0)	15.8 (60.4)	12.8 (55.0)	11.8 (53.2)	13.3 (55.9)	17.0 (62.6)	20.0 (68.0)	23.6 (74.5)	25.9 (78.6)	19.7 (67.4)
Mean daily minimum °C (°F)	12.5 (54.5)	12.7 (54.9)	11.1 (52.0)	6.8 (44.2)	3.0 (37.4)	0.9 (33.6)	−0.4 (31.3)	0.4 (32.7)	2.8 (37.0)	6.2 (43.2)	8.7 (47.7)	11.1 (52.0)	6.3 (43.4)
Average precipitation mm (inches)	102.7 (4.04)	83.9 (3.30)	60.5 (2.38)	39.4 (1.55)	44.2 (1.74)	53.2 (2.09)	55.9 (2.20)	54.1 (2.13)	52.6 (2.07)	71.9 (2.83)	84.7 (3.33)	88.2 (3.47)	791.3 (31.13)
Average precipitation days (≥ 1.0 mm)	7.6	7.0	5.8	4.5	5.0	6.3	6.7	6.2	5.9	7.1	7.8	7.8	77.7
Source: Australian Bureau of Meteorology

== Population ==
Historical population
Year	Pop.	±%
1921	972	—
1933	1,054	+8.4%
1947	1,186	+12.5%
1954	1,121	−5.5%
1961	1,658	+47.9%
1966	1,614	−2.7%
1971	1,754	+8.7%
1976	1,940	+10.6%
1981	2,090	+7.7%
1986	2,250	+7.7%
1991	2,324	+3.3%
1996		—
2001	2,304	—
2006	2,267	−1.6%
2011	2,388	+5.3%
2016	2,421	+1.4%
2021	2,385	−1.5%
Source: Australian Bureau of Statistics data.

According to the 2016 census, the population of Uralla was 2,421:

- Aboriginal and Torres Strait Islander people made up 11.7% of the population.
- 86.7% of people were born in Australia and 93.3% of people spoke only English at home.
- The most common responses for religion were Anglican 28.8%, No Religion 22.8% and Catholic 22.3%.

== Heritage listings ==
Uralla has a number of heritage-listed sites, including:

- 6 East Street: New England Brass and Iron Lace Foundry
- Main Northern railway: Uralla railway station
- Salisbury Street: McCrossins Mill
- Uralla Square: Captain Thunderbolt's Grave
- New England Highway: Blanch's Royal Oak Inn
- New England Highway: Captain Thunderbolt's Rock

== Industries ==
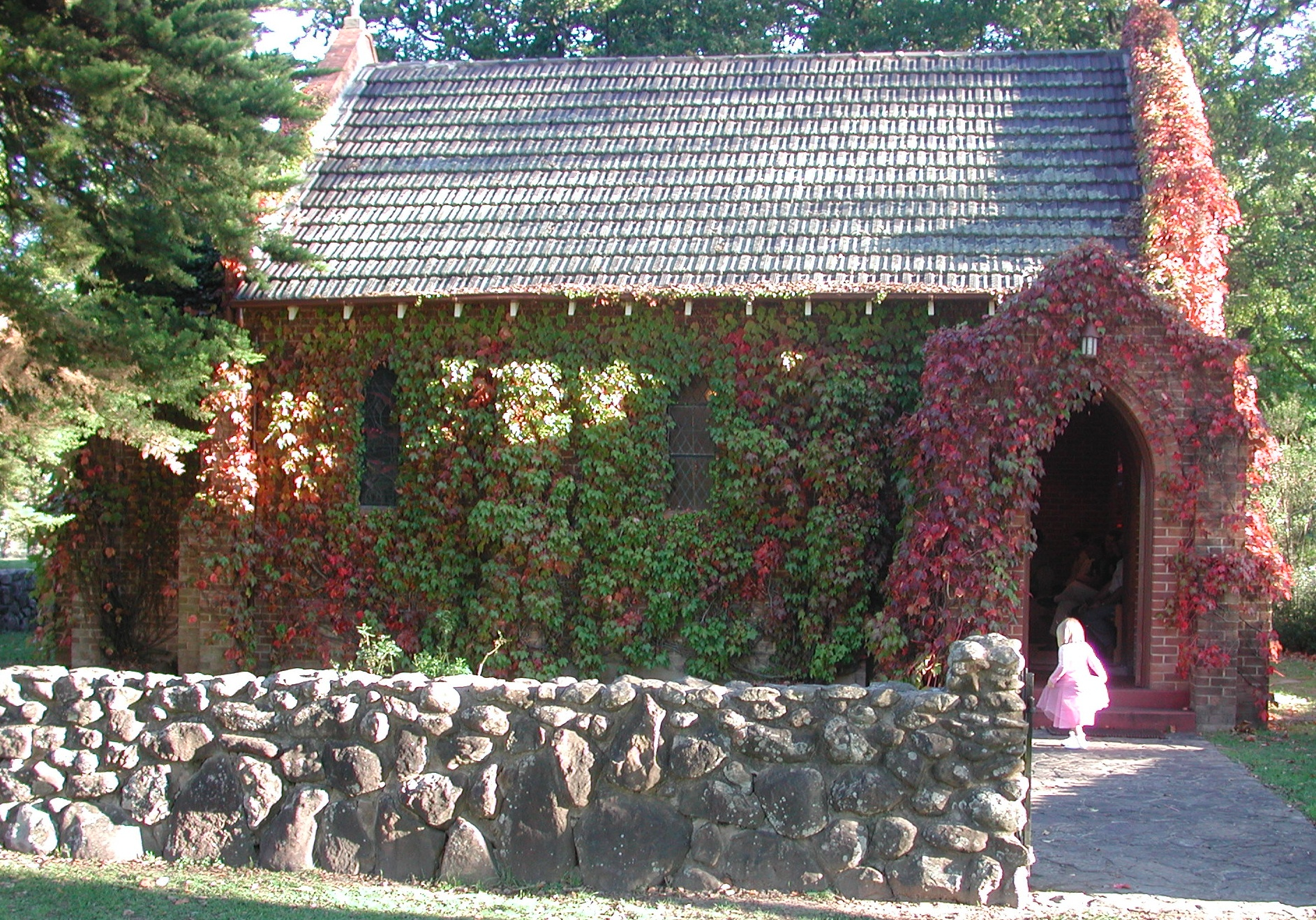
All Saints' Church, Gostwyck, east of Uralla

Three foundries account for a large amount of employment in the town, as do other metal manufacturing businesses. As Uralla is situated about halfway between Sydney and Brisbane, tourism contributes significantly to its economy, with a thriving village atmosphere and 20 National Parks within a two-hour drive. Due to Uralla's proximity to Armidale, larger shopping chains have avoided the small town and independent retailers remain. Examples include an antiquarian book store, numerous galleries, antique stores and cafes.

It is still possible to pan for gold in the rivers around the town, including the Rocky River. Today, the area is used for raising Merino sheep and is renowned for its super-fine and ultra-fine wool for use in the fashion industry. A number of vineyards have also been established and produce a variety of cool-climate wines. It is also a good area for growing apples and other fruit which require colder weather.

Lockheed Martin has erected an Australian satellite tracking station at Uralla.

Uralla is also host to a thriving community of artists and potters, stimulated by proximity to the University of New England in nearby Armidale.

The 2011 census found that the most common industries of all the employed people in the locality were:

- School Education - 6.7%
- Sheep, Beef Cattle and Grain Farming - 5.8%
- Local Government Administration - 5.0%
- Tertiary Education - 4.6%
- Cafes, Restaurants and Takeaway Food Services - 2.9%.

There are a number of environmental problems in the area, mainly caused by poor land management. Soil erosion, due to extensive logging and intensive farm practices is a major issue. Local government and community environmental bodies are now working to halt the problem.

== Uralla Railway Station ==
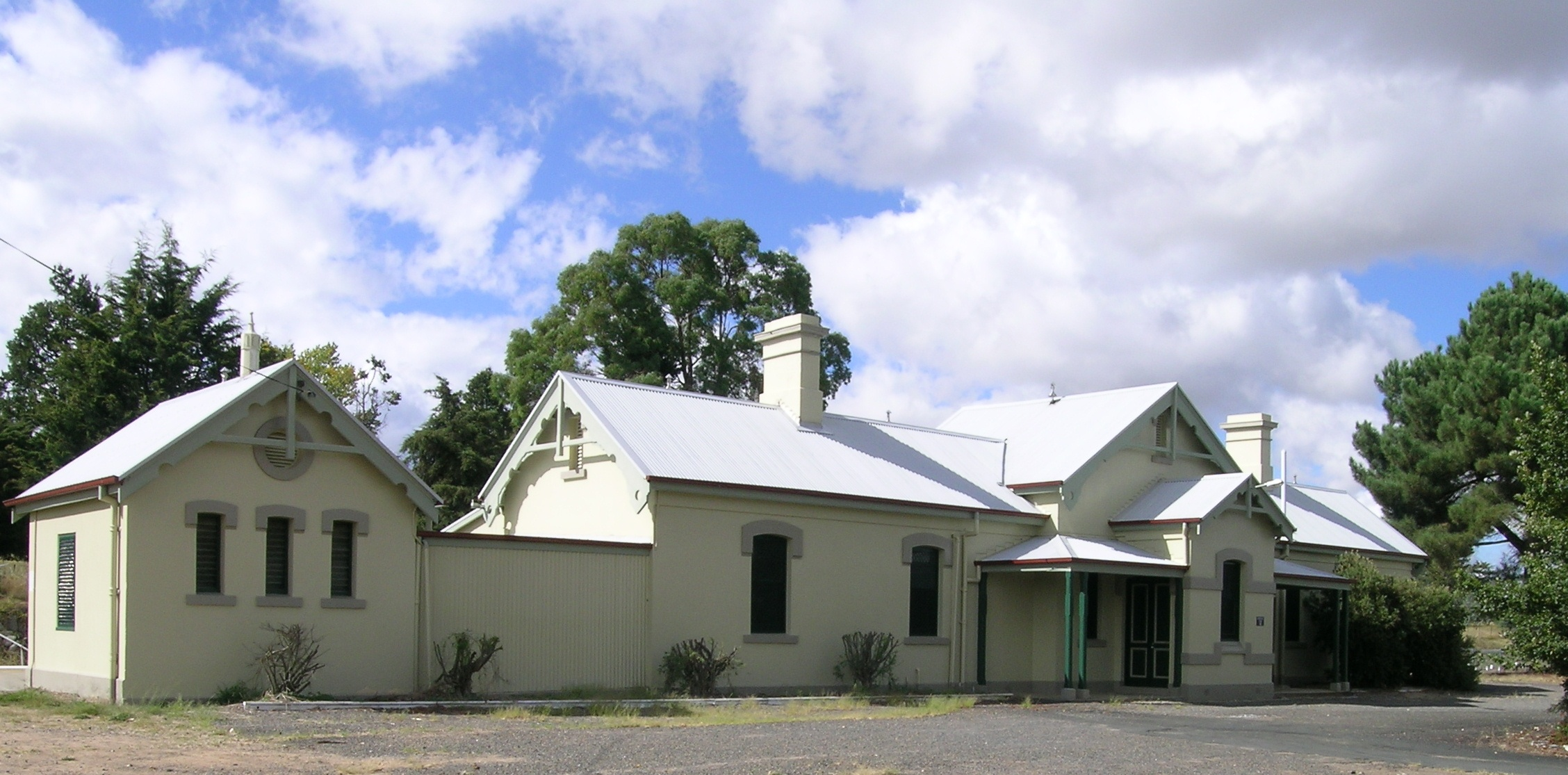
Uralla railway station

Uralla station is served by the daily NSW TrainLink Xplorer service between Armidale and Sydney. The station is 16 minutes by train, from Armidale.

== Gallery ==
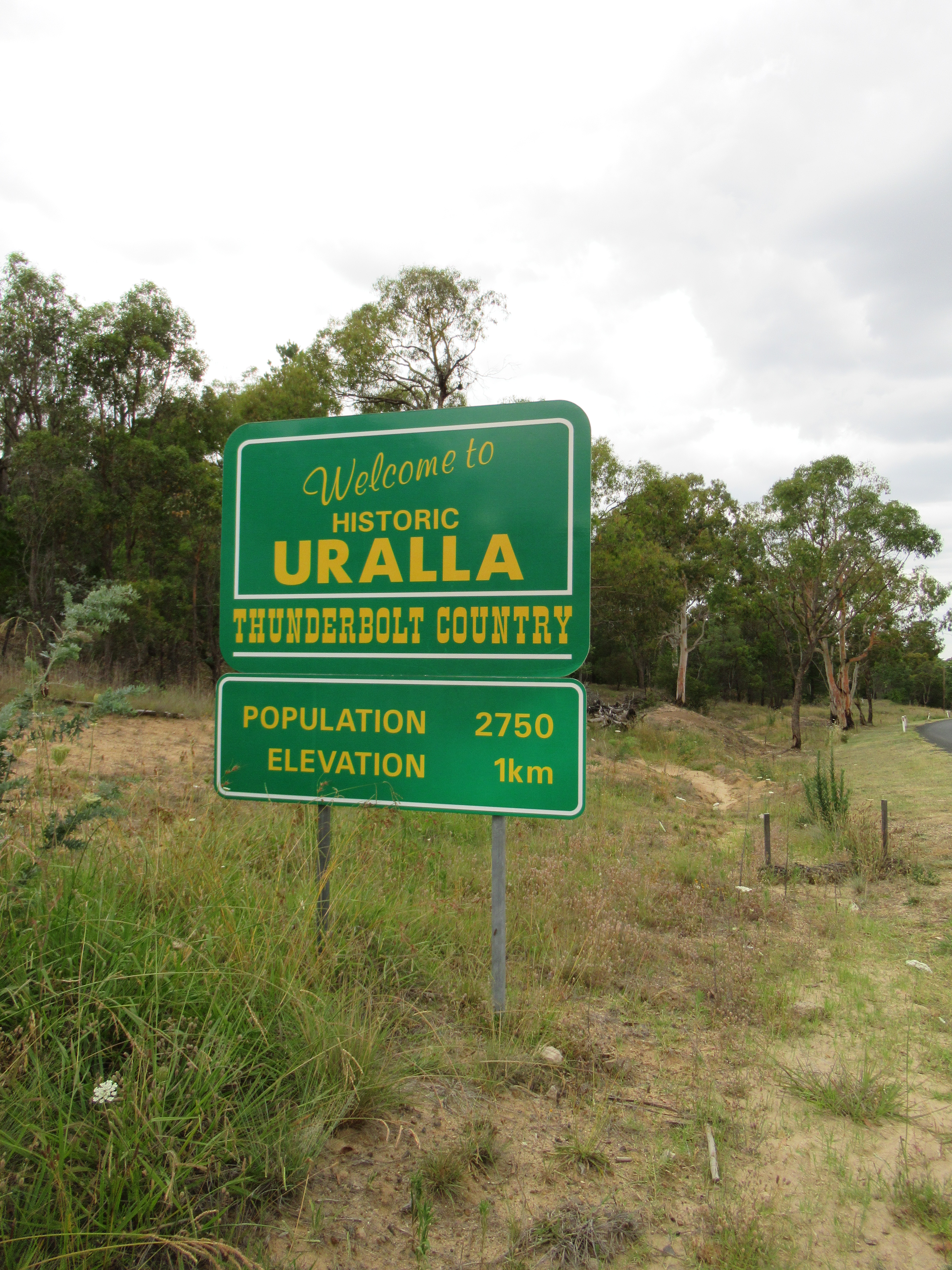
Entry sign

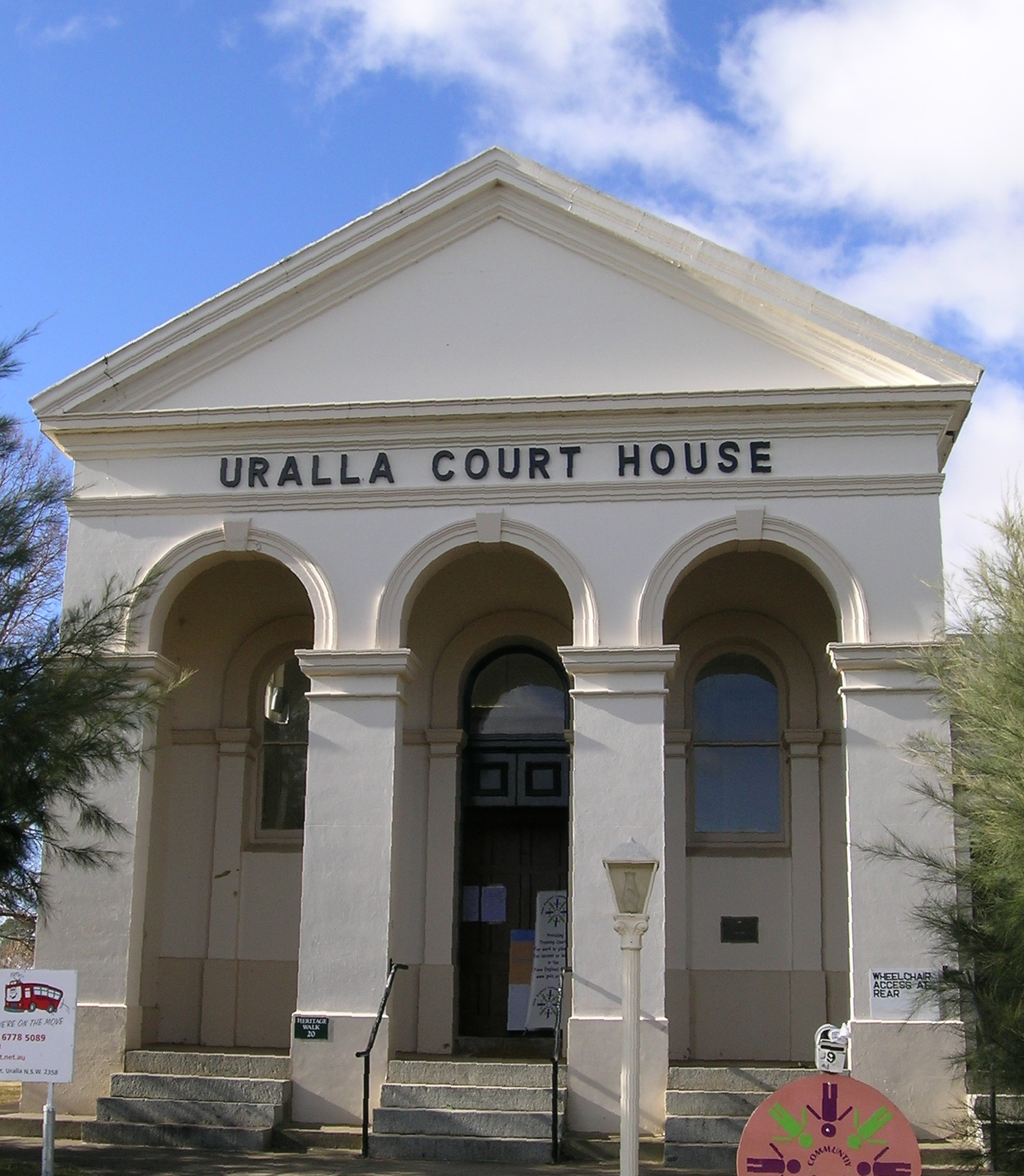
Court House

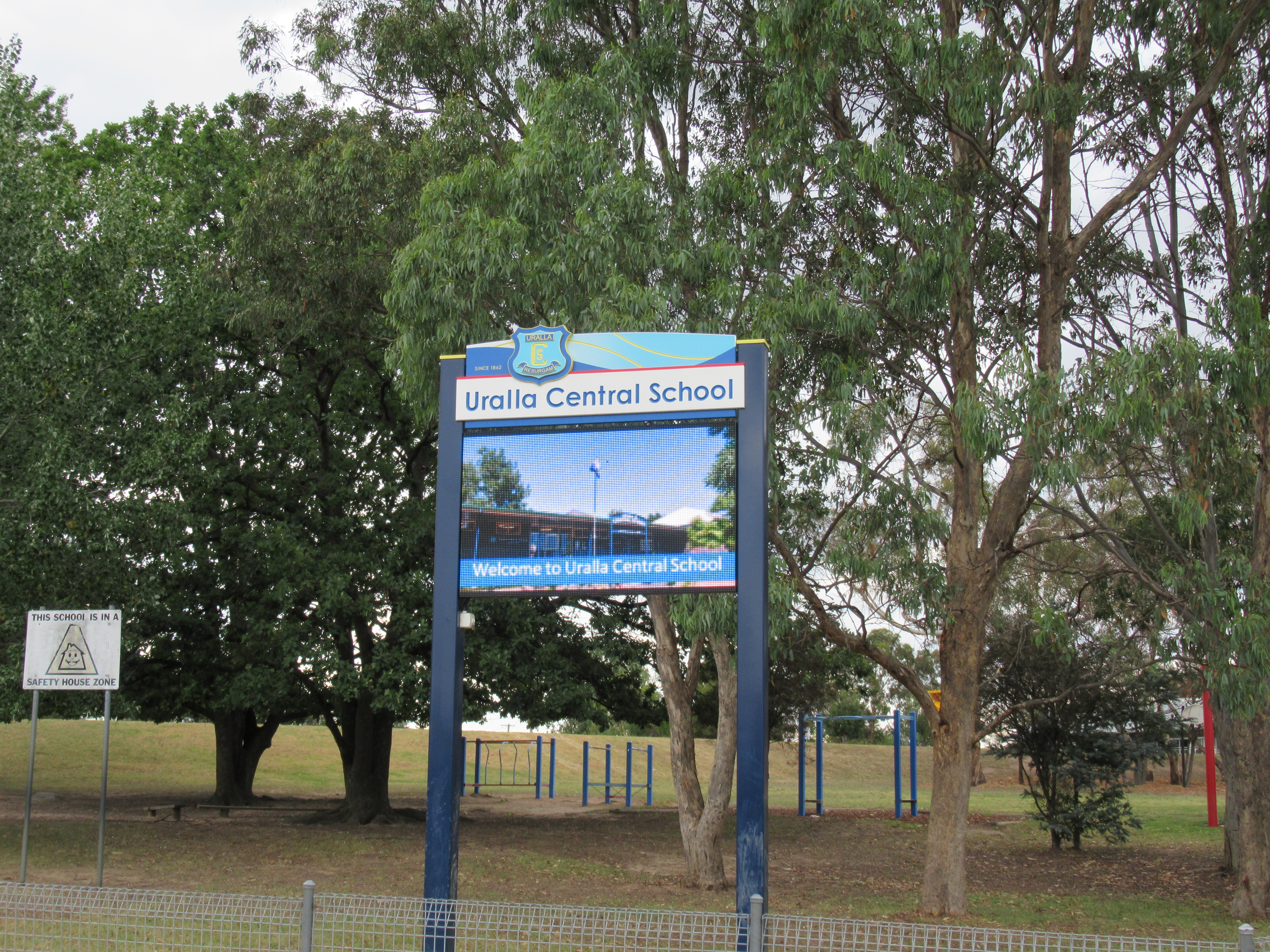
Uralla Central School

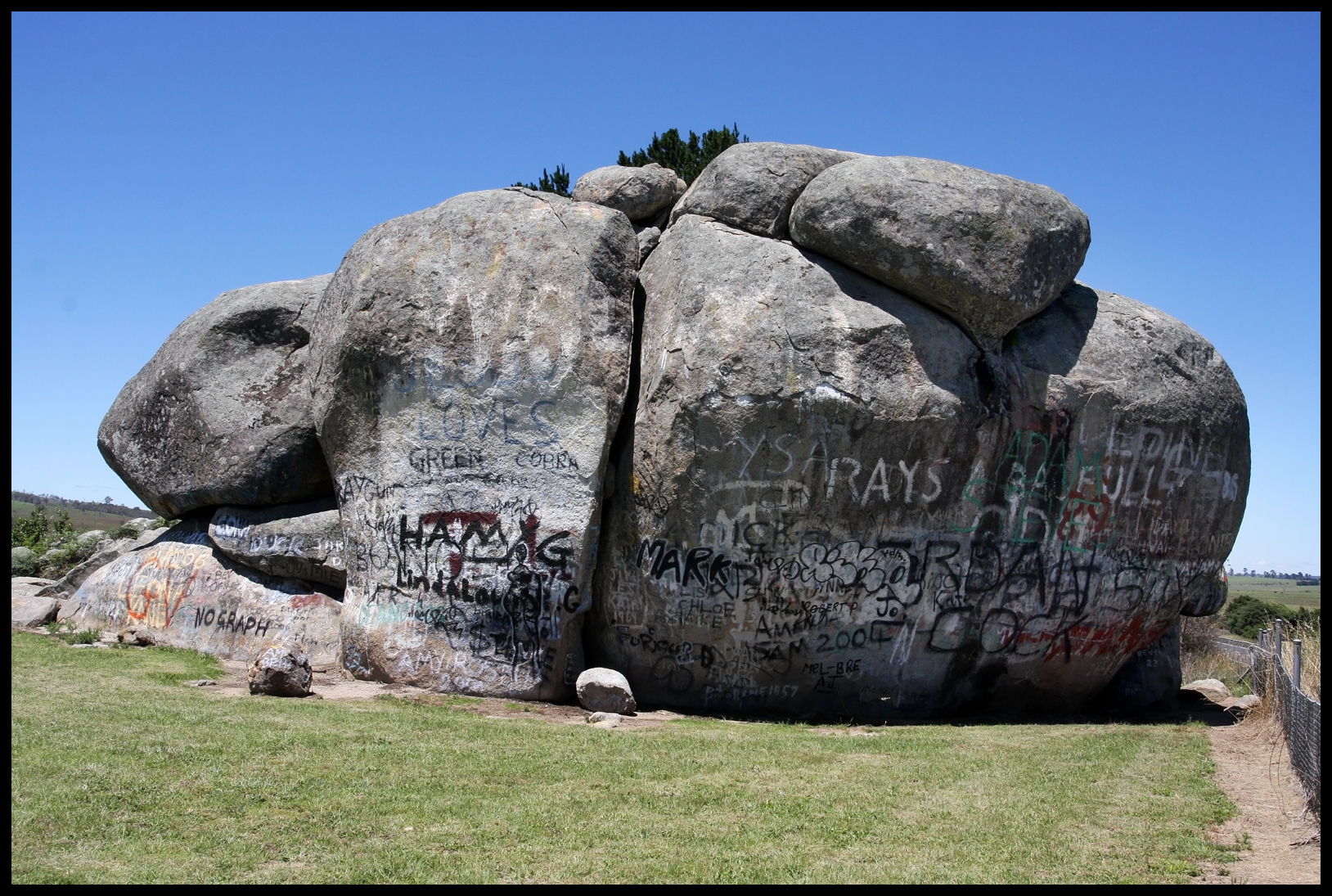
Thunderbolts Rock

== See also ==
- New England (Australia)
