= Drunk History Australia =

Australian television series

- Genre: Comedy
- Based on: Drunk History by Derek Waters
- Written by: Paul Ayre; Benjamin Howling; Daniel Reisinger; Scott Abbott
- Directed by: Daniel Reisinger; Helena Brooks; Jack Steele; Benjamin Howling
- Country of origin: Australia
- Original language: English
- No. of series: 1
- No. of episodes: 7

Production
- Executive producers: Chris Culvenor; Paul Franklin; Benjamin Howling; Sophia Mogford
- Producers: Ashley Davies; Scott Abbott
- Running time: 27–32 minutes
- Production company: Eureka Productions

Original release
- Network: Network Ten
- Release: 20 August 2018 – 26 October 2020

Related
- Drunk History

Drunk History Australia is an Australian educational comedy television series based on the American series of the same name, which is in-turn based on the web series from Funny or Die.

== Description ==
In each episode, an inebriated celebrity struggles to recount a historical event, while actors reconstruct and enact the narrator's anecdotes while lip syncing the dialogue.

In addition to celebrity guest stars, the show's characters are played by regulars such as David Collins, Yvie Jones, Cameron Knight, Adam Dunn, Sara West, Greta Lee Jackson, Aaron Chen, Paul Ayre, Lana Kington, Harry Keep, Seaton Kay-Smith, Bruce Guo, Emma Thompson and Hamish Adams-Cairns.

== Production ==
A pilot was commissioned in 2018 by Network Ten for Pilot Week, in which a 30-minute pilot episode aired along with several other new show pilots. The episode featured stories about Ned Kelly and Phar Lap and was presented by comedians Stephen Curry & Rhys Darby.

The first season was commissioned in 2019 by Network Ten and was released prematurely on 27 March 2020 on their streaming service 10 Play, prior to its official premiere on 14 September 2020.

== Series overview ==
Series	Episodes	Originally released	
Series	Episodes	First released	Last released
Pilot	1	20 August 2018	
1	6	14 September 2020	26 October 2020

== Episodes ==
=== Pilot ===
No. overall	No. in season	Title	Original release date	AUS viewers
1	1	"Pilot"	20 August 2018	367,000
Retellings: Stephen Curry on Ned Kelly; Rhys Darby on Phar Lap; Cast: Gyton Grantley as Ned Kelly; Aaron Glenane as Dan Kelly; Greta Lee Jackson as Constable Lonigan; Ryan Fitzgerald as Phar Lap; David Collins as Tommy Woodcock

=== Series 1 (2020) ===
No. overall	No. in season	Title	Original release date	AUS viewers
2	1	"Episode 1"	14 September 2020	276,000
Retellings: Anne Edmonds on Dame Nellie Melba; Harley Breen on the Burke and Wills expedition Cast: Susie Youssef as Dame Nellie Melba; Darren McMullen as Prince Phillipe d'Orléans; Yvie Jones as Madame Marchesi; James Mathison as Robert O'Hara Burke; Osher Günsberg as William John Wills; Cameron Knight as William Brahe
3	2	"Episode 2"	21 September 2020	310,000
Retellings: Darren McMullen on the story of the Cannibal Convicts; Nikki Osborne on the first Miss Australia, Beryl Mills; Cast: Wayne Hope as Alexander Pearce; Phil Lloyd as Robert Greenhill; Nicholas Boshier as Matthew Travers; Alex Nation as Beryl Mills
4	3	"Episode 3"	28 September 2020	241,000
Retellings: Matt Okine on the story of Waltzing Matilda; Em Rusciano on Dawn Fraser at the 1964 Summer Olympics; Cast: Tex Perkins as Banjo Paterson; Tanya Hennessy as Christina Macpherson; Jane Allsop as Sarah Riley; Bjorn Stewart as Bob McPherson; Erin McNaught as Dawn Fraser; Peter Phelps as Lee Robinson
5	4	"Episode 4"	5 October 2020	310,000
Retellings: James Mathison on the Dismissal of Gough Whitlam; Joel Creasey on the Emu Wars; Cast: Stephen Curry as Gough Whitlam; Bernard Curry as John Kerr; Greta Lee Jackson as Malcolm Fraser; Mark Humphries as Billy Snedden; Phil Lloyd as Major G.P.W. Meredith; Annie Maynard as Sergeant S. McMurray; Trevor Ashley as Carol the Emu
6	5	"Episode 5"	12 October 2020	241,000
Retellings: Brendan Fevola on Abe Saffron aka "Mr Sin"; Steph Tidsell on Mary Ann Bugg, the female bushranger Cast: Les Hill as Abe Saffron; Costa Georgiadis as Jim Anderson; Nakkiah Lui as Shirley Bega; Michelle Brasier as Juanita Nelson; Natasha Wanganeen as Mary Ann Bugg; Grant Denyer as Captain Thunderbolt; Elaine Crombie as Charlotte Bugg
7	6	"Episode 6"	26 October 2020	213,000
Retellings: Heath Franklin on Don Bradman; Becky Lucas on Lillian Armfield; Cast: Dave Hughes as Don Bradman; Bev Killick as Emily Bradman; Leeanna Walsman as Lillian Armfield; Roxy Jacenko as Kate Leigh; Demi Lardner as Botany May Smith

== Controversy ==
The pilot drew mostly positive reviews, but some viewers were unhappy that the show seemed to glamourise excessive binge drinking in a country which has an extensive history of drinking problems.
