= Blanch's Royal Oak Inn =

- Location within New South Wales Location within Australia
- 30°42′06″S 151°27′51″E
- Location: New England Highway, Kentucky, Uralla Shire, New South Wales, Australia

New South Wales Heritage Register
- Official name: The Captain Thunderbolt Sites – Blanch's Royal Oak Inn
- Type: State heritage (archaeological-terrestrial)
- Designated: 20 July 2012
- Reference no.: 1889
- Type: Coach House/Station
- Category: Transport – Land

Blanch's Royal Oak Inn is the heritage-listed site of a former inn on the New England Highway in Kentucky, a village in the New England region of New South Wales, Australia. It is one of a group of historic sites labelled The Captain Thunderbolt Sites for their association with bushranger Captain Thunderbolt, along with Captain Thunderbolt's Rock, Captain Thunderbolt's Death Site, and Captain Thunderbolt's Grave. Collectively, all properties were added to the New South Wales State Heritage Register on 20 July 2012.

== History ==
John Blanch owned a number of properties near Uralla specifically to the south of the township. A Parish Map from 1865 shows that the lot in Church Gully was owned by John Blanch. Although it is not known when Blanch established his inn, it was extant in 1870 and was the site of Thunderbolt's final robbery.

On the afternoon of 25 May 1870 Thunderbolt, who had been in the area for the Uralla races the day before, made his way to Blanch's Inn on the main road. Arriving early in the afternoon he was met by the son of John Blanch who told him that his parents had not yet returned from the races. Riding the approximately 300 metres (980 ft) to Split Rock he waited for the Blanchs and after bailing them up and robbing them, he accompanied them back to the inn.

Sometime after an Italian hawker Giovanni Cappisotti was robbed and held at the Inn by Thunderbolt. Cappisotti was robbed of a number of items including a jewel box, cash, a pair of lady's earrings, some rings, an Albert watch and chain and some gold. These items were used to identify the man later shot by Constable Walker as the thief.

Other customers and travellers were robbed and "invited" to remain for the festivities as they arrived. At some time during the afternoon Cappisotti asked for permission to leave. Thunderbolt gave the permission on the proviso that he travel south, away from Uralla and the police. Cappisotti agreed and headed south to Dorrington's Farm House. Borrowing a saddle he unhitched a horse and circled back around to Uralla; raising the alarm with the police at 4pm.

The Magisterial Inquiry into Thunderbolt's death was held at Blanch's Inn; in order to slow the decomposition of the body Thunderbolt's innards were removed and buried in the yard of the Inn.

== Description ==
There are few extant remains associated with Blanch's Royal Oak Inn. A flagstone associated with a doorway is found within the paddock. The remains of the cellar are also evident. Other archaeological and landscape remnants may provide evidence of the site's previous use.

Introduced tree species including roses are growing adjacent to the site and may be associated with the site's former use.

=== Condition ===
The archaeological potential of the site is considered high; the archaeological resource does not appear to have been greatly disturbed.

Blanch's Royal Oak Inn is no longer extant. The intactness of the archaeological resource is unknown.

== Heritage listing ==
The site of the former Blanch's Royal Oak Inn is significant for its associations with Captain Thunderbolt and the pivotal role it was to play in his death. The story associated with the Inn illustrates Thunderbolt's practice of holding the occupants of the hotel hostage while robbing them. This habit of holding hostages and engaging in parties with those hostages is seen throughout Thunderbolt's career.

The events of the afternoon of 25 May 1870 represent two conflicting societal views of bushrangers at the time: the gentleman bushranger generally supported by the community (as evidenced by the fact that it has been reported the publican's wife raised the alarm that the police were coming); and the criminal to be brought to justice (as evidenced by the actions of the hawker Giovanni Cappisotti and the young drover Coghlan/Coughlan, who forced the fleeing Thunderbolt away from the road towards Kentucky Creek, who were actively involved with his capture).

Although no longer extant, the site of Blanch's Royal Oak Inn is representative of the type of place targeted by bushrangers in the latter half of the nineteenth century.

The Captain Thunderbolt Sites – Blanch's Royal Oak Inn was listed on the New South Wales State Heritage Register on 20 July 2012, having satisfied the relevant criteria.

The site of Blanch's Royal Oak Inn demonstrates the type of place targeted by bushrangers in the latter half of the nineteenth century and was the site of his last robbery, which directly led to his death. Although the archaeological resources are not likely to be of State Heritage significance of itself, the remains are likely to provide information on the use and functioning of a nineteenth century inn site.

The Inn represents Captain Thunderbolt's habit of engaging in parties with hostages which occurred throughout his career with specific instances reported in the press at Quirindi, Carroll and Millie.

It does not fulfil the following criterion:

- Demonstrating aesthetic characteristics and/or a high degree of creative or technical achievement in New South Wales.
- A strong or special association with a particular community or cultural group in New South Wales for social, cultural or spiritual reasons.
- Possessing uncommon, rare or endangered aspects of the cultural or natural history of New South Wales.

== See also ==
- Captain Thunderbolt's Rock
- Captain Thunderbolt's Death Site
- Captain Thunderbolt's Grave
