= Natasha Wanganeen =

Aboriginal Australian actress

- Born: 20 June 1984 (age 42); Point Pearce, South Australia, Australia
- Occupations: Actor, writer, producer
- Years active: 2001–present
- Relatives: Gavin Wanganeen, Trevor Jamieson
- Awards: AFI Young Actor's Award, 2004

Natasha Wanganeen (born 20 June 1984) is an Aboriginal Australian actress. She is known for her starring role in the 2002 feature film Rabbit-Proof Fence and numerous television roles. She made her debut as co-writer and co-producer in a 2022 short film, an Indigenous sci-fi drama entitled Bunker: The Last Fleet, about an alien invasion of Australia. She also played the lead in the film.

== Early life ==
Wanganeen was born in Point Pearce, South Australia, moving to Port Adelaide when she was five years old. She is a Ngarrindjeri, Narungga, Kaurna and Noongar woman.

== Career ==
Wanganeen appeared in Rabbit-Proof Fence (released 2002), playing a dormitory boss at the age of 15, and the made-for-TV film Jessica directed by Peter Andrikidis and released in 2004.

In 2017, she starred as a zombie-killer in the dystopian thriller Cargo. Also in 2017, she played the role of Gilyagan in Kate Grenville's play The Secret River presented during the Adelaide Festival in March, having previously played a different role in the 2015 two-part TV series of the same name.

She played Mary, mother of a talented gymnast, in feature film A Second Chance: Rivals!, released in 2019, and in the same year played a ghoul in the horror film Dark Place.

In June 2020, Wanganeen was writing a script for her own independent film, Battle of the Ancestors, set 60,000 years ago against a backdrop of Aboriginal mythology, including Dreamtime stories and characters she knows from here childhood years. She is being supported by Screen Australia and the South Australian Film Corporation in this endeavour, and is in talks with local production companies who are interested in seeing it made.

Wanganeen was on the jury for the Feature Fiction and Documentary awards at the 2020 Adelaide Film Festival.

Television roles include playing Mary Ann Bugg, a late 19th-century bushranger, in Drunk History Australia (Network 10, 2020) and a chef in Aftertaste (Closer Productions/ABC Comedy, 2021). She plays a government official in 2067, a sci-fi thriller feature film directed by Seth Larney released in 2020.

Originally intended as a sci-fi series, Bunker: The Last Fleet, co-written by Wanganeen, Stephen Potter, and Rowan Pullen, directed by the latter two, and co-produced by the three of them and others, was inspired by Afrofuturism. It was first released as a short film, with the intention of growing into a feature film. It had its Australian premiere at the St Kilda Film Festival in June 2022, with multiple screenings following around Australia (including Revelation Perth International Film Festival and Adelaide Film Festival) and internationally. Wanganeen plays Tjarra, an Aboriginal warrior in Australia 37 years in the future, and Kaurna elder Uncle Fred Agius plays the role of an elder. Trevor Jamieson (who is a cousin) gave cultural advice and also plays a role in the film. The film was filmed entirely in the South Australian desert. As the first Aboriginal sci-fi move, it is described as a "cheeky take on the First Fleet in Australia".

In 2023, she appeared in Ivan Sen's mystery crime drama Limbo, which was nominated in 'competition section' at the 73rd Berlin International Film Festival, to be held from February 16 to 26, 2023.

== Filmography ==
=== Films ===
Year	Title	Role	Type
2002	Rabbit Proof Fence	Nina, Dormitory Boss	Feature film
2002	Australian Rules	Nunga family member (uncredited)	Feature film
2002	Black and White	Extra (uncredited)	Feature film
2017	Cargo	Josie Bell, a zombie	Feature film
2018	Konya	Angelica	Short film
2018	Wild	Rosie	Short film
2018	White Lies	Nurse Lilian	Short film
2019	Storm Boy	Susan Franklin	Feature film
2019	Dark Place	Ghoul	Segment: Killer Native
2019	A Second Chance: Rivals!	Mary	Feature film
2020	Waiyiri	Lacardi	Short film
2020	2067	Government Official	Feature film
2020	A Sunburnt Christmas	Nurse	Feature film
2021	Djaambi	Tjarrah	Short film
2022	Fate of the Night	Kate	Feature film
2022	Bunker: The Last Fleet	Tjarra	Short film
2022	The Survival of Kindness	Waiting Woman	Feature film
2023	Limbo	Emma	Feature film

=== Television ===
Year	Title	Role	Type
2004	Jessica	Mary Simpson	Miniseries
2004	Through My Eyes	Interpreter	Miniseries, 2 episodes
2007	Sacred Ground	Narrator	Documentary
2013	Redfern Now	Emily	TV series, 1 episode
2015	The Secret River		
2017	Lost in Pronunciation	Woman in pub	TV series, 1 episode
2018	Sisters		Online miniseries
2019	Lucy and DIC	Christina	TV series, 8 episodes
2020	Drunk History Australia	Mary Ann Bugg	TV series, 1 episode
2021	Aftertaste	Line Cook	TV series, 1 episode
2021-22	Firebite	Rona	TV series, 8 episodes
2022	The Tourist	CCTV Gift Shop Employee	TV series, 2 episodes
2022	MaveriX	Trish Peterson	TV series, 6 episodes
2022	The Australian Wars	Enslaved Woman	Miniseries, 1 episode

== Theatre ==
Year	Title	Role	Venue
2017	The Secret River	Gillyagan	Adelaide Festival

== Awards ==
- 2004 – AFI Young Actor's Award, for Jessica

== Activism ==
In 2018, Wanganeen advocated for greater cultural diversity in Australian screen culture, saying "There are not enough black faces on our screens and talking about it is a constructive conversation that we need to have". She expressed her pleasure at the portrayal of Aboriginal people in Cargo (2017) as "living free and strong on the land".

Wanganeen was one of the organisers of the Black Lives Matter protest in Adelaide on 6 June 2020, which focussed on racism and injustices against Indigenous Australians, in particular high rates of incarceration and Aboriginal deaths in custody.

== Personal life ==
As of 2017 Wanganeen lives in Port Adelaide. She is related to Australian rules footballer Gavin Wanganeen, and actor and playwright Trevor Jamieson is a cousin.
