= Beryl Mills =

First Miss Australia (1907–1977)

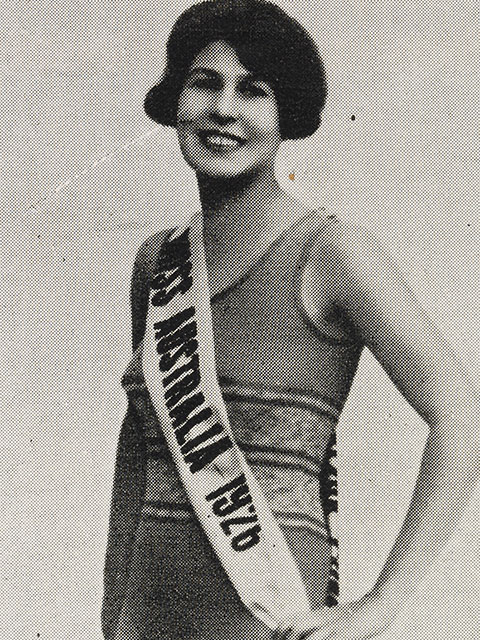
Beryl Mills, Miss Australia 1926.

Beryl Lucy Mills (3 January 1907 – 13 July 1977) was an advertising agent, librarian, and beauty pageant titleholder. She was the first woman to win the Miss Australia quest in 1926

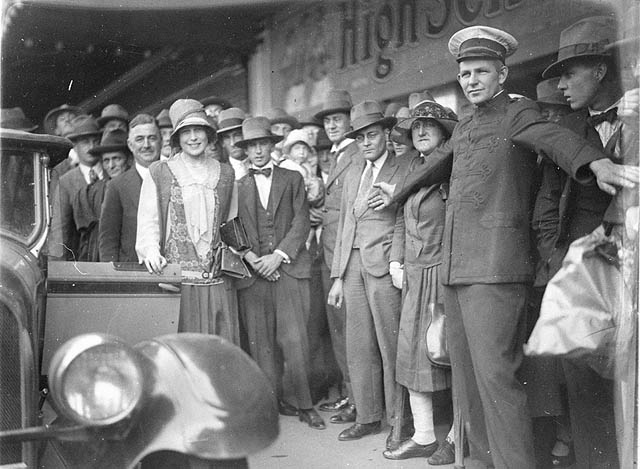
First "Miss Australia", Beryl Mills of Western Australia, 1927, photographed by Sam Hood

== Early life ==
Beryl Lucy Mills was born on 3 January 1907 at Walkaway, Western Australia, the fifth child of parents Frank Ernest Mills and his wife Kitty, née Gibbons. After winning a scholarship to the University of Western Australia in 1924 and studying languages, she was admitted to Claremont Training College.

== Career ==
=== Beauty queen ===
Beryl Mills was an entrant in the inaugural Miss Australia contest run by Smith's Newspapers Ltd, owners of Smith's Weekly and The Guardian. After initial success as Miss Westralia, she entered and won the national competition in June 1926 in Sydney. Her winnings included 1000 pounds, two cars, and a promotional tour of the United States. She was accompanied by her mother and Sir Frank Packer and was a guest of the Miss America pageant at Atlantic City. Her tour included laying a wreath on the grave of an ANZAC soldier buried in the Presidio Cemetery, a guided tour of University of California Berkeley campus, and a visit to the White House, where she was invited to meet President Calvin Coolidge.

=== Advertising agent ===
In Sydney in 1928 she established the Beryl Mills Advertising Service before moving to Melbourne in the 1930s.

== Personal life ==
Beryl Mills married journalist Francis Keith Davison on 19 March 1928 at St Michael's Anglican Church, Vaucluse, Sydney. They moved to Melbourne where daughter Judith was born in 1935.

Mills returned to Sydney by 1941 and became librarian at Frank Packer's Consolidated Press Ltd. She met Major Leslie Garland Calder, and they moved to the United States and married on 19 December 1946 in Virginia. She became a naturalized American and moved to Florida in her husband's retirement. She died there at Punta Gorda on 13 July 1977.

== In popular culture ==
In 2019, Beryl Mills' story was turned into a two-act musical. Titled Miss Westralia, the show was created by Madeline Clouston, Jake Nielsen, Amelia Burke and Matthew Predny. It was first presented at The Blue Room Theatre in Perth, Western Australia. Miss Westralia subsequently toured regional WA in 2021 and has since been renamed Tall Poppy: A New Australian Musical.

== See also ==
- Rosemary Fenton
- Tania Verstak
