= In a Corner on the Macintyre =

Painting by Tom Roberts

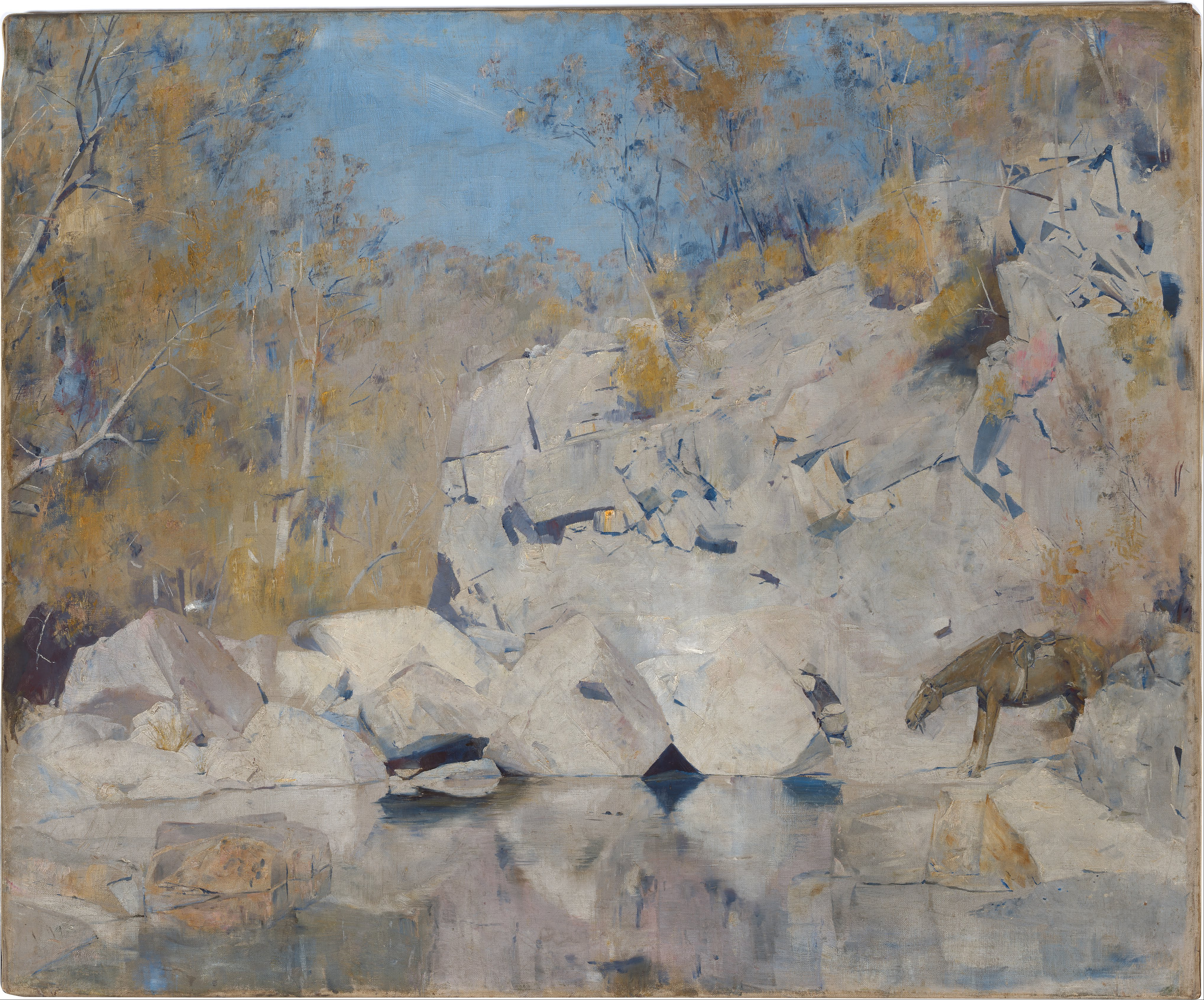
- Artist: Tom Roberts
- Year: 1895
- Medium: oil on canvas
- Dimensions: 71.1 cm × 86.4 cm (28.0 in × 34.0 in)
- Location: National Gallery of Australia; Canberra

In a Corner on the Macintyre (Thunderbolt in an encounter with police at Paradise Creek) is an 1895 painting by the Australian artist Tom Roberts. The painting is thought to depict the bushranger Captain Thunderbolt in a shootout with police.

Roberts painted the picture while staying at Newstead, a station near Inverell, New South Wales, where he also painted his other significant bushranging work Bailed up.

The painting was acquired by the National Gallery of Australia in 1971.

== See also ==
- List of paintings by Tom Roberts
