= Captain Thunderbolt's Grave =

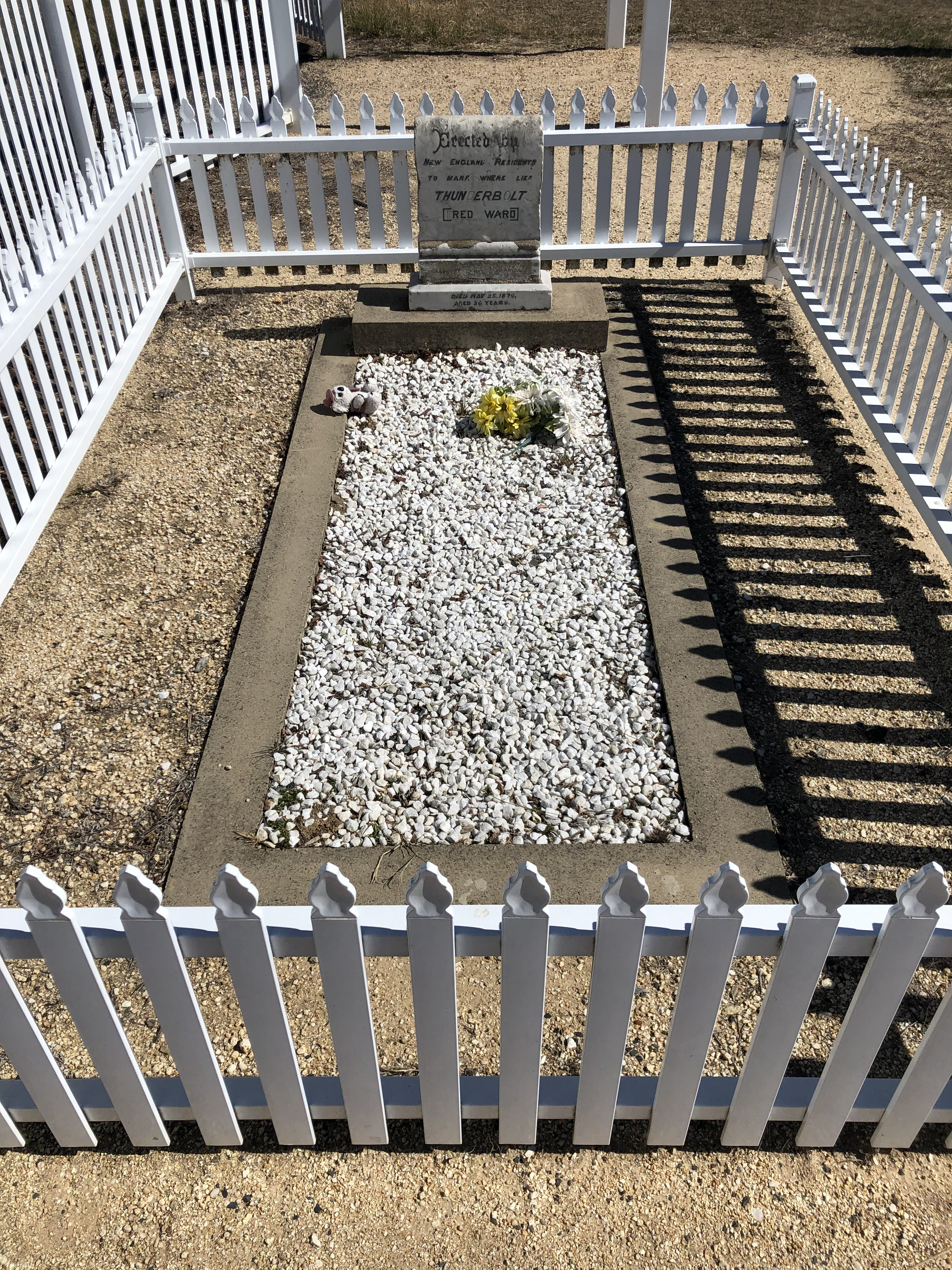
- Captain Thunderbolt’s grave at Uralla in 2019

- Location within New South Wales Location within Australia
- 30°38′30″S 151°29′34″E
- Location: Uralla Square, Uralla, Uralla Shire, New South Wales, Australia

History
- Built: 1914

Site notes
- Architect: Headstone – Mr Callcott

New South Wales Heritage Register
- Official name: The Captain Thunderbolt Sites – Thunderbolt's Grave; Uralla Old General Cemetery
- Type: State heritage (landscape)
- Designated: 20 July 2012
- Reference no.: 1889
- Type: Headstone
- Category: Cemeteries and Burial Sites
- Builders: Mr Calltott

Captain Thunderbolt's Grave is a heritage-listed burial site located at Uralla Square in Uralla, a town in the New England region of New South Wales, Australia. The grave comprises a marble headstone, designed by Mr Callcott, and built in 1914. It is also known as Uralla Old General Cemetery. It is one of a group of historic sites labelled The Captain Thunderbolt Sites for their association with bushranger Captain Thunderbolt, along with Captain Thunderbolt's Rock, Blanch's Royal Oak Inn, and Captain Thunderbolt's Death Site. Collectively, all properties were added to the New South Wales State Heritage Register on 20 July 2012.

== History ==
Uralla Cemetery was established in the 1850s and used until the 1930s.

The cemetery contains the graves of many local notable families including the Blanch's. After the magisterial inquiry held at Blanch's Inn, Captain Thunderbolt's body was moved to Uralla and he remained unburied for a number of days. On 29 May 1870 his body was identified by William Monckton who had ridden with Thunderbolt some years earlier. That afternoon it was taken to be buried in an unmarked grave at Uralla cemetery.

In 1914 a gravestone was erected by local residents, the majority of the costs being born by a Mr L. A. Crap.

== Description ==
The marble headstone has the following inscription:

Erected by

NEW ENGLAND RESIDENTS

TO MARK WHERE LIES

THUNDERBOLT

[FRED WARD]

CALLCOTT ARMIDALE

DIED MAY 25. 1870,

AGED 36 YEARS

The headstone and grave is surrounded by a picket fence. The grave is located at the southern boundary of the Uralla Cemetery; the location of the grave is signposted.

=== Condition ===
As at 10 April 2012, the condition was assessed as fair. The picket fencing was new but the gravestone shows signs of spalling and some of the makers information is difficult to discern.

=== Modifications and dates ===
The picket fencing was installed in 2011.

== Heritage listing ==
Captain Thunderbolt's Grave was listed on the New South Wales State Heritage Register on 20 July 2012 having satisfied the following criteria.

The place is important in demonstrating the course, or pattern, of cultural or natural history in New South Wales.

Captain Thunderbolt's Grave adds to the State significance of the Captain Thunderbolt Sites as the final part of Thunderbolt's story.

The place has a strong or special association with a person, or group of persons, of importance of cultural or natural history of New South Wales's history.

The grave is associated with Captain Thunderbolt the bushranger who was buried there on 29 May 1870. The grave adds to the significance of the Captain Thunderbolt Sites because it is the burial place of Captain Thunderbolt who became notorious in his own time and is well known by the Australian public.

The place has a strong or special association with a particular community or cultural group in New South Wales for social, cultural or spiritual reasons.

Thunderbolt's grave adds to the State significance of the Captain Thunderbolt sites for the social significance attached to it by the community. Captain Thunderbolt has captured the minds of the public as a gentleman bushranger type character. Grave sites and the memorialisation of the dead is intimately connected to this process.

The place has potential to yield information that will contribute to an understanding of the cultural or natural history of New South Wales.

The grave has significance at a local level. The forensic remains may reveal more information about the way he died and the burial customs of the times. Any controversy surrounding the question of who was actually shot by Constable Walker on 25 May 1870 may be able to be resolved upon forensic examination of the remains.

The place is important in demonstrating the principal characteristics of a class of cultural or natural places/environments in New South Wales.

The marking of the grave is representative of public sentiment surrounding Thunderbolt as a well known historic figure.

== See also ==
- Captain Thunderbolt's Rock
- Blanch's Royal Oak Inn
- Captain Thunderbolt's Death Site
