= Jan Taylor (model) =

Australian beauty queen (born 1942)

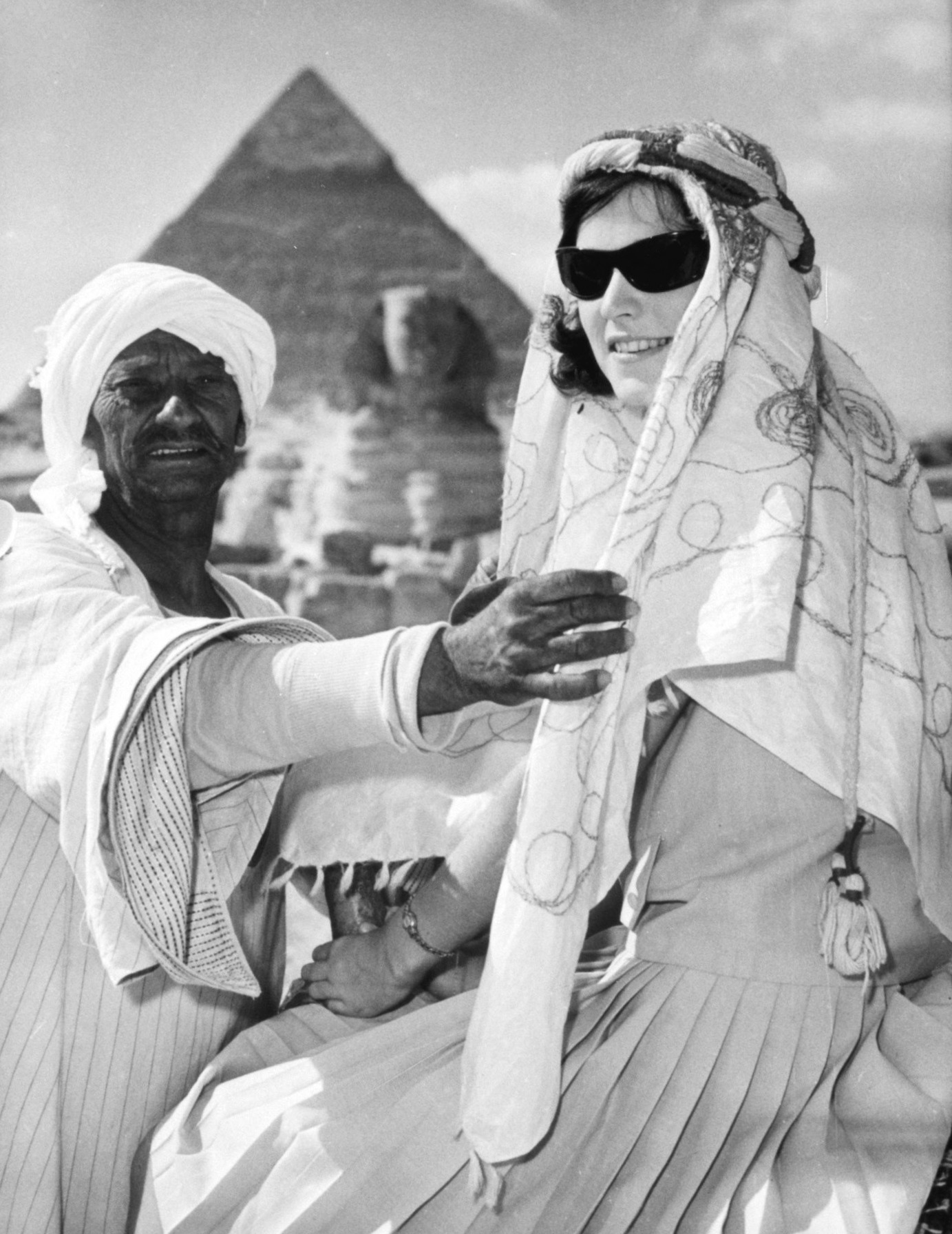
- Taylor in Egypt in 1964 as part of her Miss Australia sponsored world tour
- Born: 1942 (age 82–83); Brisbane, Australia
- Height: 5 ft 7 in (1.70 m)

Jan Taylor (born 1942) was an Australian model and beauty pageant titleholder who won Miss Australia 1964.

Taylor had three brothers, Paul (born 1939); Gerard (born 1947) and Jim (born 1956). She was educated at Lourdes Hill College and St. Rita's College and in the 1960s worked as a television script assistant in Brisbane.

Early Miss Australia competitions were rather conservative, and Taylor was cleared to compete only after approval from her local priest. Her prizes at Miss Australia 1964 included a £750 dress, a car, and a world tour.
