= Captain Thunderbolt's Rock =

Thunderbolt's Rock
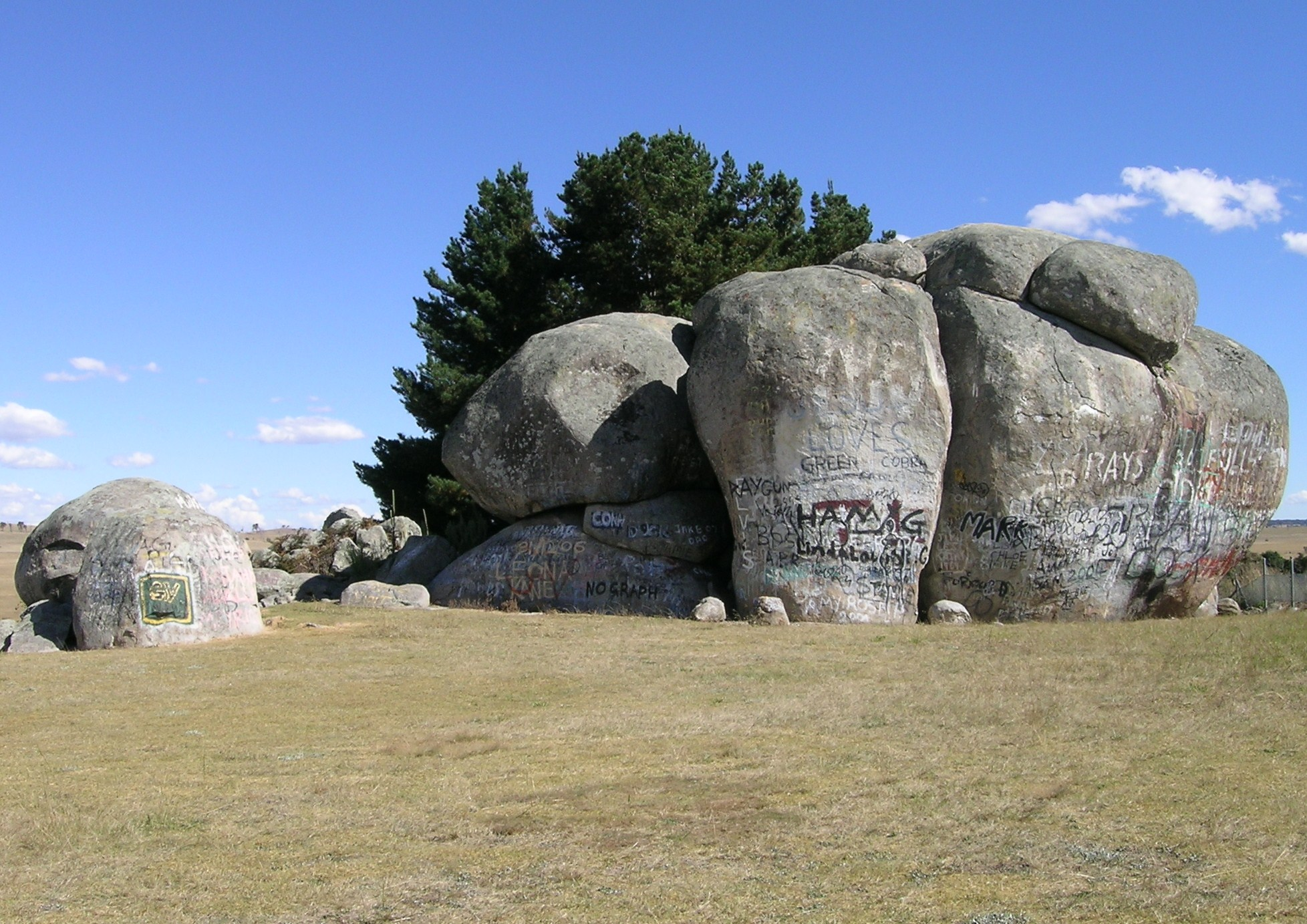

- Location within New South Wales Location within Australia
- 30°41′52″S 151°28′07″E
- Location: New England Highway, Uralla, Uralla Shire, New South Wales, Australia

Site notes
- Owner: Uralla Shire Council

New South Wales Heritage Register
- Official name: The Captain Thunderbolt Sites – Thunderbolt's Rock; Split Rock; Big Rock
- Type: State heritage (landscape)
- Designated: 20 July 2012
- Reference no.: 1889
- Type: Geological site or area
- Category: Landscape – Natural

Thunderbolt's Rock is a heritage-listed rock and now picnic site and tourist attraction located adjacent to the New England Highway in Uralla, a town in the New England region of New South Wales, Australia. It is also known as Split Rock and Big Rock. The property is owned by Uralla Shire Council. It is one of a group of historic sites labelled The Captain Thunderbolt Sites for their association with bushranger Captain Thunderbolt, along with Blanch's Royal Oak Inn, Captain Thunderbolt's Death Site, and Captain Thunderbolt's Grave. Collectively, all properties were added to the New South Wales State Heritage Register on 20 July 2012.

== History ==
On 27 October 1863, less than three months after escaping from Cockatoo Island, Fred Ward and Fred Britten lay in wait for the mail at Split Rock. Due to the increase in bushranging a police escort accompanied the mail to Uralla. The bushrangers were surprised by Sergeant Stephen Grainger and Senior Constable Reynolds.

A shootout ensued with the bushrangers escaping through the boggy ground of Church Gully (south of Thunderbolt's Rock). During the escape Fred Ward was shot through the back of the left knee and was later given medical assistance by a team of saw-pit men who confirmed the injury. Differing accounts were provided of who actually shot Fred Ward; Grainger or Reynolds.

Seven years later Split Rock was to provide the first setting for Thunderbolt's last hold-up and final day. On the afternoon of 25 May Thunderbolt met the Blanchs at Split Rock, robbed them and then accompanied the pair back to their Inn.

Thunderbolt's Rock provides an excellent vantage point to survey the surrounding countryside and in the bushranging career of Fred Ward is in the vicinity of many of his robberies. It is unknown when the name of the site was changed from Split Rock to Thunderbolt's Rock but this change reflects the connection of this site with Captain Thunderbolt both physically and within the psyche of the local community.

== Description ==
Thunderbolt's Rock is a huge cluster of granite rocks located approximately 7 kilometres (4.3 mi) south of Uralla on the New England Highway.

=== Condition ===
As at 5 April 2012, good, although the site is heavily covered with graffiti.

The integrity of the rock is high.

=== Modifications and dates ===
There is a small carpark and picnic table located behind the rocks

== Heritage listing ==
As at 5 April 2012, Thunderbolt's Rock (originally known as Split Rock or Big Rock) contributes to the State significance of the Captain Thunderbolt sites as one of the first sites associated with the transition of Frederick Ward from escapee to bushranger after his escape from Cockatoo Island in 1863.

His attempted hold up of the mail at this site in November 1863 led to an altercation with police during which he was shot in the left knee; an event that was to prove important in his identification after his death in 1870. The shooting also is thought to have been an important formative event in the modus operandi of Captain Thunderbolt, preferring to run from, rather than face, police.

Thunderbolt's Rock contributes to the State significance of the Captain Thunderbolt Sites as a site recognised by the public to be associated with Captain Thunderbolt. Captain Thunderbolt is one of New South Wales' best known bushrangers and is well known in the Uralla region of NSW. Thunderbolt's Rock is well marked and is a popular tourist destination.

Thunderbolt's Rock contributes to the State significance of The Captain Thunderbolt Sites as being representative of the type of places used by bushrangers to hold up coaches and travellers. Thunderbolt's Rock is an identifiable location of a highway robbery and being a high point provides excellent views of the surrounding countryside. The majority of roadside robberies by bushrangers took place at locations without relocatable landmarks. Aesthetically Thunderbolt's Rock is an impressive landmark on the New England Highway from Uralla to Tamworth.

The Captain Thunderbolt Sites – Thunderbolt's Rock was listed on the New South Wales State Heritage Register on 20 July 2012 having satisfied the following criteria.

The place has a strong or special association with a person, or group of persons, of importance of cultural or natural history of New South Wales's history.

Thunderbolt's Rock contributes to the State significance of the Captain Thunderbolt Sites as the site of the first, and last, instances of highway robbery that Captain Thunderbolt attempted.

The place is important in demonstrating aesthetic characteristics and/or a high degree of creative or technical achievement in New South Wales.

Aesthetically Thunderbolt's Rock is of local significance as an impressive landmark on the road from Uralla to Tamworth.

The place has strong or special association with a particular community or cultural group in New South Wales for social, cultural or spiritual reasons.

Thunderbolt's Rock contributes to the State significance of the Captain Thunderbolt Sites as a site recognised by the public to be associated with Captain Thunderbolt. Captain Thunderbolt is one of the best known bushrangers who operated in New South Wales and forms a significant element to the construction of Australian identity. Thunderbolt's Rock site is well marked and is a popular tourist destination.

The place possesses uncommon, rare or endangered aspects of the cultural or natural history of New South Wales.

Thunderbolt's Rock is a documented historical site associated with roadside robberies committed by the 19th-century bushranger Captain Thunderbolt (Frederick Ward). The location is notable for its association with his activities along the Great Northern Road in New South Wales.

The place is important in demonstrating the principal characteristics of a class of cultural or natural places/environments in New South Wales.

Thunderbolt's Rock is of State significance as being representative of the type of places used by bushrangers to hold up coaches and travellers. Thunderbolt's Rock is an example of the type of place Captain Thunderbolt used for road side hold ups and which helped define these criminal activities as "bushranging" due to the men appearing out of the bush on horse back and then escaping into the bush with the proceeds of the robbery.

Thunderbolt's Rock is an identifiable location of a highway robbery. The majority of bushranging robberies took place at locations which cannot be verified.

== See also ==
- Blanch's Royal Oak Inn
- Captain Thunderbolt's Death Site
- Captain Thunderbolt's Grave
