= Suzanne McClelland (Miss Australia) =

Miss Australia 1969

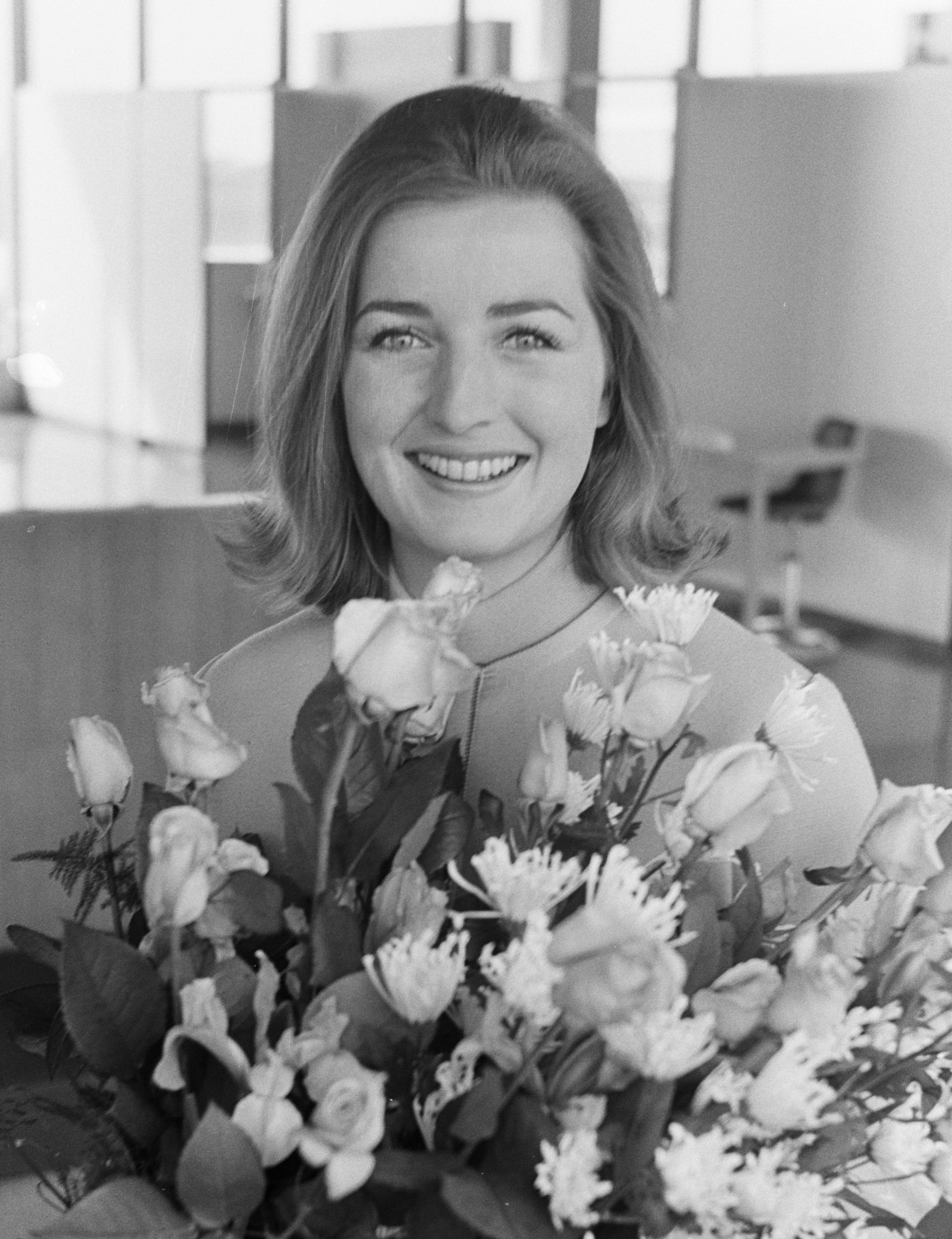
- Suzanne McClelland in the Netherlands in 1969
- Born: 1948 (age 76–77)

Suzanne McClelland (born 1948) was Miss Australia 1969.

McClelland was trained as a classical ballerina by Kathleen Gorham, but had to stop due to a foot injury.
