= Mary Ann Bugg =

Australian bushranger (1834–1905)

- Born: 7 May 1834; Berrico outstation, Gloucester, New South Wales, Australia
- Died: 22 April 1905 (aged 70); Mudgee, New South Wales, Australia
- Other name: Captain's Lady
- Occupations: Bushranger, scout, nurse
- Known for: Partnership with Captain Thunderbolt; bushranging and resistance
- Partner: Frederick Ward (Captain Thunderbolt)
- Children: At least 15, including Marina Emily Ward and Frederick Wordsworth Ward
- Parent(s): James Bugg and Charlotte (Worimi woman)

Mary Ann Bugg (7 May 1834 – 22 April 1905) was a Worimi bushranger, one of several well-documented women bushrangers in mid-19th century Australia. She was an expert horse rider and bush navigator who travelled with her bushranging partner and lover Captain Thunderbolt.

== Early years ==
Mary Ann Bugg was born at the Berrico outstation of the Australian Agricultural Company near Gloucester, New South Wales, on 7 May 1834. Her father, James Bugg, who was born in Essex, England in 1801, was convicted of stealing meat (two lambs, a wether sheep and two pigs) at the Essex Assizes, was held at Chelmsford in July 1825 and was sentenced to death. Reprieved to life transportation, he sailed on the convict transport Sesostris (incorrectly recorded as "James Brigg"), which reached Sydney on 21 March 1826. On 15 January 1827, he was assigned to the Australian Agricultural Company as a shepherd. Successful in his duties, he was promoted to overseer around 1829 and soon afterwards assigned to oversee the Company's outstation at Berrico. In 1834 he was granted a ticket-of-leave, which allowed him to work for himself so long as he remained in the district and attended a regular muster; he chose to continue working for the Company.

In 1833, Bugg established a relationship with an Aboriginal woman he called Charlotte, and from this union were born Mary Ann (1834), John (1836), Eliza (c. 1839), William (1841), James (1843), Jane (1845), Elizabeth (1847) and Thomas (1850). Mary Ann and her brother John were baptised by the Company's chaplain, Reverend William Macquarie Cowper, on 24 February 1839. The following day Bugg headed to Sydney with them, where they were to be educated. He and Charlotte had requested the Company's Commissioner, Colonel Henry Dumaresq, to find a school for them so as to "elevate them above the Barbarism of her Tribe". Dumaresq received approval to send them to the Orphan School at Parramatta, however they were not educated there. All that is known with certainty is that Mary Ann attended school somewhere in Sydney where she learnt literacy, numeracy, and domestic skills, before returning to Berrico when she was around ten years of age.

On 1 June 1848, less than a month after her fourteenth birthday, Mary Ann married a man named Edmund Baker at the Church of England in Stroud. Baker was almost certainly ex-convict Edward Baker, a Lady Harewell transportee (1831). They appear to have given birth to a daughter Helena, although this cannot be stated with certainty. Their relationship ended within a year or two of their marriage.

Bugg moved to the Bathurst district with her second partner, John Burrows, where they were living when gold was discovered at the Turon River in July 1851. A son James was born in 1851 and another son John in 1853; by the time her second son was baptised the couple had settled in the Mudgee district. By mid-1855, Bugg had left Burrows and was living with ex-soldier James McNally, to whom she bore another three children: Mary Jane (1856), Patrick Christopher (1857) and Ellen (1860). McNally was a farmer at Cooyal north of Mudgee, and it was there in 1860 that Bugg met ticket-of-leave convict Frederick Ward (later to become bushranger Captain Thunderbolt).

== Relationship with Fred Ward ==
Bugg became pregnant soon after meeting Frederick Ward (Captain Thunderbolt). Ward took Bugg back to her father's farm at Monkerai, near Dungog, for the baby's delivery, and their daughter Marina Emily was born late in 1861. In taking Mary Ann to Monkerai, however, Ward was in breach of the ticket-of-leave regulations which required him to remain in the Mudgee district and to attend three-monthly musters. As it turned out, he was late returning for the muster, and he compounded the problem by riding into town on a horse claimed by the owner to have been "stolen" (although the owner admitted during Ward's trial that the horse had simply gone missing and that he had heard that it had been seen near Cooyal but had not tried to retrieve it). Ward's ticket-of-leave was revoked, and he was returned to Cockatoo Island to serve the remaining six years of his previous ten-year sentence, along with an additional three years for being found in possession of a stolen horse.

Most Thunderbolt books claim that Bugg helped Ward escape from Cockatoo Island, one of the few successful escapes during the island's history as a penal settlement, however this is probably not correct. Mary Ann remained in the Dungog district where she was working to support herself and her two youngest children, even though some authors claim she found domestic work harbour-side in Sydney. The story is that she swam the shark-infested harbour, delivering a file for Ward to remove his leg irons and then used a lamp to guide him to a safe landing on the foreshore. However, it is most likely that Bugg did not meet up with Ward again until after his escape from Cockatoo Island in September 1863.

== Bushranging with Captain Thunderbolt ==
After the Rutherford toll-bar robbery, where "Captain Thunderbolt" first introduced himself, Ward returned to Dungog and collected Bugg and her two youngest daughters, Ellen and Marina. In February 1864 they travelled through the mountains west of Gloucester during what became known as the Great Flood of 1864, eventually ending up at the Culgoa River, north-west of Walgett, where Ward's brother William was working. They lived quietly for the remainder of the year, however early in 1865 Ward joined forces with three other miscreants and began to rob hawkers and stations in the north-western plains near Collarenebri. He eventually travelled extensively during his six-and-a-half years as a bushranger, robbing from Newcastle as far north as Queensland, and from Narrabri nearly as far west as Bourke.

In 1865, Bugg gave birth to another child, a daughter named Elizabeth Ann Ward, although she later left the child with friends or relations – as she had her two older daughters – so she could remain on the run with Ward. She was not only his lover but his eyes and ears, helping to keep him safe from the troopers. She acted as his scout, visiting towns to find out if the troopers were around, however there is no evidence to suggest that she accompanied him during his robberies although the community at large believed that she did. Primarily, she looked after their bush camps, hamstringing cattle and foraging for food for Ward and his accomplices. Several reports describe her as looking like a young man wearing knee-length, Wellington boots, moleskin trousers, a Crimean shirt, a Monkey jacket and a cabbage tree hat, the dress of the flash stockmen of the day (and at a time when women did not wear men's clothing). Also, she rode astride (as did a man) and not sidesaddle as was customary for women in those days. She was proud of her association with Ward and on several occasions referred to herself as the "Captain's Lady".

Bugg's involvement with the outlaw led to her apprehension by the police on three occasions. In 1866, she was sentenced to six months in gaol for vagrancy, however an outcry in Parliament led the Attorney General to examine the paperwork associated with her conviction and to recommend her release on the grounds that the charges had been poorly phrased and did not use the necessary terminology to convict her under the Vagrancy Act. Another conviction, in 1867, for being in possession of stolen goods was overturned when a concerned magistrate looked into her case and discovered that a shop assistant could identify her as having purchased some of the goods.

== Death ==
Most Thunderbolt books claim that Bugg died at the Goulburn River in November 1867, however this was a woman named Louisa Mason (alias Yellow Long), wife of Robert Michael Mason of Rouchel near Scone. Mary Ann fell pregnant again a few weeks after Louisa Mason's death, but she and Ward separated a short time later. Their son Frederick Wordsworth Ward was born at Carroll in August 1868. In the aftermath, Mary Ann settled again with John Burrows and had another four children who survived infancy: Ada Gertrude (1870), Ida Margaret (1874), George Herbert (1880). Burrows died prior to 1900 and Mary Ann found work as a nurse to support herself, before dying on 22 April 1905 at Mudgee. Her son Frederick took after his birth father, becoming a groom and later a horse-trainer; he died unmarried as Frederick Wordsworth Burrows in 1937.

== Representations in media ==
Natasha Wanganeen plays Bugg in Drunk History Australia, a 2020 Network 10 TV series.

“Maryanne Bugg” is the last of many hundreds of poems in Les Murray’s “Collected Poems” (third edition, Black Inc., 2018). Murray (d 2019) is considered one of the foremost poets in English of his time.

== See also ==
- List of Indigenous Australian historical figures
