= Captain Thunderbolt's Death Site =

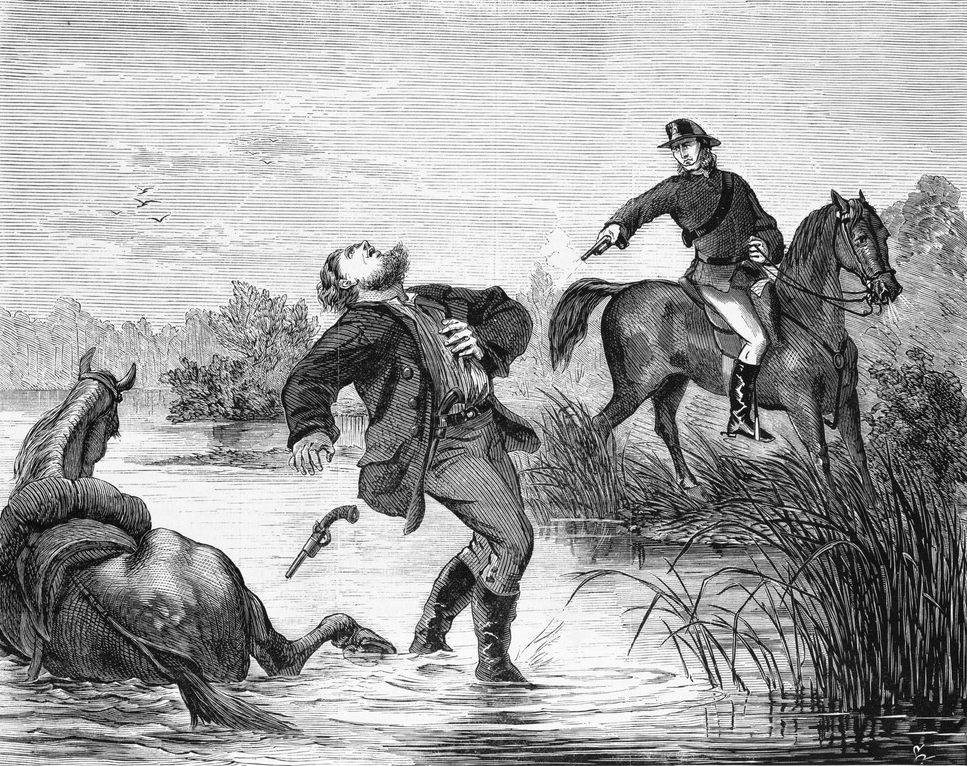
- Wood engraving of the death of Captain Thunderbolt, 1870.

- Location within New South Wales Location within Australia
- 30°41′14″S 151°26′52″E
- Location: Kentucky District, Uralla Shire, New South Wales, Australia

New South Wales Heritage Register
- Official name: The Captain Thunderbolt Sites – Thunderbolt's Death Site
- Type: State heritage (landscape)
- Designated: 20 July 2012
- Reference no.: 1889
- Type: Wetland or river
- Category: Landscape – Natural

Captain Thunderbolt's Death Site is a heritage-listed paddock in the Kentucky District, in the New England region of New South Wales, Australia. It is one of a group of historic sites labelled The Captain Thunderbolt Sites for their association with bushranger Captain Thunderbolt, along with Captain Thunderbolt's Rock, Blanch's Royal Oak Inn, and Captain Thunderbolt's Grave. Collectively, all properties were added to the New South Wales State Heritage Register on 20 July 2012.

== History ==
After the hawker, Giovanni Cappisotti, raised the alarm in Uralla regarding the events at Blanch's Inn on the afternoon of 25 May 1870, Senior Constable John Mulhall and Constable Alexander Walker rode south from Uralla. Mulhall had the better horse and reached the inn first. Walker was approximately half a mile away when he heard shots being fired and met Mulhall while ascending the hill towards the Inn.

Mulhall told Walker "I have exchanged shots with them" and took no further part in the chase as his horse was bolting. On reaching the top of the hill Walker saw two men on grey horses. The younger man appeared to herd the older away from the road forcing him to ride west along Blanch's fence.

Walker chased Thunderbolt to Kentucky Creek with shots exchanged on the way. Once he reached the creek Thunderbolt dismounted and waded across the creek. Walker caught up with his horse and shot it, preventing its further use for Thunderbolt's escape. Walker crossed the river and had to go about 91 metres (100 yd) to where Thunderbolt was, now back on the opposite side of the creek.

Walker galloped up to Thunderbolt until they were separated by a distance of 14 metres (15 yd).

"Surrender" ordered Walker. "Never, what is your name?" "Walker" was the Constable's reply. "Are you a trooper Walker?" "Yes." "A married man?" "Yes." "Remember you are a married man Walker" said Thunderbolt shaking his pistol. "Will you surrender?" "I will die first" Thunderbolt spat back, likely the hell that was Cockatoo Island forefront in his mind. "Then it's you or I for it." Walker rushed forward his horse stumbling in the water.

Ward rushed at the Constable, into the water, with his revolver raised. Walker fired, later the Armidale Medical Advisor to the government, Dr Spasshatt, would testify that the bullet had entered just below the left collar bone and exited "on the right side of the chest, seven point six centimetres (three inches) below and five point one centimetres (two inches) anterior to the lower point right shoulder blade". Thunderbolt rose up once more and was finally felled by a strike to the head from Walker's pistol. Walker thinking the other man to be dead drew him out of the water.

Walker returned to the Inn thinking the other man who had been seen with Thunderbolt was his accomplice. Once it was established that he was a victim of Thunderbolt's robbery, they set back out to reclaim the body. They were unsuccessful and it was not until daylight the following day that Walker accompanied by Senior Constable Mulhall, a man named Dwyer and Senior Constable Scott were able to retrieve the body and returned it to Blanch's Royal Oak Inn for the magisterial inquiry before being moved to Uralla.

Constable Walker received a promotion for his efforts and was also the recipient of half of the A£400 reward (the other half went to Cappisotti) for the capture of Thunderbolt. Walker had a meritorious career in the police rising to the rank of Superintendent in 1896. He served in that capacity in the Deniliquin, Albury and Goulburn districts. In 1907 he also acted as Inspector-General of Police for a period of three months. Walker died at his home in Cremorne on 30 April 1929, he was 81 years old.

It has been reported that after Ned Kelly's raid on Jerilderie in 1879 the help of the then Senior Sergeant Walker was sought by the Victorian Police to catch Kelly. Kelly disappeared before Walker could cross the Murray and he took no further part in the search. On 24 May 1970 a memorial to Constable Walker was unveiled in Uralla to celebrate the centenary of Thunderbolt's death the inscription reads:

THUNDERBOLT CENTENARY 1870–1970
ALEXANDER BINNING WALKER
This plaque commemorating the bravery of Const. A. B. Walker was unveiled by T. W. Allan, Police Commissioner on 24 May 1970.

== Description ==
The site of Thunderbolt's death is near to where the Kentucky Creek turns from running north–south to east–west; the creek is surrounded by pasture.

=== Condition ===
As at 10 April 2012, the site is intact and is unlikely to have archaeological potential.

=== Modifications and dates ===
Thunderbolt's actual death site is now submerged as the Kentucky Creek dam was constructed downstream of the site in the 1960s.

=== Further information ===
The broad location of Captain Thunderbolt's Death Site has been identified based on the police report submitted by Constable Alexander Binning Walker after his shooting of Thunderbolt. Different secondary sources stat that the actual death site was either in the north–south running section of the creek or the east–west section. Insufficient evidence is available to resolve this matter. The adjacent landowner had previously provided access for visitors to Thunderbolt's Death Site, however this has stopped due to the amount of rubbish being left in the paddocks.

== Heritage listing ==
As at 10 April 2012, Captain Thunderbolt's Death Site is significant as the last stand of this bushranger. The site contributes to the State significance of the Captain Thunderbolt Sites through its associations with Captain Thunderbolt.

The Captain Thunderbolt Sites – Thunderbolt's Death Site was listed on the New South Wales State Heritage Register on 20 July 2012 having satisfied the following criteria.

The place has a strong or special association with a person, or group of persons, of importance of cultural or natural history of New South Wales's history.

Captain Thunderbolt's Death Site contributes to the State significance of the Captain Thunderbolt Sites through its intimate associations with the Captain Thunderbolt story. The site is also significant for its associations with Constable Alexander Binning Walker who was promoted after the shooting of Thunderbolt, eventually rising to the rank of Superintendent in the NSW Police Force.

The place has a strong or special association with a particular community or cultural group in New South Wales for social, cultural or spiritual reasons.

Captain Thunderbolt's Death Site contributes to the State significance of The Captain Thunderbolt Sites for its associations with Captain Thunderbolt and the place he holds in the public's imagination and consciousness. Thunderbolt is a well known bushranger, who operated in New South Wales and his history plays a significant part in the construction of the Australian identity. With the rise in nationalist sentiment leading up to Federation, colonists and early Australians were eager to present the country as a young and respectable nation. This period lead to the ongoing romanticisation of the bushrangers, and in particular Captain Thunderbolt. Death sites of cultural legends like Captain Thunderbolt have high value to a range of people.

The place possesses uncommon, rare or endangered aspects of the cultural or natural history of New South Wales.

Captain Thunderbolt 's Death Site is rare as a well-documented site of a bushranger's death in the bush. The large majority of NSW bushrangers were killed in sieges in buildings; were hanged in Darlinghurst Gaol, or died under more ordinary circumstances.

== See also ==
- Captain Thunderbolt's Rock
- Blanch's Royal Oak Inn
- Captain Thunderbolt's Grave
