= Rosemary Edna Sinclair =

Australian environmentalist (born 1936)

Rosemary Sinclair
- Born: Rosemary Edna Fenton; 17 November 1936 (age 90); Lord Howe Island, New South Wales, Australia
- Occupations: Environmental and children's rights activist
- Known for: Miss Australia 1960
- Spouse: Ian Sinclair (m. 1970)
- Children: 4 (including 3 stepchildren)

Rosemary Edna Sinclair AO (née Fenton; born 17 November 1936) is an Australian activist and beauty pageant titleholder. She is involved in administrative approach related to developmental actions. She won the title of Miss Australia in 1960.

In November 1988, in association with Christine Stewart, she founded the National Association for the Prevention of Child Abuse and Neglect (NAPCAN) to fully address issues related to child abuse.

== Early life and education ==
Rosemary Edna Fenton was born on Lord Howe Island on 17 November 1936. Her father, Stanley Fenton, worked as a radio operator at the Civil Aviation Department on the island. Her schooling until matriculation was at the Presbyterian Ladies' College, Sydney, a boarding school. She also did a course in nursing. When her mother died in 1952, she returned to Lord Howe Island to look after her father and two younger siblings, brother Stan and sister Robyn. While she had left the island to attend secondary school, she used to come home twice a year. Her paintings adorned the walls of her father's house.

Sinclair wanted to compete for the Miss Australia beauty contest. As she lived on the island keeping house for her family, she stitched her own clothes on the basis of a catalog she had obtained from Sydney. She tried these clothes on her younger 12- year old sister Robyn as a model. She won the Miss Australia title in November 1960 and was very modest about winning the crown. She then went on a prize-winning tour of Hong Kong, Tokyo, Honolulu, San Francisco, and many other places. Thereafter, she worked as a model.

== Career ==
Sinclair took up the environmental cause of her birthplace, the Lord Howe Island, in 1982, when it was listed as an UNESCO World Heritage Site. Though the islanders were pleased with the heritage status accorded to the island, Sinclair was unhappy with many of the planning and management actions initiated by the Government of Australia to conserve the newly accorded heritage status, as it affected the basic rights of the islanders. Her objections were to the cutting of pine trees planted in the 19th century; she considered these trees (though not indigenous) as part of the island's heritage.

When the trees were being felled she threatened to lie down between the trees to stop the tree cutters. Her argument was that the trees added to the aesthetic beauty of the island. She also objected to the neglect of maintenance of embankments that were built to extend the airport on the island, as the embankments were eroding. She objected to the garbage that was being dumped in the lagoon of the island as it was causing health hazards.

The management plan proposed by the government to preserve the island's heritage status envisaged restricting the tourist accommodation to about 400 and limiting the number of cars on the island to 100, which she objected for the reason that it was limiting the opportunities to the islanders who had lived there for many years. Another of her protests was on the creation of an aquatic reserve in a part of the island. She considered this action as detrimental to the fishing rights of the local people who had fished in the area for several years. All her objections resulted in the Ministry of Planning and Environment agreeing to address the issues she had raised. In 1967, she worked in the Prime Minister's Department and dealt with public relations and facilitated the Montreal Expo.

== Awards and recognition ==
Sinclair was awarded the Centenary Medal in 2001 for "service to children, especially child abuse and neglect". She was made an Officer of the Order of Australia (AO) in the 2002 Australia Day Honours for "service as a leading advocate for the welfare of abused and neglected children, particularly through raising public awareness, developing preventative strategies, education programmes and support services for the parents of 'at risk' children, and through fundraising endeavours to maintain and expand services".

== Affiliations and memberships ==
In 1976, Sinclair took up the cause of child abuse and since then she has pursued the issue with dedication, even though she has been criticized for not raising the issues related to women in general outside the limits of the house. On child abuse her refrain is: "But there are no political boundaries for child abuse. It knows no socio-economic boundaries, either. There is an increasing community awareness of its cost to children and to society as a whole – and that something can be done."

== Personal life ==
She married Ian Sinclair on Valentine's Day 1970; he later became the Deputy leader of the Federal opposition and leader of the National Party of Australia. She was Ian's second wife and "inherited" his first wife's three children aged 8 to 12. In 1972, she and Ian Sinclair had a son, Andrew.
