= Miss Australia =

Australian beauty pageant

- Formation: 1908–2000
- Type: Beauty pageant
- Headquarters: Sydney
- Location: Australia
- Official language: English

Miss Australia was an Australian beauty pageant held from 1908 until 2000. It was replaced by Miss World Australia from 2002. From 1926 to 1992 the program operated as the Miss Australia Quest, after which the name was changed to the Miss Australia Awards.

From 1954, the contest was associated with the Spastic Centres of Australia. The winner of Miss Australia raised money for the centres through her family and friends, raising money for children and adults with cerebral palsy. The Miss Australia Quest was sponsored and organised from 1954 until the early 1960s by the lingerie manufacturer, Hickory, until Dowd Associates transferred ownership to the Australian Cerebral Palsy Association in 1963.

The pearl-encrusted Miss Australia crown was worn by titleholders from 1965 to 1991. The crown was hand-crafted in silver and blue velvet, and decorated with more than 800 pearls. Designed by Melbourne artist Ernest Booth and manufactured in Japan, the crown was presented to the Miss Australia Quest in 1965 by Toyomoto Australia Pty Ltd. The crown was last used in 1991, and is held at the National Museum of Australia.

== History ==
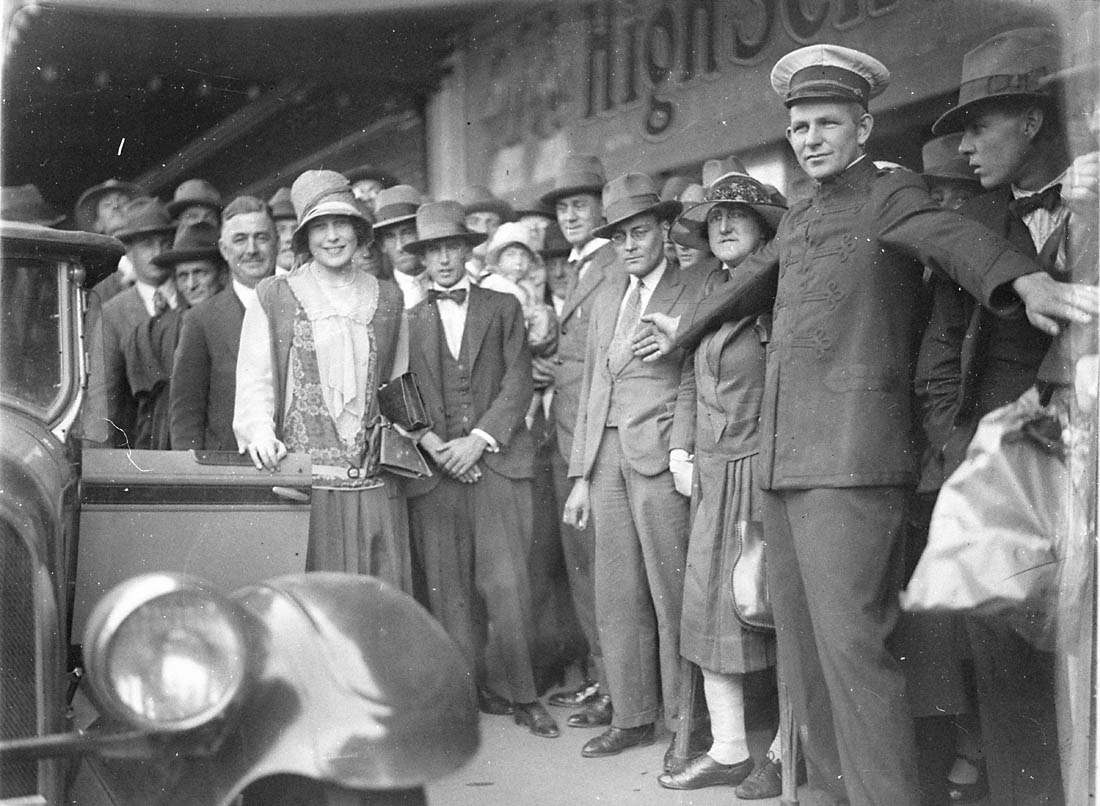
"Miss Australia", Beryl Mills in Sydney, by Sam Hood

The first Miss Australia contest was held in 1908 as a one-off event sponsored through the Lone Hand, with entrants from New South Wales, Victoria and Queensland. The winner was Alice Buckridge from Victoria. The primary purpose of the contest was "to attract customers: whether they were newspaper readers, patrons at an amusement venue or visitors to a country fair" (Saunders and Ustinoff, 2005:4)

The Miss Australia contests of 1926 and 1927 were sponsored by Smith's Weekly magazine and Union Theatres, with heats from each State, and were straightforward beauty contests, judged by an anonymous panel from the staff of the magazine and associated publications. Miss Australia 1937 was again sponsored by Smith's Weekly and again had heats in each State, but judging criteria were far broader, and the judging panel comprised prominent women. The prizes for the first two centred around screen tests and an escorted trip to the movie capitals of America. The 1937 prize was a chaperoned first-class travel world tour which included London for the Coronation season. Smith's Weekly was not involved in later Quests.

In 1953, the contest was revised by Bernard J. Dowd to promote the American Hickory lingerie that he marketed in Australia. A panel of Hickory-appointed judges in each state selected a winner based on photos sent it by young women, and then a national panel of Hickory-appointed judges chose the winner, Miss Australia.

In 1954, Colin Clay of the Queensland Spastic Welfare League asked Hickory if the Miss Australia competition could be used as a fundraiser for the league. Hickory agreed and from then on the contestants raised money for the league. Each state branch of the league would conduct its own contest to find a state winner, known as Miss Queensland, Miss New South Wales, etc, based on traditional "beauty contest" critieria. They would also award Miss Queensland Charity Queen, Miss New South Wales Charity Queensland, etc to the young woman who raised the most money in each state. The state finalists would then compete in the national competition for Miss Australia and Miss Australia Charity Queen.

In 1963, Dowd assigned all rights to the contest to the League.

== Titleholders ==
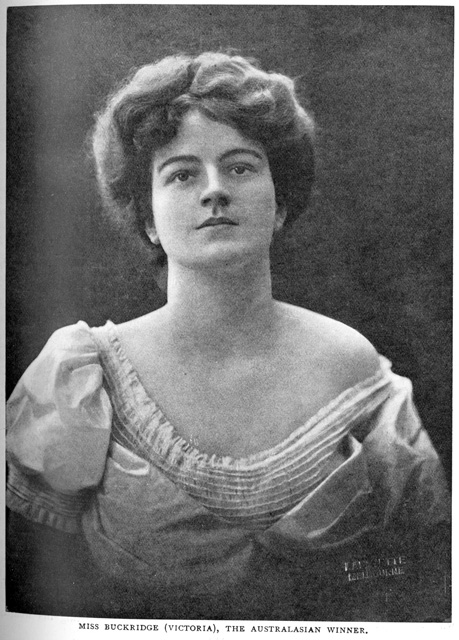
Alice Buckridge, Miss Australia 1908, in The Lone Hand magazine

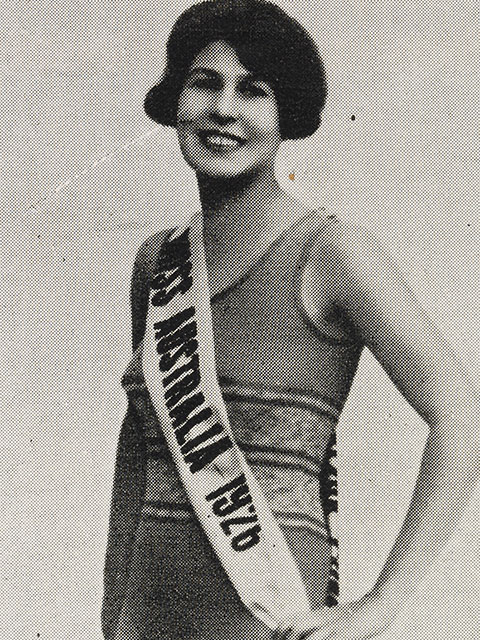
Beryl Mills, Miss Australia 1926

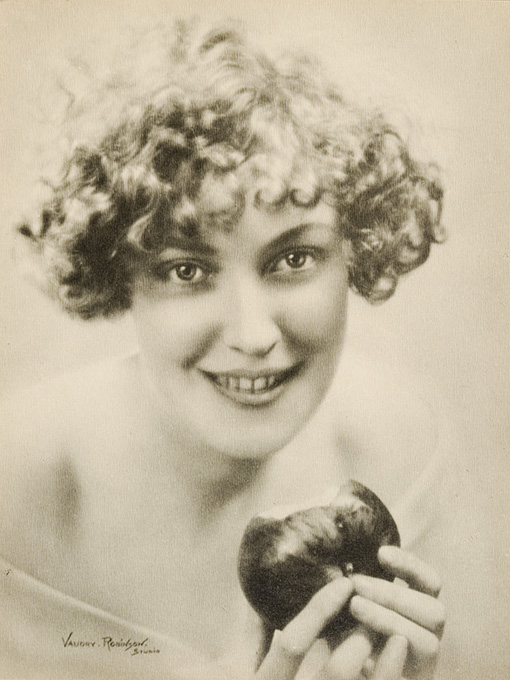
Phyllis Von Alwyn, Miss Australia 1927

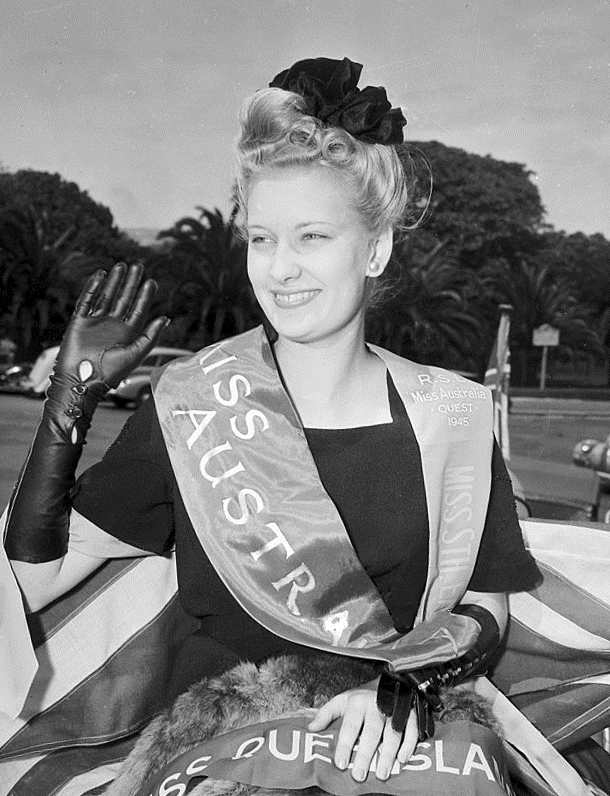
Rhonda Kelly in 1945

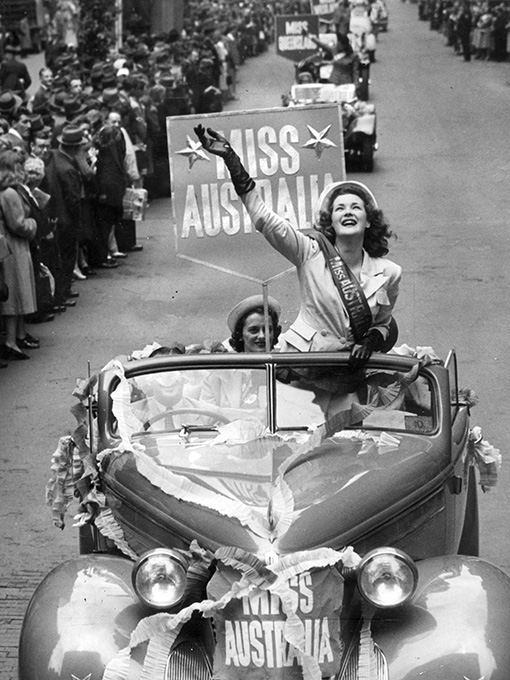
Judy Gainford, Miss Australia 1947

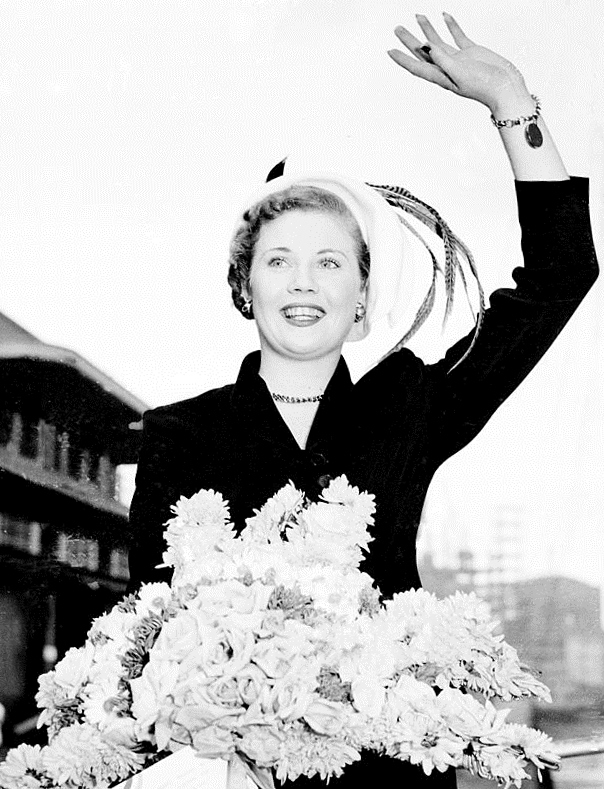
Margaret Hughes, Miss Australia 1949, in 1950

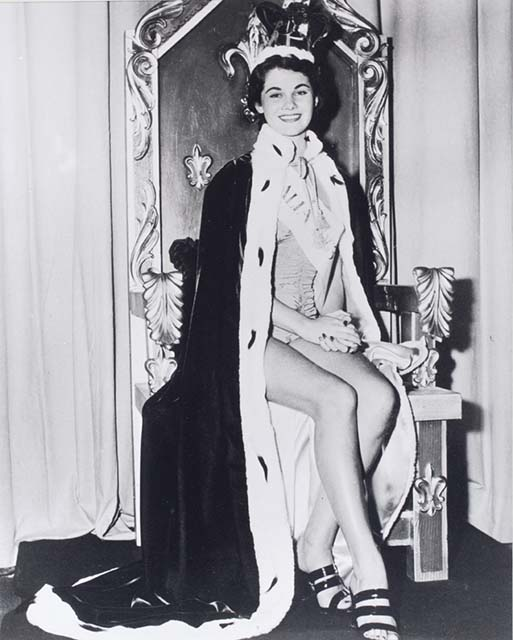
Maxine Morgan, Miss Australia 1953

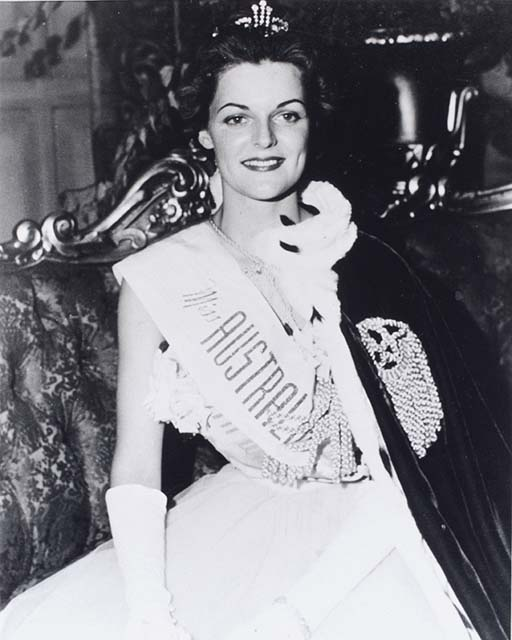
Shirley Bliss, Miss Australia 1954

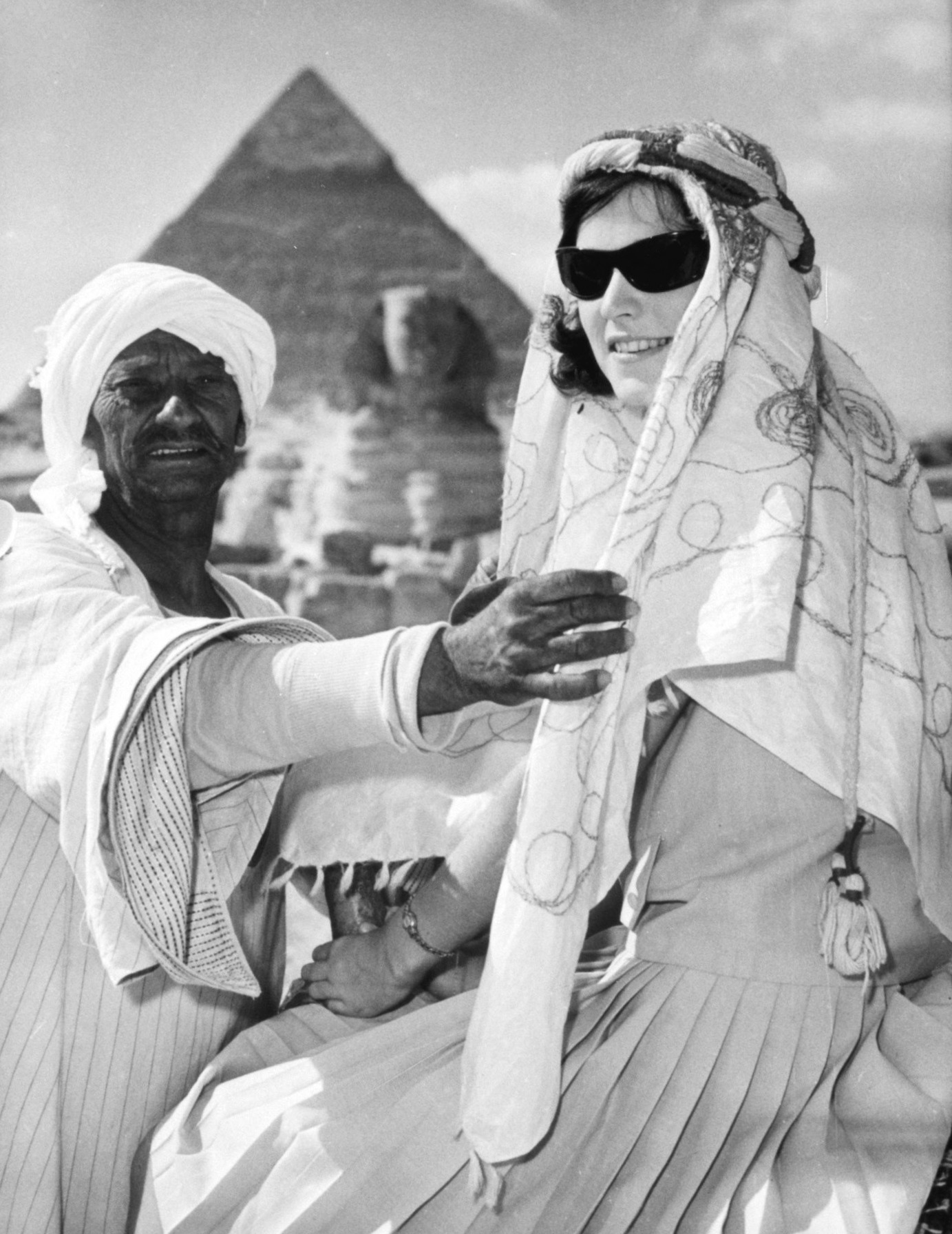
Jan Taylor, Miss Australia 1964 in Egypt

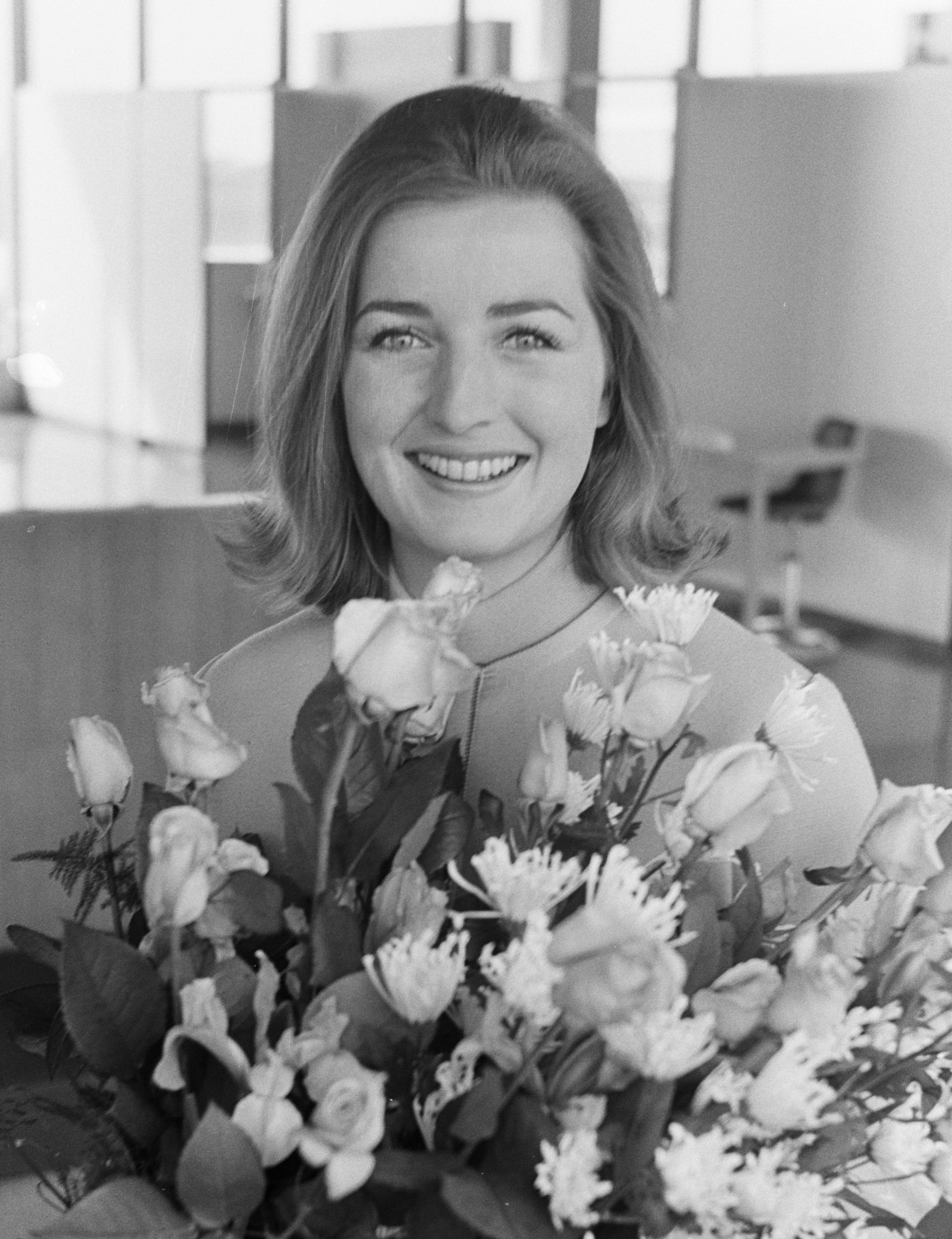
Suzanne McClelland, Miss Australia 1969 in the Netherlands

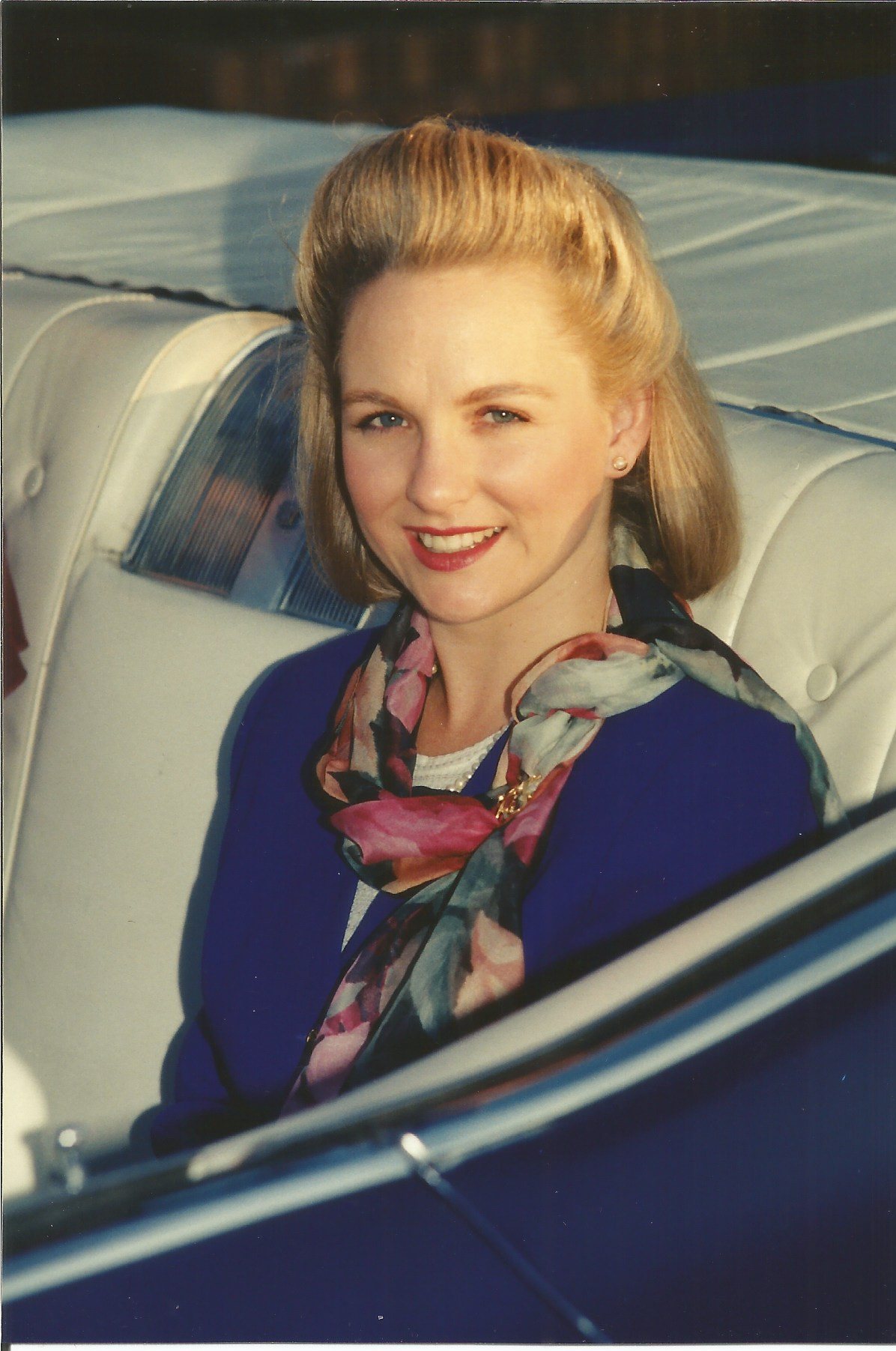
Miss Australia 1994 Jayne Bargwanna

- 1908 – Alice Buckridge
- 1926 – Beryl Mills of Geraldton, Western Australia
- 1927 – Phyllis Von Alwyn of Launceston, Tasmania
- 1937 – Sheila Martin of Wagga Wagga, New South Wales
- 1946 – Rhonda Kelly
- 1947 – Judith "Judy" Gainford
- 1948 – Beryl James
- 1949 – Margaret Hughes
- 1950 – Patricia "Pat" Woodley
- 1952 – Leah McCartney
- 1953 – Maxine Morgan
- 1954 – Shirley Bliss
- 1955 – Maureen Kistle
- 1956 – June Finlayson
- 1957 – Helen Wood
- 1958 – Pamela "Pam" McKay
- 1959 – Joan Stanbury
- 1960 – Rosemary Fenton
- 1961 – Tania Verstak
- 1962 – Tricia Reschke (Note: A newly arrived elephant at the Perth Zoo, was named after her in 1963.)
- 1964 – Jan Taylor
- 1965 – Carole Jackson
- 1966 – Sue Gallie
- 1967 – Margaret Rohan
- 1968 – Helen Newton
- 1969 – Suzanne McClelland
- 1970 – Rhonda Iffland
- 1971 – June Wright
- 1972 – Gay Walker
- 1973 – Michelle Downes
- 1974 – Randy Baker
- 1975 – Kerry Doyle
- 1976 – Sharon Betty
- 1977 – Francene Maras
- 1978 – Gloria Krope
- 1979 – Anne Sneddon
- 1980 – Eleanor Morton
- 1981 – Leanne Dick
- 1982 – Jenny Coupland
- 1983 – Lisa Cornelius
- 1984 – Mary-Ann Koznjak
- 1985 – Maria Ridley
- 1986 – Tracey Pearson
- 1987 – Judi Green
- 1988 – Caroline Lumley
- 1989 – Lea Dickson
- 1990 – Rebecca Noble
- 1991 – Helena Wayth
- 1992 – Suzanne Lee
- 1993 – Joanne Dick
- 1994 – Jane Bargwanna
- 1995 – Margaret Tierney
- 1996 – Suzanne Haward
- 1997 – Tracy Secombe
- 1998 – Suellen Fuller
- 1999 – Kathryn Hay
- 2000 – Sheree Primer

== Miss Australia at International pageants ==
Australia is now represented by either Miss Universe Australia or Miss World Australia:

- 1952 – Leah MacCartney
- 1953 – Maxine Morgan (4th RU)
- 1954 – Shirley Bliss
- 1955 – no (Universe), Beverly Prowse (World Miss – semi-finalist)
- 1956 – no (Universe)
- 1957 – no (Universe), June Finlayson (Miss World)
- 1958 – Astrid Tanda Lindholm
- 1959 – no (Universe)
- 1960 – no (Universe)
- 1961 – no (Universe)
- 1962 – no (Universe)
- 1963 – no (Universe)
- 1964 – Maria Luyben
- 1965 – Pauline Verey (Miss Universe – semi-finalist), Jan Rennison (Miss World)
- 1966 – no (Universe)
- 1967 – no (Universe), Judy Lockey (Miss World)
- 1968 – Lauren Jones (Miss Universe), Penelope Plummer (Miss World 1968)
- 1969 – Joanne Barret (Miss Universe 2nd RU), Stefane Meurer (Miss World)
- 1970 – Joan Lydia Zealand (Miss Universe-2nd RU), Valli Kemp (Miss World-Semi-finalist)
- 1971 – Tony Suzanne Rayward (Miss Universe-1st RU), Valerie Roberts (Miss World-Semi-finalist)
- 1972 – Kerry Anne Wells (Miss Universe 1972), Belinda Green (Miss World 1972)
- 1973 – Susan Mainwaring (Miss Universe), Virginia Radinas (World)
- 1974 – Yasmin May Nagy (Miss Universe-Semi-finalist), Gail Margaret Petith (World-3rd RU)
- 1975 – Jennifer Matthews(Miss Universe), Anne Davidson (World-Semi-finalist)
- 1976 – Julie Anne Ismay (Miss Universe-4th RU), Karen Jo Pini (Miss World-1st RU)
- 1977 – Jill Maree Minahan(Miss Universe), Jaye-Leanne Hopewell (Miss World – finalist)
- 1978 – Beverly Frances Pinder (Miss Universe), Denise Ellen Coward (Miss World – 2nd RU)
- 1979 – Kerry Dunderdale (Miss Universe), Jodie Anne Day (Miss World – 3rd RU)
- 1980 – Katrina Judith Rose Redina (Miss Universe), Linda Leigh Shepherd (Miss World)
- 1981 – Karen Sang (Miss Universe Australia), Melissa Hannan (Miss World – finalist & Queen of Oceania)
- 1982 – Lou-Anne Caroline Ronchi(Miss Universe & Miss International – semi-finalist), Catherine Anne Morris (Miss World – semi-finalist & Queen of Oceania)
- 1983 – Simone Cox (Universe), Tanya Bowe (Miss World, Queen of Oceania)
- 1984 – Donna Thelma Rudrum (Miss Universe), Lou-Anne Caroline Ronchi(Miss World – 2nd RU)
- 1985 – Elizabeth Rowly (Miss Universe), Angelina Nasso (Miss World)
- 1986 – Lucinda Bucat (Miss Universe & Miss International 86), Stephanie Eleanor Andrews (Miss World)
- 1987 – Jennine Susan Leonarder(Miss Universe), Vanessa Gibson (Miss International – semi-finalist), Donna Thelma Rudrum (Miss World)
- 1988 – Vanessa Gibson (Miss Universe), Catherine Bushell (Miss World – Semi-finalist & Queen of Oceania)
- 1989 – Karen Wenden (Miss Universe, Miss Photogenic), Natalie McCurry (Semi-finalist & Queen of Oceania)
- 1990 – Charmaine Ware (Miss Universe), Karina Brown (Miss World)
- 1991 – no (Universe), Leanne Buckle (Miss World-1st RU & Queen of Oceania)
- 1992 – Georgina Denahy (Miss Universe-Semi-finalist), Rebecca Simic (Miss World)
- 1993 – Voni Delfos (Miss Universe-finalist) Karen Ann Carwin (Miss World)
- 1994 – Michelle van Eimeren (Miss Universe), Skye Edwards (Miss World)
- 1995 – Jacqueline Shooter (Miss Universe), Melissa Porter (Miss World – semi-finalist)
- 1996 – Jodie McMullen (Miss Universe), Nicole Smith (Miss World)
- 1997 – Laura Csortan (Miss Universe-, Miss Amity & Miss world – semi-finalist)
- 1998 – Renee Henderson (Miss Universe), Sarah Jane St.Clair (Miss World)
- 1999 – Michelle Shead (Miss Universe), Kathryn Hay (Miss World)
- 2000 – Samantha Frost (Miss Universe), Renee Henderson (Miss World)
- 2001 – no (Miss Universe), Eva Milic (Miss World), Christy Anderson (Miss Earth)
- 2002 – Sarah Davies (Miss Universe), Nicole Gazal (Miss Australia World – semi-finalist), Ineke Candice Leffers (Miss Earth)
- 2003 – Ashlea Talbot (Miss Universe), Olivia Stratton (Miss Australia World – winner; Miss World People's Choice), Shivaune Christina Field(Miss Earth)
- 2004 – Jennifer Hawkins (Miss Universe 2004), Sarah Davies (Miss Australia World – semi-finalist), Alethea Lindsay (Miss World Australia runner up), Shenevelle Dickson (Miss Earth – finalist)
- 2005 – Michelle Guy (Miss Universe), Alethea Lindsay (Miss Universe Australia runner up), Denae Brunow (Miss Australia World), Ann Maree Bowdler (Miss Earth)
- 2006 – Erin McNaught (Miss Universe), Sabrina Houssami (Miss Australia World – 2nd runner up, Miss Asia Pacific World), Victoria Winter (Miss Earth)
- 2007 – Kimberley Busteed (Miss Universe), Caroline Pemberton (Miss Australia World), Victoria Stewart (Miss Earth)
- 2008 – Laura Dundovic (Miss Universe- top 10 finalist), Katie Richardson (Miss Australia World), Rachael Smith (Miss Earth),
- 2009 – Rachael Finch (Universe – 3rd runner up), Sophie Lavers (Miss Australia World – Miss World Talent 2009 3rd runner up)
- 2010 – Jesinta Franklin (Universe – 2nd Runner up), Ashleigh Francis (Miss Australia World)
- 2011 – Scherri-Lee Biggs (Universe – top 10 finalists), Amber Greasley (Miss World Australia – Miss World quarter finalist)
- 2012 – Renae Ayris (Universe – 3rd Runner up), Jessica Kahawaty (Miss Australia World – Miss World 2nd runner up)
- 2013 – Olivia Wells (Miss Universe), Erin Holland (Miss World Australia – Miss World Oceania), Kelly Louise Maguire (Miss Grand Australia- Miss Grand International 4th runner up).
- 2014 – Tegan Martin, (Universe – top 10 finalists); Courtney Thorpe (Miss World Australia – Miss World Oceania – top 5); Renera Thompson (Miss Grand Australia- Miss Grand International 3rd runner up).
- 2015 – Monika Radulovic, (Universe – top 5 finalists); Tess Alexander (Miss World Australia – Miss World Oceania – top 11); Claire Elizabeth Parker (Miss Grand Australia- Miss Grand International Winner).
- 2016 – Caris Tiivel (Miss Universe), Madeline Cowe (Miss World Australia – Top 20); Dani Fitch (Miss Grand Australia- Miss Grand International Top 20 finalist)

=== Australia at Miss Global ===
Color keys

- : Declared as Winner
- : Ended as runner-up or top 5/6 qualification
- : Ended as one of the finalists or semifinalists
- : Ended as special awards winner

Year	Miss Global Australia	National title	Placement at Miss Global	Special Awards
2022	Brooke Rankin	Miss Global Australia 2022	2nd Runner-Up	
2021	Denika Donnelly	Miss Global Australia 2021	No	
2019	Mikaela-Rose Fowler	Miss Global Australia 2019	4th Runner-Up	
2018	Rachel Falzon	Miss Global Australia 2018	Top 11	
2017	Sophia Harris	Miss Global Australia 2017	Top 11	
2016	Caitlynn Henry	Miss Global Australia 2016	2nd Runner-Up	
2015	Jessica Peart	Miss Global Australia 2015	Miss Global 2015	
2014	Elise Natalie Duncan	Miss Global Australia 2014	1st Runner-Up	Miss Fitness
2013	Emily Rogers	Miss Global Australia 2013	Top 10	Miss Fitness

== Exhibition ==
In 2007, a National Museum of Australia exhibition, Miss Australia: A Nation's Quest, told the stories of titleholders, volunteers, fundraisers and sponsors involved in the Miss Australia Quest. Historic dresses, trophies and crowns were also included in the exhibition.

== See also ==
- Miss World Australia
- Miss Universe Australia
- Miss Grand Australia
- Miss International Australia
- Miss Earth Australia
- Beryl Mills
- Daphne Campbell
