= Eucalyptus × laseronii =

Scientific classification
- Kingdom: Plantae
- Clade: Tracheophytes
- Clade: Angiosperms
- Clade: Eudicots
- Clade: Rosids
- Order: Myrtales
- Family: Myrtaceae
- Genus: Eucalyptus
- Species: E. × laseronii

Binomial name
- Eucalyptus × laseronii R.T.Baker

Synonyms
- Eucalyptus × laseroni R.T.Baker orth. var.

Species of eucalyptus

Eucalyptus × laseronii is a species of small tree that is endemic to a restricted area of New South Wales. It has rough fibrous bark on its trunk smooth bark that is shed in long strips above, lance-shaped leaves, flower buds with a pointed, conical operculum and hemispherical fruit. It is considered to be a natural hybrid between E. caliginosa and E. stellulata. It was first described in 1913 from a specimen collected from Black Mountain near Guyra by "Mr. Laseron".
