= Wandsworth (disambiguation) =

Wandsworth is a district in south London, England.

Wandsworth can also refer to:

- London Borough of Wandsworth, London, established 1965
- Wandsworth (electoral division), former Greater London Council electoral division, existed from 1965 to 1973
- Wandsworth (London County Council constituency), existed from 1889 to 1919
- Wandsworth (UK Parliament constituency), existed from 1885 to 1918
- Metropolitan Borough of Wandsworth, London, existed from 1900 to 1965
- Wandsworth District (Metropolis), London, existed from 1855 to 1900
- Wandsworth, New South Wales, Australia
- Wandsworth, Newfoundland and Labrador, Canada
- HM Prison Wandsworth, London
- Wandsworth Common (ward)
- Wandsworth Town (ward)
