= Commercial Bank of Australia Building, Armidale =

CBA Bank
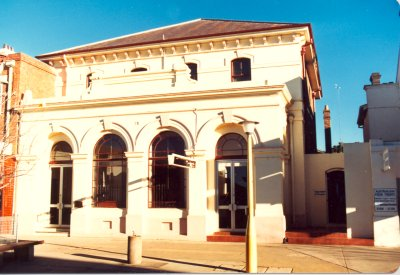
- Bank building, 1985

- Location within New South Wales Location within Australia
- 30.5138°S 151.6666°E
- Location: 164 Beardy Street, Armidale, Armidale Regional Council, New South Wales, Australia

History
- Built: 1882–1885

Site notes
- Architect(s): NSW Colonial Architect's Office (Barnet and Vernon)
- Owner: Joe Barbato Pty Ltd

New South Wales Heritage Register
- Official name: CBA Bank (former); CBA Bank; Comfort Lodge; Former Commonwealth Bank
- Type: state heritage (built)
- Designated: 2 April 1999
- Reference no.: 433
- Type: Telegraph Station
- Category: Postal and Telecommunications
- Builders: C.T. Cook

The Commercial Bank of Australia Building is a heritage-listed former telegraph office and bank and now commercial premises at 164 Beardy Street, Armidale, in the New England region of New South Wales, Australia. It was designed by NSW Colonial Architect's Office (Barnet and Vernon) and built from 1882 to 1885 by C.T. Cook. It is also known as Comfort Lodge. The property is owned by Joe Barbato Pty Ltd (Private). It was added to the New South Wales State Heritage Register on 2 April 1999.

== History ==
=== Background history ===
The former CBA Bank was built for the Land Board Office in the early 1880s, designed by the Colonial Architect, James Barnet. According to a historical reference the building was begun in 1882 and finished 1885, built by C.T. Cook (Heritage Office File). In the middle or late 1880s the building housed the Telegraph Office. The telegraph master in 1889 was Robert W. Arnott. He was also "Money Order and Government Savings Bank Agent" (Heritage Office File).

In those days a telegraph master or post master was expected to reside as well as work in their office. It is likely that the subject building was used as a residence. By the 1890s the telegraph office functions were apparently combined with the post office and moved into the Armidale Post Office building adjacent. The subject building then housed other government offices.

It has been said that under the direction of Walter Liberty Vernon Government Architect 1890–1911, the single storey portico was added, to match the portico on the post office which was adjacent; but this has not been verified (Heritage Office File). Stylistically the Telegraph Office (former CBA building) loggia is in harmony and well integrated with its own facade design.

The Armidale Post Office loggia was added in 1897 designed by Vernon (Heritage Office File). In the early 20th century the Post Office loggia was extended again, reaching closer to the former telegraph office. Although it has not been confirmed exactly which building copied which, it is certain that through much of their early history the two buildings were linked in their function and form.

=== Change of use and modifications ===
In 1918 the building was sold to the then State Savings Bank which was taken over by the Commercial Bank of Australia in 1932 (Heritage Office File). Modifications occurred during the late 1930s such as the enclosure of the portico openings. A 1936 photograph shows two chimneys (no longer extant) positioned on either side of the centre of the roof.

By 1985 the building had been unoccupied for several years. A new owner proposed to remove the fenestration from the arched portico opening thereby restoring its earlier arcaded appearance. Whilst this was strongly supported from a heritage viewpoint, it was felt that these and future alterations should be carried out under the guidance of the Heritage Council. This led to the Interim Conservation Order in September 1985, followed by the Permanent Conservation Order being placed on the building 21 March 1986, signed by Bob Carr, the then Minister for Planning and Environment. In 1986, the glazing to the portico arches was removed and the original openings were restored, with timber shop fronts being installed. Retail shops have occupied the building since that time. Aluminium and glass projecting shop windows were installed under the arcade in 1991.

The building suffered hail damage to its slate tiles in 1996, resulting in parts of the roof being replaced. It was repainted in 2005.

== Description ==
The former Commercial Bank of Australia Building is situated on Beardy Street, a main street of Armidale which has been closed to traffic creating a pedestrian mall. The building fronts onto the footpath with no setback.

The building is a two-storey brick building, rendered and painted on the street side only. The facade is symmetrical and the street level portico has four round arches. A decorative central parapet with scrolled edges rises above the portico, and the upper storey has four segmental-arch openings with double hung sash windows. The slate roof has been described as hipped (Heritage Office File); photographs seem to indicate that it may even be pyramidal.

=== Style ===
The facade bears elements of the Victorian Italianate style as defined in Identifying Australian Architecture: stuccoed facade, segmental arch window openings, arcaded loggia, and bracketed eaves. A pyramidal roof is another feature which typically appears on some Italianate buildings, usually on tower features. James Barnet built many regional New South Wales post offices and government buildings in the Italianate style.

=== Materials and modifications ===
External decoration, on the facade only, includes rendered masonry bracket supports to the eaves, rendered string courses, label moulds, and keystones over the arches . The rear and side walls contrast with the street facade. They are brown brick with red-brown brick lintels over the flat-arch openings. Stone lintels are evident on the lower storey windows to the rear of the building. The roof is slate, and has been repaired and elements replaced over the years, with the ridge cappings having been replaced several times. No chimneys are evident. The interior has been altered with fireplaces removed.

Adjoining the rear of the main building is a single storey brick building which is square in plan. Its construction date is unknown. The smaller building has a corrugated iron roof which features small ventilation gables at its apex and a tall brick chimney. Application to replace the roof was received in 1997.

== Heritage listing ==
The former CBA Bank (former Telegraph Office) is a significant element in one of the finest groups of civic buildings in New South Wales. The building is prominently located in the Beardy Street pedestrian mall, in part of the Armidale Conservation Area as identified by the National Trust. Its arcaded portico complements the arcade on the adjacent Armidale Post Office (158-160 Beardy Street). Together these buildings provide historic and aesthetic streetscape elements of importance to the people of Armidale (Heritage Office file). The building has historic significance as an example of the work of James Barnet, Colonial Architect, and as a link in the telegraph communications network established by the state in the second half of the 19th century.

CBA Bank was listed on the New South Wales State Heritage Register on 2 April 1999 having satisfied the following criteria.

The place is important in demonstrating the course, or pattern, of cultural or natural history in New South Wales.

The former CBA Bank is associated with the historical development of Armidale's civic core. It demonstrates the growth of government commitment to services, especially communication, for the region between Sydney and Brisbane during the 19th century. The building is associated with Colonial Architect James Barnet, under whose direction the original building was designed and built. The building illustrates changing commercial patterns through the 20th century.

The place is important in demonstrating aesthetic characteristics and/or a high degree of creative or technical achievement in New South Wales.

The former CBA Bank is part of an important historic precinct centred on the Beardy/Faulkner Streets intersection. Its pleasantly symmetrical façade shares aesthetic similarities to many of the adjoining buildings resulting in a particular streetscape harmony. It relates well to the Post Office at No.158, and the Court House.

The place has a strong or special association with a particular community or cultural group in New South Wales for social, cultural or spiritual reasons.

As a prominent civic building in a historic precinct, the former CBA Bank is considered to be significant to the Armidale community's sense of place.

The place has potential to yield information that will contribute to an understanding of the cultural or natural history of New South Wales.

The site has the potential to contain an archaeological resource, which may provide information relating to the previous use of the site, and to use by the Telegraph Office.

The place is important in demonstrating the principal characteristics of a class of cultural or natural places/environments in New South Wales.

Part of the group of NSW government buildings. Representative of the work of the Colonial/Government Architect's office.
