= Ben Lomond, New South Wales =

Ben Lomond
- Town
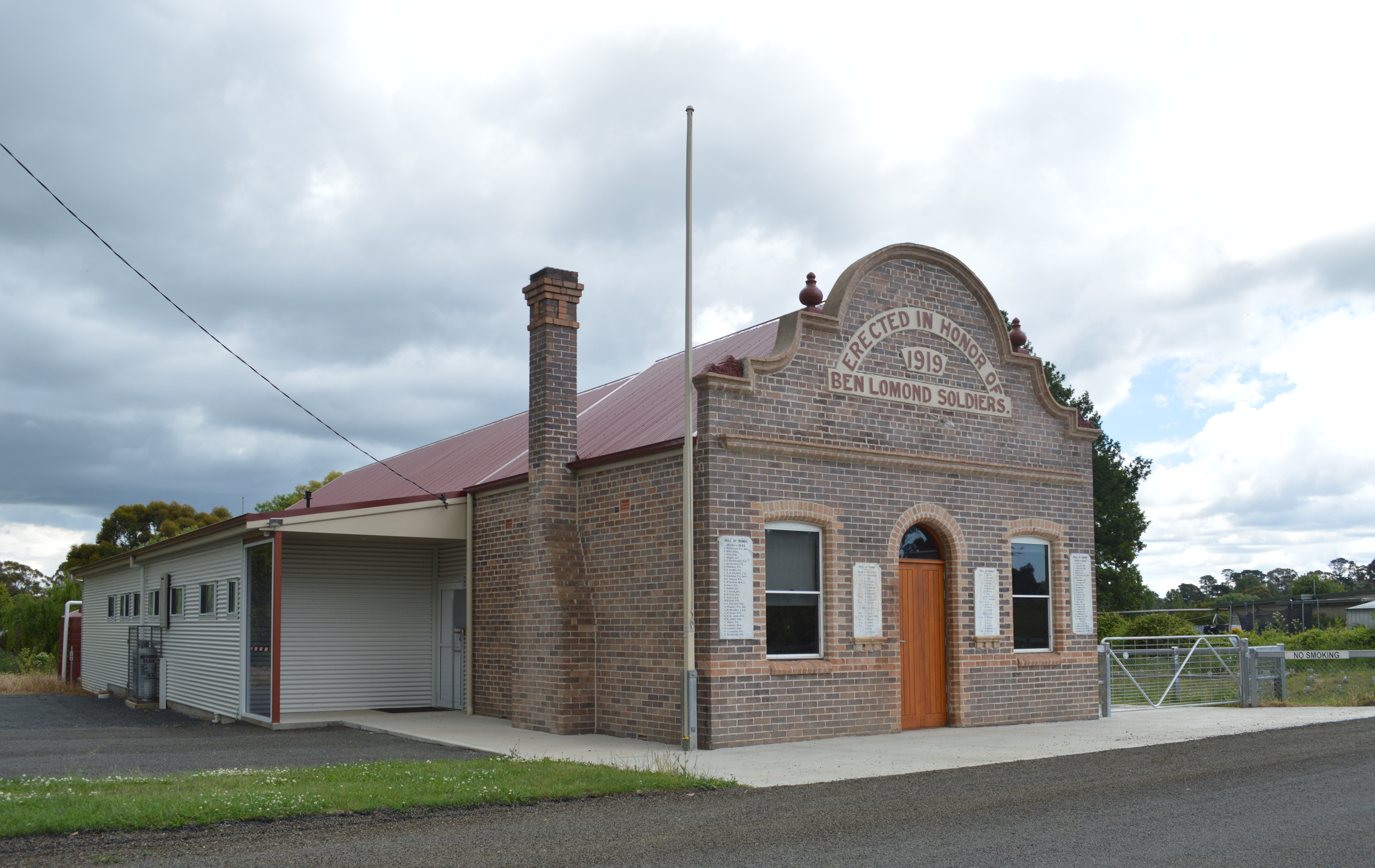
- Soldiers Memorial Hall, 2017

- Coordinates: 30°01′19″S 151°39′37″E
- Country: Australia
- State: New South Wales
- LGA: Armidale Regional Council
- Location: 571 km (355 mi) N of Sydney; 402 km (250 mi) S of Brisbane; 62 km (39 mi) N of Armidale; 37 km (23 mi) S of Glen Innes

Government
  - State electorate: Northern Tablelands
  - Federal division: New England
- Elevation: 1,364 m (4,475 ft)

Population
  - Total: 152 (2016 census)
- Postcode: 2365
- County: Hardinge

Ben Lomond is a village on the Northern Tablelands in the New England region of New South Wales, Australia. The village is situated 6 km off the New England Highway between Armidale and Glen Innes. It was located in the Guyra Shire local government area until that council was amalgamated into the Armidale Regional Council on 12 May 2016, with parts of the surrounding district in Glen Innes Severn Shire and Inverell Shire. It is primarily a farming area, with most of the residents involved in sheep, cattle and grain farming.

Ben Lomond Village is at 1,370 m elevation, making it the highest inhabited locality in Australia. As such, even though it is located only a few hours' drive from the Queensland border, it receives occasional falls of snow in Winter. Overlooking the village are mountains known as "The Two Brothers", which have a peak elevation of 1,508 metres.

== History ==
The name Ben Lomond originated from Ben Lomond in Scotland.

In 1848, the Manooan (Marowan) run of 17,000 acres (69 km^{2}) had the Ben Lomond Range as its southern boundary. In the 1860s there was a station named Ben Lomond which had been robbed by Captain Thunderbolt, who frequented the region. The slow climb and timber on the Ben Lomond Range proved an ideal place for the robbery of coaches and travellers.

The Dumaresq to Glen Innes section of the Main North railway Line, which included Ben Lomond, opened on 19 August 1884. At 1,363 metres (4,472 ft), Ben Lomond railway station was the highest railway station in New South Wales until the Skitube opened in 1987. Ben Lomond railway station closed on 10 December 1985, followed by the Dumaresq-Glen Innes section on 3 October 1993.

Ben Lomond Post Office opened on 4 November 1879 and closed in 1979. A school was established in January 1881, initially as a "provisional school" because there were not the 15 children to justify opening a full public school. In March 1883 it was upgraded to a full Public School. Due to low enrolment, the school will close in 2027.

Ben Lomond was serviced by a general store providing the majority of day-to-day needs as well as farming supplies until it closed in November 2007.

== Heritage listings ==
Ben Lomond has a number of heritage-listed sites, including:

- Main Northern railway: Ben Lomond railway station
- Ben Lomond War Memorial Hall
- Church – Presbyterian
- Church – St Patrick's Catholic Church and Cemetery
- Church – St Pauls Anglican Church

== Present day ==
=== Population ===
The 2016 census did not report separate figures for the village of Ben Lomond. Instead, it reports a "Census area" named "Ben Lomond" which covers a considerable area (816 square km), especially to the east of Ben Lomond township, including the small settlements of Llangothlin, Tibbamurra, Falconer, Bald Blair and Green Hills. That census area had a recorded population of 152. Of these people:

- The median age was 53 years, compared to the national median of 38. Children aged 0–14 years made up 12.8% of the population and people aged 65 years and over made up 27.0% of the population.
- 84.7% were born in Australia; the next most popular response was England (2.2%).
- Of the employed people, 28.6% worked in beef cattle Farming, followed by sheep-beef cattle Farming 14.3%, sheep farming 7.1%, central government administration 7.1% and primary education 7.1%.

=== Features ===
Ben Lomond Public School, located on Inn Road, has been reduced in recent years from thirty students in the mid nineties to a current enrolment of around twelve students.

Ben Lomond has three Churches representing the Anglican, Presbyterian and Roman Catholic denominations.

Ben Lomond is home to several tourist attractions, including home stays, the longest hand cut railway cutting on the Great Northern Line, the highest passenger railway station in the southern hemisphere (at the time of the construction of the railway), and a scattering of old and historical relics of past times in and around the village. Other amenities include a community hall and a volunteer brigade of the Rural Fire Service.

The highland areas that include the Ben Lomond district are the focus areas for possible development of large scale wind farms. The original proposal was by Allco, which ran into severe financial problems and eventually liquidated on 4 November 2008, so that project was abandoned.

Ben Lomond community has traditionally been active through several groups and local initiatives to maintain and progress the village and district. In recent years the village has formed something of a local rivalry with neighbouring Glen Innes in the form of an annual inter-town friendly cricket match. Whilst at a substantial size disadvantage, Ben Lomond have won four of the games so far, and drawn the other. Games are played on the Ben Lomond Recreational Ground, which once played host to regular games but is seldom used outside of the fixture.
