= Dumaresq railway station =

Historic site in new South Wales, Australia

Dumaresq
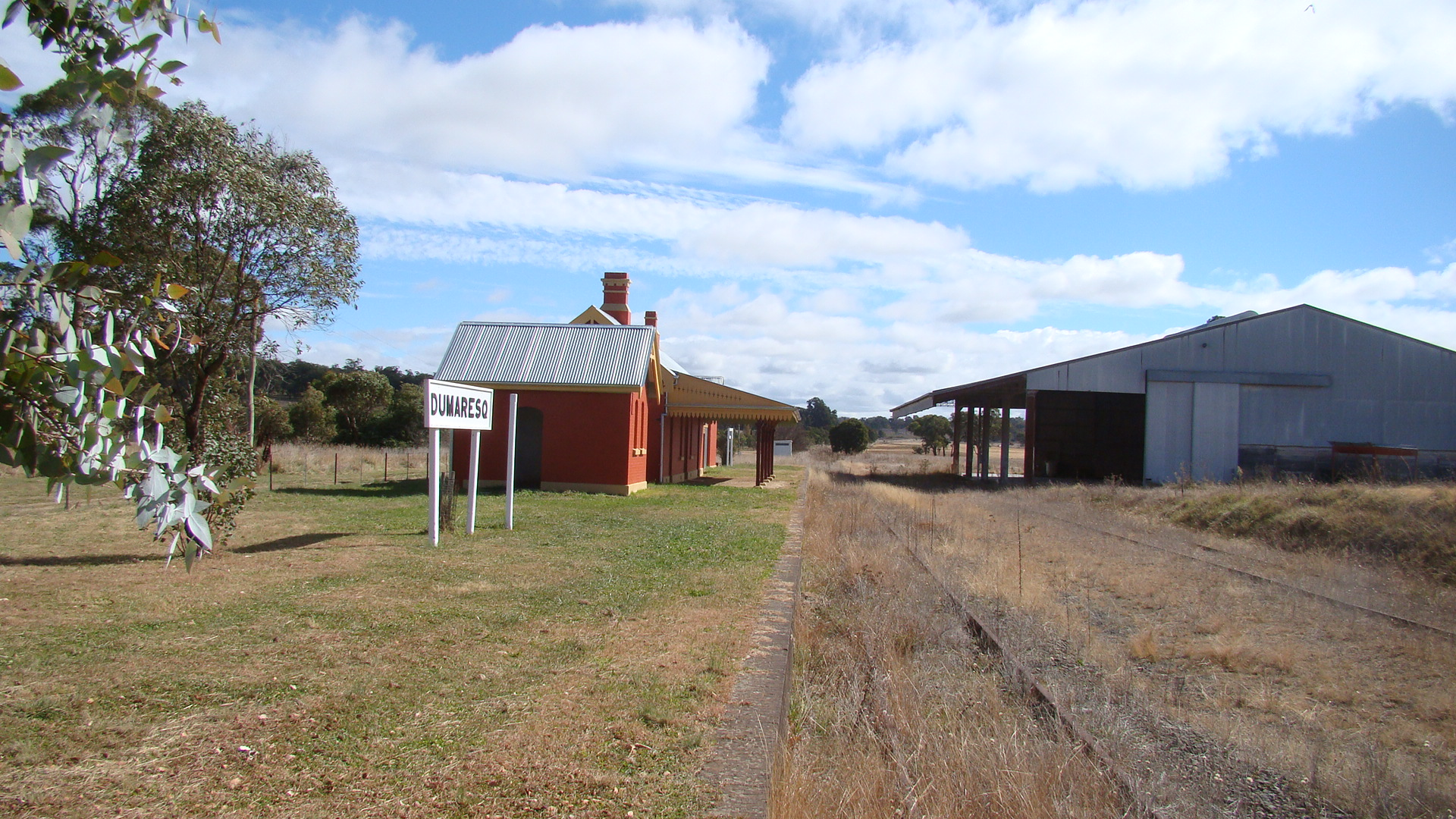
- The disused station in 2011

General information
- Location: 537 Dumaresq Road, Dumaresq, New South Wales; Australia
- Coordinates: 30°27′41″S 151°34′52″E
- Owner: Transport Asset Holding Entity
- Line: Main North
- Distance: 588.700 km from Central
- Platforms: 1 (1 side)
- Tracks: 2

Other information
- Status: Closed

History
- Opened: 19 August 1884
- Closed: 16 December 1974
- Former names: Inverella (1884–1885); Eversleigh (1885–1889)

Services
Preceding station	Former services	Following station
Black Mountain towards Wallangarra	Main Northern Line	Armidale towards Sydney

New South Wales Heritage Register
- Official name: Dumaresq Railway station group
- Type: State heritage (complex / group)
- Designated: 2 April 1999
- Reference no.: 1132
- Type: Railway Platform/Station
- Category: Transport – Rail
Location
- Location within New South Wales

Dumaresq railway station is a heritage-listed closed railway station located on a disused section of the Main North line at Dumaresq, New South Wales, Australia. The property was added to the New South Wales State Heritage Register on 2 April 1999.

== History ==
In 1878 the Great Northern Line (GNL) had reached Tamworth (now West Tamworth railway station). A few years earlier, in c. 1875, the Minister for Works instructed the Engineer-in-Chief of the NSW Railways, John Whitton, to commence trial surveys for the planned extension of the Great Northern Line beyond Tamworth to at least as far as Tenterfield (and later to the Queensland border). Two routes were considered for the northern extension from Tamworth to Tenterfield: via Armidale or via Inverell. After much debate, in May 1878 the decision was made to construct the northern extension of the GNL via Armidale, with the proposed route incorporating what is now the town of Dumaresq.

The Great Northern Line later reached Tamworth (1882), Uralla (1882), Armidale (1883), Inverella (Dumaresq) (1884), Black Mountain (1884), Glen Innes (1884), and Tenterfield (1886). The passenger station at Dumaresq opened as Inverella in 1884, with the name changing to Eversleigh in 1885 and finally Dumaresq in 1889.

Scant information has been found regarding the history of the railway station and yard at Dumaresq. In addition to the station building, a Station Master's residence was provided (probably from the opening of the station in 1884) but details of other structures within the yard have not been identified. The station closed on 16 December 1974 and the Station Master's residence was later sold, probably in the 1990s. As of 2009 the station building was vacant and has remained in ownership of the Transport Asset Holding Entity .

== Description ==
Extant items include the type 4, third-class brick station building (1884), brick platform face (1884) and station signs.

The station building retains a high level of intactness

The former Station Master's residence is privately owned.

== Heritage listing ==
Dumaresq is one of a significant group of late nineteenth century railway buildings located along a section of the Northern Line between Armidale and the Queensland border. The station building is a good representative example of a late Victorian station building constructed in NSW in the 1880s. It displays symmetry and some restrained decorative features and is closely linked to the early development of Dumaresq and surrounding districts, particularly in the late nineteenth century.

Dumaresq Railway station was listed on the New South Wales State Heritage Register on 2 April 1999 having satisfied the following criteria.

The place is important in demonstrating the course, or pattern, of cultural or natural history in New South Wales.

The station building at Dumaresq was built during a period of extensive railway construction in NSW in the late 19th century and as such is linked to the rapid expansion of railway infrastructure in the New England region and in other parts of NSW in the 1880s.

The place has a strong or special association with a person, or group of persons, of importance of cultural or natural history of New South Wales's history.

No direct association has been identified with any notable individual.

The place is important in demonstrating aesthetic characteristics and/or a high degree of creative or technical achievement in New South Wales.

The station building at Dumaresq is a good example of late 19th century station design befitting the location of the station within a small rural town. The station building displays symmetry and some restrained decorative features, including bargeboards, pendants and a small but elegant veranda.

The place has a strong or special association with a particular community or cultural group in New South Wales for social, cultural or spiritual reasons.

The station building (and to a lesser extent the former yard) at Dumaresq is likely to have social significance to the local community as a highly visible building which provides a tangible link to the development of the town and region from the late 19th century.

The place is important in demonstrating the principal characteristics of a class of cultural or natural places/environments in New South Wales.

The station building is a good representative example of a late Victorian station building, with excellent detailing and proportion, one of a series of similar railway passenger stations constructed along the former Northern Line in the late 19th century.

== See also ==
- List of disused regional railway stations in New South Wales
