= Lidcombe Hospital Precinct =

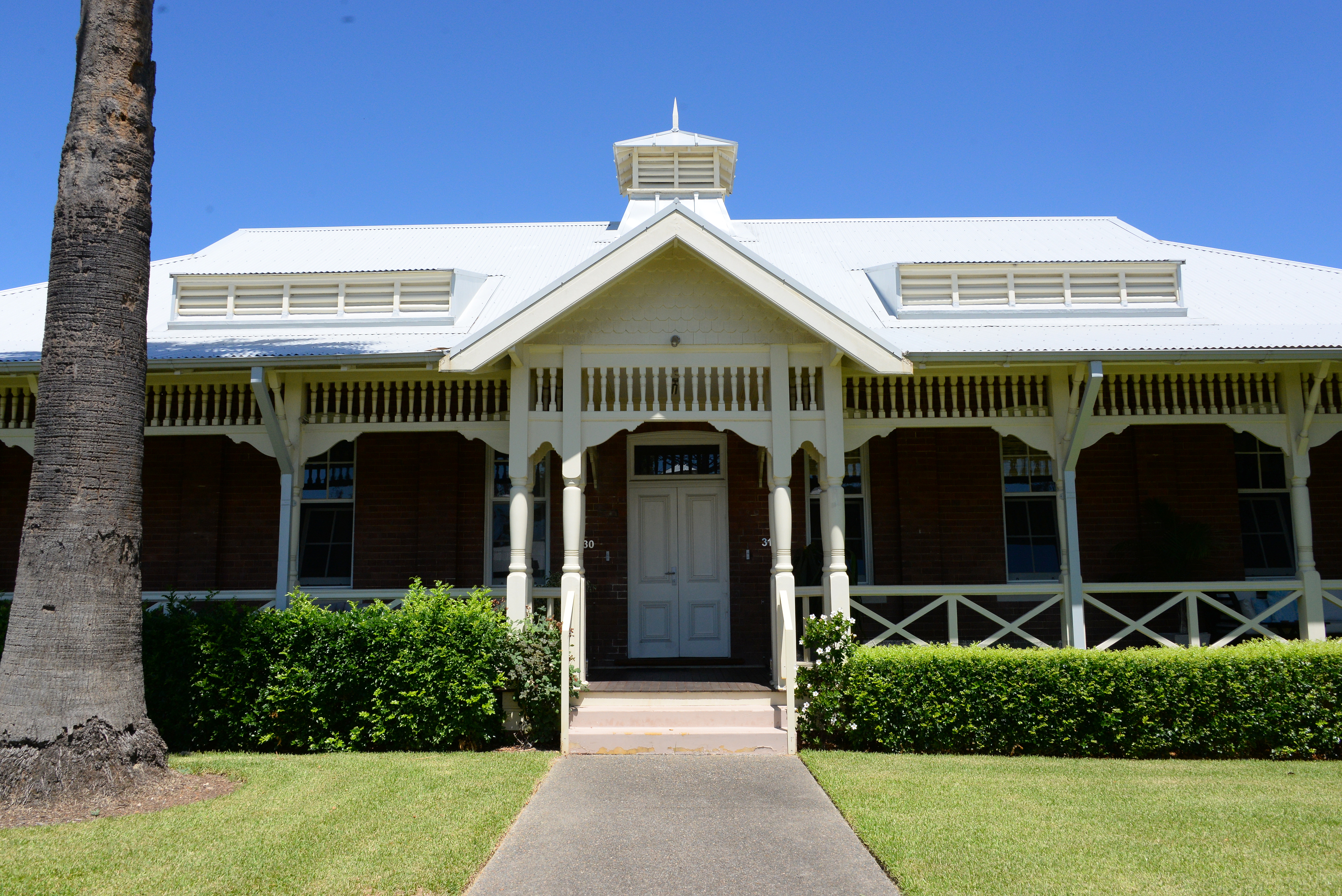
- One of the buildings in the former Lidcombe Hospital

- Location within Sydney
- 33°53′01″S 151°02′42″E
- Location: Joseph Street, Lidcombe, Cumberland Council, New South Wales, Australia

History
- Built: 1885–

Site notes
- Architects: James Barnet; Walter Liberty Vernon; Cobden Parkes; Ken Woolley
- Owner: Australand Industrial No. 18 Pty Limited; Sydney Olympic Park Authority

New South Wales Heritage Register
- Official name: Lidcombe Hospital Precinct; Rookwood Asylum for the Aged and Infirm; Rookwood State Hospital and Asylum for Men; Lidcombe State Hospital & Home; Rookwood Boys Reformatory & Model Farm
- Type: State heritage (complex / group)
- Designated: 24 February 2006
- Reference no.: 1744
- Type: Hospital
- Category: Health Services
- Builders: NSW Government

Lidcombe Hospital Precinct is a heritage-listed former hospital and home for the aged, now converted to private housing, located at Joseph Street, Lidcombe, Cumberland Council, New South Wales, Australia. It was designed by James Barnet, Walter Liberty Vernon, Cobden Parkes and Ken Woolley and built from 1885 by the Government of New South Wales. It is also known as Rookwood Asylum for the Aged and Infirm; Rookwood State Hospital and Asylum for Men; Lidcombe State Hospital & Home; Rookwood Boys Reformatory & Model Farm. The property is now owned by Australand Industrial No. 18 Pty Limited and the Sydney Olympic Park Authority. It was added to the New South Wales State Heritage Register on 24 February 2006.

== History ==
Six key phases of development demonstrate the evolution of the site, from proposed reformatory and model farm for wayward boys to an important teaching hospital that specialised in geriatric care and rehabilitation until its transformation into the Media Village for the 2000 Summer Olympics. An innovative aspect of the development of the site was Sydney's first septic tank with associated facilities, constructed in 1897–1898 to alleviate the inadequacies of the existing system. A summary of key development dates is provided below:

- 1885–1892: Boys Reformatory and Model Farm (proposed).
- 1893–1913: Rookwood Asylum for the Aged and Infirm.
- 1914–1926: Lidcombe State Hospital and Asylum for Men.
- 1927–1966: Lidcombe State Hospital and Home.
- 1966–1995: Lidcombe Hospital (Note: the Jack Lang Wing remained in use for hospital purposes until 1997).
- 1998–2000: Olympic Media Village.

The Lidcombe Hospital Recreation Hall and Chapel was designed by architect Ken Woolley.

Demolition of the less significant hospital buildings and structures from the hospital site began in 2004. From 2006 to 2011, seven hectares of total 44-hectare hospital site underwent adaptive reuse, with the former historic core of buildings converted to apartments. 10 single level cottages became nine strata-titled homes as part of the new "Botanica" master-planned community by developer Australand. The two storey superintendent's house became a five-bedroom house on a Torrens title.

== Description ==
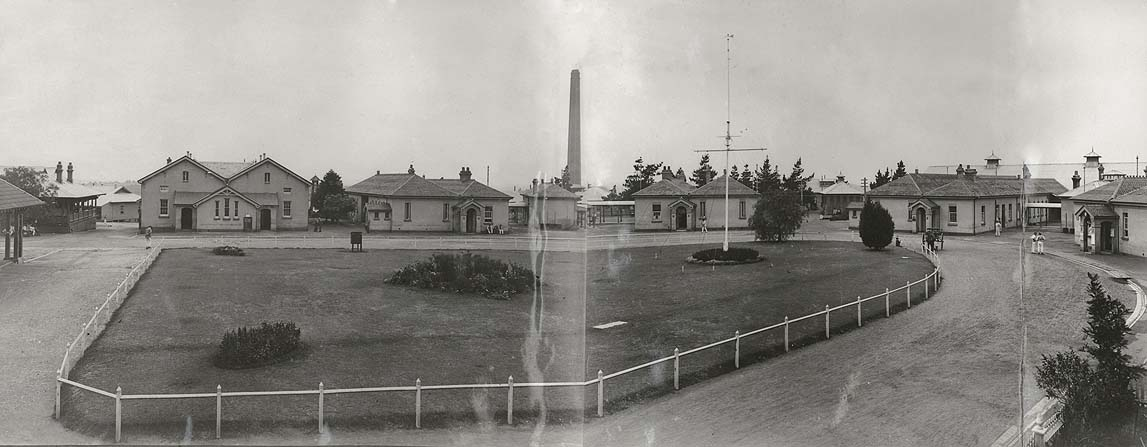
Lidcombe State Hospital and Home

The Lidcombe Hospital site contains a variety of buildings and landscape features in a landscaped setting. It also contains historical archaeological features which provide physical evidence of the development of the site from the late nineteenth century to the present day. The site boundaries have changed substantially since the proposed Boys Reformatory and Model Farm was proposed in 1885, having expanded and contracted during its evolution.

Buildings include:

- Herdsman's Cottage;
- Gatehouse;
- Barnet-designed dormitory wards;
- Barnet-designed Dining Hall and Kitchen;
- Barnet-designed Superintendent's Residence;
- Barnet-designed Toilet Block (Building 89A) and ablutions facilities (Building 9A);
- Vernon-designed nine pavilion wards;
- Vernon-designed No.1 Nurse's Home (and 1919 annex);
- Vernon-designed Gatehouse;
- Vernon-designed dormitory ward additions;
- Vernon-designed ablutions facilities (Building 8A);
- Boiler House attributed to Walter Liberty Vernon;
- Parkes-designed Nurse's Homes Nos 2 and 3;
- three fibro buildings; the Male Nurse Amenities (Building 96, the two Red Cross Buildings (Buildings 95A and 95B);
- WWII Air Raid Shelter;
- 1953 Memorial Clock in the village green;
- three Parkes-designed 1930s/1940s ward buildings; and
- Woolley-designed Recreation Hall.

Road and landscape elements include:

- Village Green, Areas 1 and 2 and vistas within the Village Green;
- Farm Road;
- Main Avenue;
- Mance Avenue;
- Brooks Circuit;
- Copeland Road;
- Church Street;
- Sussex Street;
- Peden Lane;
- Chapel Road;
- Palm Circuit;
- hoop pine and open space (site of former Administration Building) at junction of Main Avenue and Brooks Circuit at the entry to the historic core (32);
- avenue of hoop pines (Araucaria cunninghamii) and phoenix palms (Phoenix sp.) ((33);
- avenue of tallowwoods (Eucalyptus microcorys) (14);
- remnant plantings (hoop pine, pepper tree (Schinus areira), flame tree (Brachychiton acerifolium) (15);
- Moreton Bay fig (Ficus macrophllya) and row of tallowwoods (Eucalyptus microcorys) (16);
- avenue of plantings at rear of historic core, Moreton Bay figs (Ficus macrophylla) and brush boxes (Lophostemon confertus) (17);
- petticoat and cotton palms in eastern area of historic core (Washingtonia robusta and Washingtonia filifera) (20);
- mixed plantings east of Superintendent's Residence (21);
- mixed plantings in Area 1 of Village Green opposite Superintendent's Residence (25);
- Chinese juniper (Juniperus chinensis) (37);
- hoop pine (Araucaria cunninghamii) and phoenix palm (Phoenix sp.) (38);
- avenue of Canary Island palms (Phoenix canariensis) (41);
- plantings at Palm Avenue (south end of triangle) (42);
- northern end of Sussex Street (roadway and palms) (43)
- red ironbark (Eucalyptus fibrosa) (46);
- plantings associated with Nurses Quarters No. 1 and No. 3 (18);
- plantings associated with Nurses Quarters No. 2 (19);
- boundary planting south of Superintendent's Residence (22);
- plantings for Olympic Media Village in Village Green Area 1 (24);
- double row of brush box (Lophostemon confertus) (28);
- row of cypresses (Cupressus species) (29);
- mixed plantings northwest corner of historic core (30);
- mixed plantings to southern sector of original triangle (39);
- eucalypts and palms (40);
- triangular bed at fulcrum of Mance Ave and Sussex Street (48);
- plantings for Olympic Media Village along Mance Avenue (62);
- landscape feature north of Vernon-designed wards (63);
- pond, bridge and plantings north (rear) of Vernon-designed wards (64); and
- plantings for Olympic Media Village near Chapel Road (65).
- grove of mixed gums (Eucalyptus spp.) (57) on a separate portion of the former hospital site to the remainder of the listing.

=== Condition ===
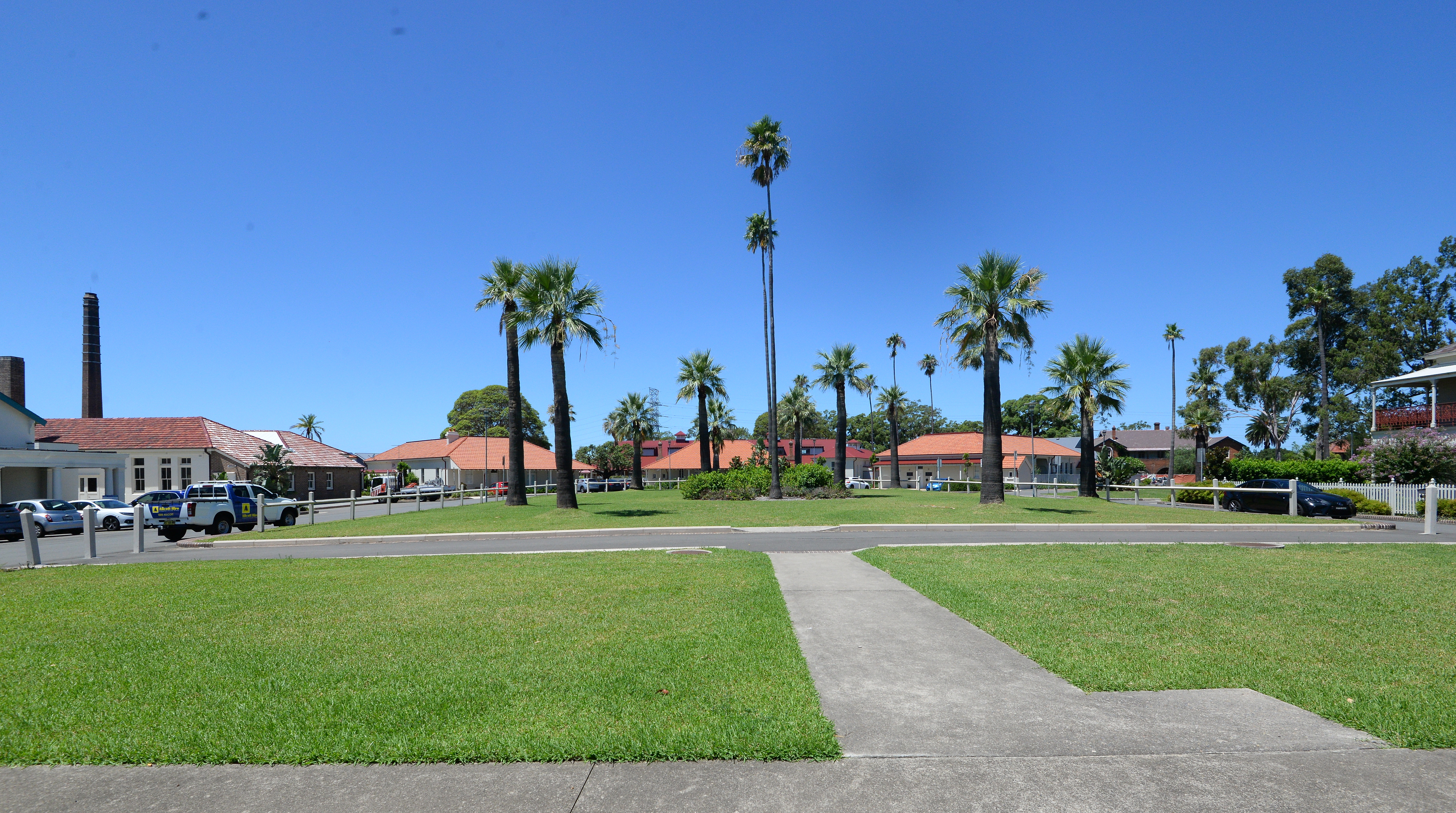
The Village Green, a centre of community activity when the site was a hospital

The physical condition of the buildings, roads and plantings was reported as generally stable as at 7 August 2003. The site has been well secured. Archaeological potential resources are associated with the initial establishment of the proposed Boys Reformatory and Model Farm.

Archaeological features and deposits associated with the development of the Asylum and State Hospital have the potential to enhance the available information relating to the care and hospitalisation of the aged, infirm and destitute.

There is little research potential in archaeological remains associated with the development of the site after WWII. This period is well known and understood in the development of health care facilities in NSW.

Archaeological remains of the first institutional septic tank constructed in Australia are located within the neighbouring University of Sydney Cumberland College campus. Associated archaeological elements may be located within the Lidcombe Hospital site.

The Lidcombe State Hospital – Aboriginal Archaeological Survey prepared by Mary Dallas Consulting Archaeologists for Devine Erby Mazlin in 1997 found no evidence of Aboriginal cultural material and concluded that there were no archaeological constraints to the proposed re-use of the Lidcombe Hospital site.

The majority of buildings outside the Lidcombe Hospital Precinct have now been demolished and substantial changes have been made to the landscape to prepare the site for a residential development. The Lidcombe Hospital Precinct contains all early extant buildings to the 1940s and other built elements from the 1950s and 1960s, and the most significant parts of the road network. While hospital infrastructure has been adapted to accommodate new technologies and uses, the essential character of the Precinct remains intact. The core of the Precinct, centred on the Village Green very strongly reflects the key values of the site.

All of the buildings and roads of exceptional and high significance are located within the curtilage of the precinct. The majority of significant landscape elements are also located within this precinct. The precinct retains substantial evidence of all periods of development of the site from Boys Reformatory, through State Hospital to Olympic Media Village.

== Heritage listing ==
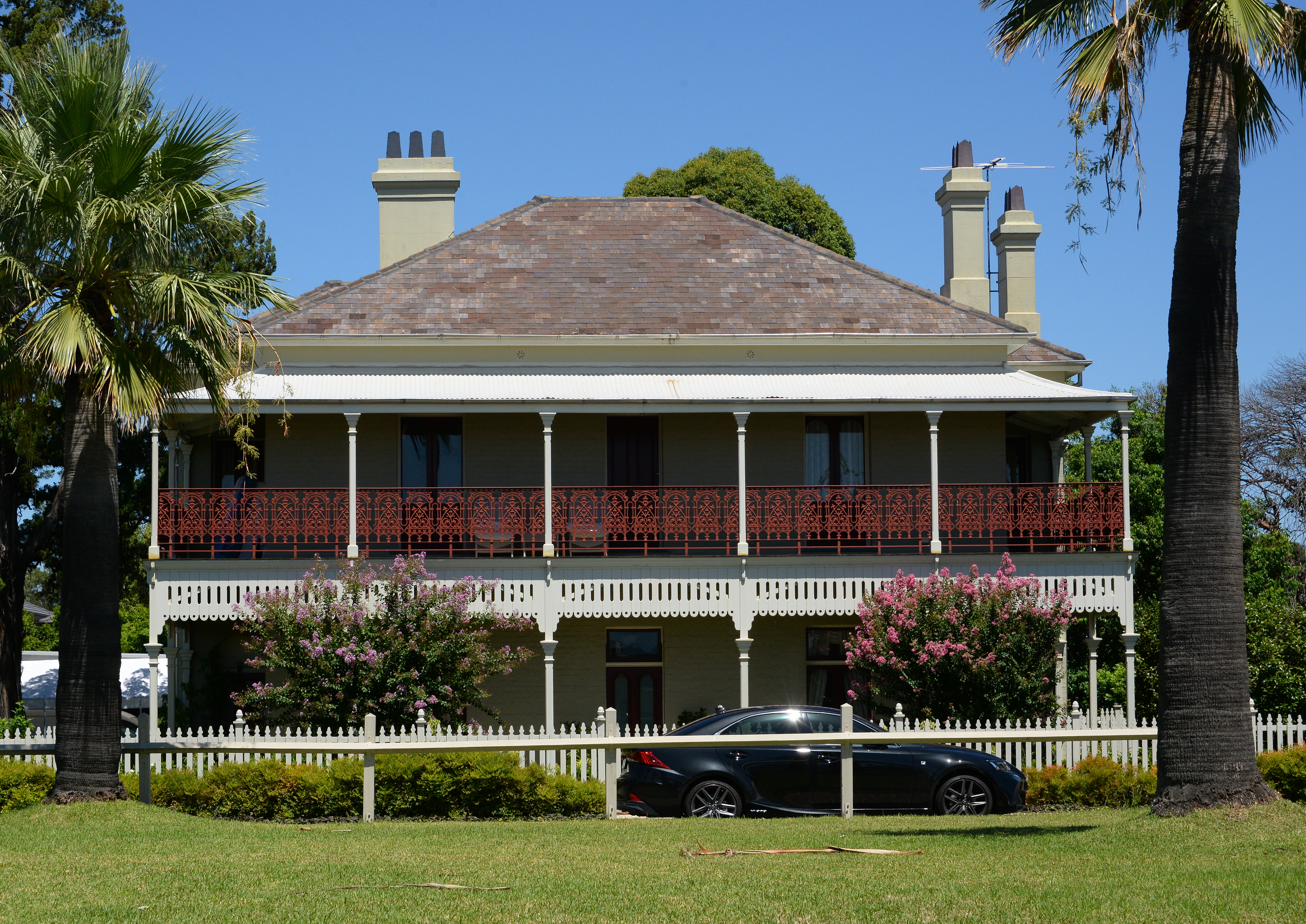
Superintendent's house

Lidcombe Hospital is of outstanding significance in the history of NSW health care, operating for over a century from 1893 to 1995 as a major State Asylum for the aged and infirm, then an important State teaching hospital specialising in geriatric care and rehabilitation. Lidcombe Hospital became a leader in geriatric care and rehabilitation practices in the 20th Century. The expansion, then the closure, of the hospital reflects the changes in State and Commonwealth government health care policies over the twentieth century. The site has significance for its association with innovative medical practitioners, specialists in geriatric health care, nurses and the local community for over a century. As the site of the Media Village, the place also has associations with the 2000 Sydney Olympic Games, which provided short-term accommodation for approximately 5,000 visiting journalists.

The precinct contains an exceptional and rare collection of fine, intact architecture and landscapes of the Victorian, Edwardian, Interwar and late-20th Century styles, together with outstanding examples of asylum and institutional planning from leading Colonial, Government and private architects from the 19th and 20th Centuries. The asylum and hospital planning is an exceptional example of the 19th century advancements in health care along the principles of Florence Nightingale, where it was considered healthy to surround hospital and asylum buildings with gardens as part of patient treatment and the buildings were designed with particular attention to natural light, ventilation and climate control for the care of patients. The collection of reformatory, asylum and hospital buildings include dormitories designed by James Barnet (1885–1887), the former Dining Hall (1885), the Superintendent's Residence (1887) and nine wards designed by Walter Liberty Vernon (1893–1906). All reformatory and asylum buildings are designed in harmony around the central Village Green and unite qualities of shelter and surveillance, community and destitution, within a landscape both picturesque and functionally self-sufficient. The Recreation Hall and Chapel (1963) designed by Ken Woolley, the No. 1 Nurses Quarters (1910), Herdsman's Cottage (c. 1885), Boiler House and Chimney (1901) and the later Nos 2 and 3 Nurses Quarters (1931 and 1939) all contribute to the aesthetic and historic qualities of the place.

The nine Vernon-designed wards, individually and collectively, are outstanding examples of hospital pavilion buildings in a bungalow form, which are a deliberate continuation of the hospital pavilion typology found in some French and British Colonies of the time, with innovative design variations demonstrating the early use of the colonial vernacular in NSW public buildings and advancements in design for patient care. Australian designs for naturally ventilated hospital wards were well known internationally. Vernon's work demonstrated greater attention to light and ventilation than English examples and landscaping of a much higher standard. The ward buildings demonstrate Vernon's deliberate (and early) use of the Australian Colonial vernacular in his design of public buildings, particularly the wrap-around verandah as a means of climate control, rather than the Italianate arcade or colonnade. The building designs of Vernon at Lidcombe Hospital thereby represent one of a series of public buildings built in NSW, such as the Lands Board Office, the Bourke Courthouse and Grafton Experiment Farm buildings, that mark the search for a distinctly Australian architecture, an architecture that drew on the colonial vernacular.

The earliest roads demonstrate the pattern of development of the Lidcombe Hospital site and the location of the former farming activities and isolation facilities of the earlier Asylum and hospital periods, including Farm Road, Mance Avenue, Brooks Circuit, Main Avenue, Church Street, Sussex Street, Copeland Road and Peden Lane. Landscape plantings including the hoop pines and phoenix palms, tallowwoods, brush boxes, iron barks, pepper trees and spotted gums contribute to the aesthetic qualities of the precinct, including a surviving grove of eucalypts situated on a separate portion of the former hospital site. The Village Green, at the centre of the precinct, is of outstanding significance at a State level for its historic and aesthetic qualities.

The archaeological resource of the site has the potential to contribute to our understanding of the early modifications of the landscape through farming activities and the development of early institutional care for the aged, infirm and the destitute. The hospital was the site of first septic tank system constructed on a large scale to service an institution in Australia. Remains of the Tank are now located on an adjacent site but infrastructure associated with this system may survive.

The Lidcombe Hospital site has played a significant role in the development of the surrounding suburban areas and the growth of the local area as an employer. It has also acted as a physical barrier to development within the area. The Lidcombe Hospital has continued to be held in high esteem by the local community, including in the present day a number of local community groups, for its cultural, social and landscape values.

Lidcombe Hospital Precinct was listed on the New South Wales State Heritage Register on 24 February 2006 having satisfied the following criteria.

The place is important in demonstrating the course, or pattern, of cultural or natural history in New South Wales.

The Lidcombe Hospital site was in continual use for over 100 years, initially providing care and shelter for destitute men, then evolving into an important State teaching hospital providing a comprehensive range of community health care facilities.

The Lidcombe Hospital site, as a whole, contains physical evidence of major public works associated with changes in State and Commonwealth health care policy.

From its inception as a proposed Boys Reformatory and Model Farm, to an Asylum for destitute men through to a State teaching hospital, eventually specialising in geriatric care and rehabilitation, the Lidcombe Hospital Precinct demonstrates the changing attitudes of managing and caring for the aged, infirm and destitute.

The Lidcombe Hospital Precinct shows the design and development of a government welfare institution initially reliant upon a self-sustaining farm.

Lidcombe Hospital site shows the design of an institution that had to isolate its proposed function as a Boys Reformatory from the surrounding community, and how it developed to accommodate medical isolation facilities, such as the Scabies and Epilepsy Wards, then evolved to more general health care functions.

In 1919 Rookwood State Hospital and Asylum for Men was the largest institution of its type in the Commonwealth.

The Lidcombe Hospital site played a significant role during the 2000 Sydney Olympics providing accommodation and facilities for over 5,000 journalists. It was temporarily renamed Olympic Media Village.

It is important in demonstrating the colonial government's response to institutionalised housing and care of wayward boys and destitute and infirm men.

The Lidcombe Hospital Precinct is important in demonstrating the concept of a self-sustaining public welfare institution that required intensive farming operations to support its functions.

The Lidcombe Hospital Precinct is important for its role as an Asylum with working farm providing produce to other state institutions. Despite there being little physical evidence of this aspect of operations remaining it is an important historic value associated with the site.

The Lidcombe Hospital site is important for providing and developing geriatric health care and rehabilitation facilities and health care programs during the twentieth century.

The Lidcombe Hospital Precinct reflects changes in State health policy during the twentieth century. The decline and subsequent closure of Lidcombe Hospital reflects the changing emphasis of healthcare for the aged to keep people out of institutions and in their own homes, by integrating geriatric care services provided by general practitioners, hospital outreach services and voluntary agencies.

Lidcombe Hospital in the 1960s and 1970s was a leader in New South Wales in the medical speciality of "geriatrics" and the treatment and rehabilitation needs of the elderly.

The Lidcombe Hospital site was transformed during the 2000 Sydney Olympics by providing housing for approximately 5,000 journalists. It demonstrates the important government and community commitment to a major public event.

The Lidcombe Hospital site has played a significant part in the development of many of the surrounding suburban areas and the growth of local communities, both as an employer and as a physical barrier to suburban expansion.

The Lidcombe Hospital site has maintained continuous health care for those in need from the 1890s until its closure in 1995–97.

The Lidcombe Hospital Precinct demonstrates the continually changing needs and responses to the treatment and care of the elderly.

The place has a strong or special association with a person, or group of persons, of importance of cultural or natural history of New South Wales's history.

The Lidcombe Hospital Precinct demonstrates the changes in the practice of accommodating and caring for the homeless, destitute and the elderly during the twentieth century.

In 1967, Medical Superintendent George Procopis developed Lidcombe Hospital, as a whole, into an important geriatric hospital with emphasis on activity and rehabilitation therapy; and included treatment and rehabilitation for patients suffering alcoholism, demonstrating the hospitals commitment to innovative and progressive health care.

Dr Tinsley established a full rehabilitation department in 1961 at Lidcombe Hospital and developed programs to actively improve physical and mental facilities and quality of life for aged and disabled persons, demonstrating evolving attitudes to geriatric health.

The Lidcombe Hospital site, as a whole, is significant for its association with Dr Piere Fiaschi and the advanced techniques he made in anaesthesia in 1919 when the Mettzer method of insufflation anaesthesia was introduced to the Sydney medical fraternity.

Many medical specialists, including Dr Lionel Cosins, an English geriatrician of note visited Lidcombe Hospital because of its advanced Rehabilitation Centre, indicating its professional reputation in geriatric medicine.

The Lidcombe Hospital Precinct has associations with the office of eight New South Wales Government Architects notably, James Barnet, Walter Liberty Vernon, George McRae, Cobden Parkes; and the architect Ken Woolley, in demonstrating evolving government design approaches to major public health infrastructure through the twentieth century.

The place is important in demonstrating aesthetic characteristics and/or a high degree of creative or technical achievement in New South Wales.

The precinct contains an exceptional and rare collection of fine, intact architecture and landscapes of the Victorian, Edwardian, Interwar and late-20th Century styles, together with outstanding examples of asylum and institutional planning from leading Colonial, Government and private architects from the 19th and 20th Centuries.

The asylum and hospital planning is an exceptional example of the 19th century advancements in NSW for health care along the principles of Florence Nightingale, where it was considered healthy to surround hospital and asylum buildings with gardens as part of patient treatment and the buildings were designed with particular attention to natural light, ventilation and climate control for the care of patients. Australian designs for naturally ventilated hospital wards were well known internationally, where for example, the examples by Hall and Dods in Brisbane were mentioned in advice on hospital design given by the English War Office in 1915.

The nine Vernon-designed wards, individually and collectively, are outstanding examples of hospital pavilion buildings also evidenced in some French and British colonies of the time, which demonstrate the deliberate continuation of the hospital pavilion and barracks designs of the Royal Engineers for the West Indies, with its own distinctive variations derived from the Australian colonial vernacular. This Colonial pavilion style was also employed in Sydney for the Rum Hospital and the Military Hospital on Observatory Hill, and in Newcastle for the James Fletcher Hospital. Examples of similar hospital pavilions are also evidenced in the French colonies. Overseas institutional layouts were visited by both Barnet and Vernon. Vernon's work demonstrated greater attention to light and ventilation than English examples and landscaping of a much higher standard.

Vernon's ward buildings also demonstrate the deliberate and early use of the Australian Colonial vernacular in the design of NSW public buildings, particularly the wrap-around verandah as a means of climate control, rather than the Italianate arcade or colonnade favoured during this stylistic period. The building designs of Vernon at Lidcombe Hospital thereby represent one of a series of public buildings built in NSW, such as the Lands Board Office, the Bourke Courthouse and Grafton Experiment Farm buildings, that mark the search for a distinctly Australian architecture, an architecture that drew on the colonial vernacular. It is possibly this incorporation of the colonial vernacular, along with the deliberately modest building scale, form and non-institutional design, that has led to the wards sometimes being described as being of a bungalow style, even though they were not designed as residences.

The nine Vernon-designed wards (1893–1906) demonstrate finely crafted and detailed timber and fretwork, roof vents, fleches, brick chimneys and encircling verandahs which are aesthetically distinctive. Both individually and collectively they contribute to the aesthetic values of the Lidcombe Hospital Precinct and the Lidcombe Hospital site as a whole.

The Lidcombe Hospital Precinct contains a rich ensemble of buildings that reflect changing technologies associated with the provision of medical care and public health administration for a period of over 100 years.

The Lidcombe Hospital Precinct is a visually distinctive cultural landscape with buildings sited along contour related roadways creating a "village" style institution within a landscaped setting.

The buildings around the Lidcombe Hospital Precinct including the Barnet-designed wards (1885–1887), Superintendent's Residence (1887), former Dining Hall (1885), the nine Vernon-designed wards (1893–1906) and the Village Green itself, have a strong aesthetic cohesiveness and create a harmonious arrangement of buildings around a landscaped open space.

A number of prominent built elements and landscape features, such as the phoenix palms and hoop pines along the Main Avenue, the Boiler House Chimney, the Clock Tower, the Village Green surrounded by the Barnet and Vernon-designed buildings, the Woolley-designed Recreation Hall and Chapel, the large fig trees and the separate grove of surviving mixed Eucalypts, are all landmark features within the Precinct.

The design of early buildings, their configuration and relationship to each other and the layout of the Lidcombe Hospital Precinct, including the roads, creates an aesthetically distinctive complex of hospital buildings that provides built evidence of significant phases of the development of an important health care facility in New South Wales.

The design and layout of the roads into and within the Lidcombe Hospital Precinct demonstrate the pattern of development and changes that have occurred. The earliest extant roads are important for the understanding of both the Lidcombe Hospital site, as a whole, and include Farm Road, Mance Avenue, Main Avenue, Brooks Circuit, Church Street, Sussex Street, Copeland Road and Peden Lane.

The architectural character of the Barnet and Vernon-designed buildings and their arrangement around the Village Green reflects late Victorian planning ideals for institutional facilities.

The Vernon-designed bungalow wards demonstrate an adaptation of the domestic bungalow design idiom to the larger institutional scale, also responding to Australian climatic conditions.

The sequence of buildings on the Lidcombe Hospital site as a whole reflects the changing attitudes to, and technologies of, health care and forms of accommodation thought suitable for patients and staff and architectural philosophies of the late nineteenth and twentieth centuries.

The place has a strong or special association with a particular community or cultural group in New South Wales for social, cultural or spiritual reasons.

The Lidcombe Hospital site is valued by former medical administrators, healthcare practitioners and nurses for: its prominence in development and training in the area of geriatric care and rehabilitation in New South Wales, and for its role as a teaching hospital.

The Lidcombe Hospital site was important to the local community in providing employment and access to a wide range of health care facilities. Local people have strong associations with the place as former staff, patients and visitors.

It is a place that is held in high esteem by a number of identifiable groups for its cultural and social values.

If the Lidcombe Hospital Precinct was damaged or destroyed, it would cause the community and cultural groups a sense of loss.

It is a place of particular importance and association for the Lidcombe Heritage Group Inc. and the Auburn District Historical Society.

The place has potential to yield information that will contribute to an understanding of the cultural or natural history of New South Wales.

The archaeological resource associated with the Lidcombe Hospital Precinct (in varying degrees depending on integrity) has the potential to contribute to and enhance the extant documentary and physical evidence concerning the development and use of the site over time.

The archaeological resource associated within the Lidcombe Hospital Precinct can contribute to an understanding about developments and changes in the treatment of the destitute, infirm and ailing during the nineteenth and twentieth centuries in Sydney.

The archaeological resource of much of the Lidcombe Hospital Precinct has the potential to yield information about the everyday functioning of the early institutions of asylums and homes for the destitute in a unique way through sufficiently intact physical remains which could provide meaningful information.

The archaeological resource associated with the first septic tank constructed in Australia and the possible relationship between the irrigation system stormwater channel and the sewerage system has the potential to yield information about the development of the early sewerage system and its technical innovation. The remains of the septic tank itself are no longer within the hospital boundary, but pipes and channels and associated infrastructure are likely to be located in the Lidcombe Hospital Precinct. (The remains of the septic tank are in the University of Sydney Cumberland College campus).

Archaeological investigations of the early road system could reveal details relating to modifications of the landscape and land use patterns over time that are not available in the documentary resource.

The major part of the former hospital site, beyond the Lidcombe Hospital Precinct, has low or no archaeological significance because it is unlikely to yield further information that will contribute to an understanding of the site's history. This is because no occupation occurred at those areas (occupation was ephemeral, or minor activities associated with the major phases of the site's history took place at those locations). In addition, they are the areas where site disturbance has so compromised archaeological resources that no meaningful information could be pursued through archaeological means.

The evolution of the Lidcombe Hospital Precinct from a facility for the care of the destitute, homeless, aged and infirm, with a self-sustaining farm, into an important teaching hospital specialising in geriatric health care and rehabilitation is a benchmark or reference type for such health care facilities in New South Wales.

The buildings constructed in the Lidcombe Hospital Precinct during the first phases of its development, designed by architects Barnet and Vernon, provide evidence of the government's architectural solution for late nineteenth and early twentieth-century institutions for wayward boys and homeless and destitute men.

The wards designed by Vernon provide evidence of late nineteenth and early twentieth-century methods of natural ventilation and climate control for dormitory-style buildings in New South Wales.

The place possesses uncommon, rare or endangered aspects of the cultural or natural history of New South Wales.

Lidcombe Hospital Precinct provides evidence of the type of self-sufficient institution developed in the late nineteenth century for the care of wayward boys and later for homeless and destitute men.

The Lidcombe Hospital Precinct, including the Barnet wards, the former Dining Hall, Superintendent's Residence and the Vernon bungalow wards, arranged around the Village Green, are a rare and intact group of institutional buildings reflecting the design philosophies for reformatories/asylums in the late nineteenth and early twentieth centuries.

The largely intact Vernon wards demonstrate a rare expression of the Australian Bungalow architectural style in an institutional setting, responding to the climate in New South Wales and adapted for institutional use.

The timber detailing, fretwork, roof vents, fleches, brick detailing and verandahs demonstrated in the Vernon ward buildings create a unique architectural aesthetic that is of exceptional interest.

The Lidcombe Hospital Precinct demonstrates the evolution, during the twentieth century, of an institution for the destitute into an important State teaching hospital for the wider community.

It would require further research and analysis to detail the extent to which the Lidcombe Hospital site demonstrates other aspects of the rarity this criterion.

The place is important in demonstrating the principal characteristics of a class of cultural or natural places/environments in New South Wales.

Lidcombe Hospital Precinct, with its historic, aesthetic, social significance, technical/research potential and rarity, provides ample evidence to represent the key State historic themes of science, government and administration, health, education, death and persons. It therefore satisfies all of the following inclusion guidelines:

- is a fine example of its type;
- has the potential characteristics of an important class or group of items;
- has attributes typical of a particular way of life, philosophy, custom, significant process, design, technique or activity;
- is a significant variation to a class of items;
- is part of a group, which collectively illustrates a representative type;
- is outstanding because of its setting, condition or size; and
- is outstanding because of its integrity; and
- is important for the esteem in which it is held.
