= Black Mountain railway station =

Railway station in New South Wales, Australia

Black Mountain
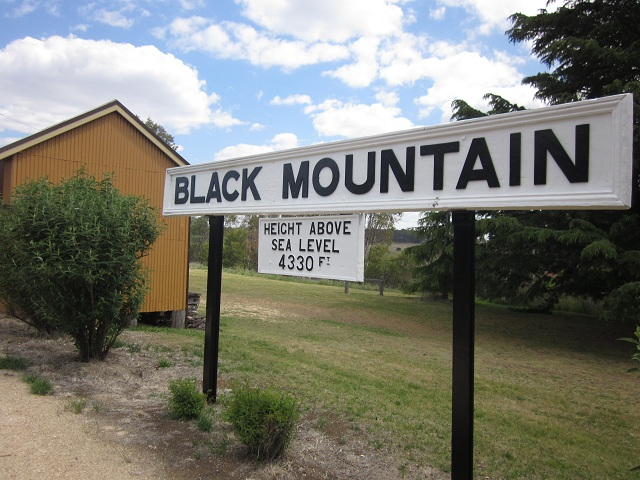
- Close up view of the restored station sign

General information
- Location: Toms Gully Road, Black Mountain, New South Wales; Australia
- Coordinates: 30.3096°S 151.6564°E
- Owner: Transport Asset Manager of New South Wales
- Line: Main North
- Distance: 611.930 km from Central
- Platforms: 1 (1 side)
- Tracks: 1

Construction
- Structure type: Ground

Other information
- Status: Closed

History
- Opened: 19 August 1884
- Closed: 1987
- Former names: Boorolong (1884–1886)

Services
Preceding station	Former services	Following station
Guyra towards Wallangarra	Main Northern Line	Dumaresq towards Sydney

New South Wales Heritage Register
- Official name: Black Mountain Railway Station
- Type: state heritage (built)
- Designated: 2 April 1999
- Reference no.: 1087
- Type: Railway Platform/Station
- Category: Transport – Rail
Location
- Location within New South Wales

Black Mountain railway station is a heritage-listed closed station on the Main Northern railway at Black Mountain in the New England region of New South Wales, Australia. The property was added to the New South Wales State Heritage Register on 2 April 1999.

== History ==
Black Mountain station opened on 19 August 1884 as Boorolong. It was renamed Black Mountain in 1886. The station closed in 1987.

The station complex is now maintained by a local community group, the Black Mountain Preservation Society.

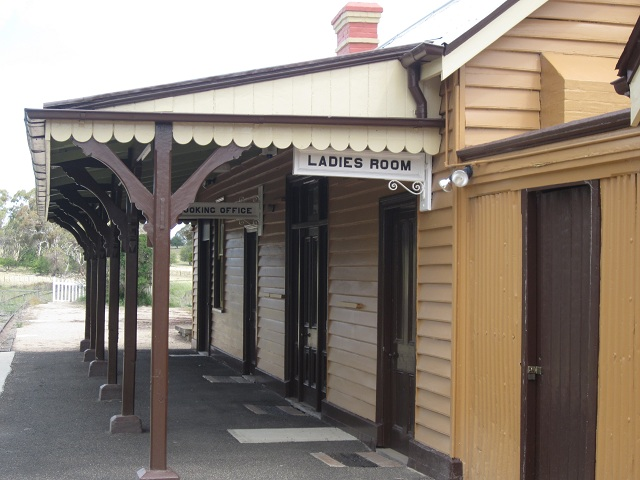
Southbound view along the platform

== Description ==
The brick main station building is of a type 4 standard roadside design with a brick platform, and was completed in 1884. The landscaping around the platform and entrance and the station fences and signs are also heritage-listed.

== Heritage listing ==
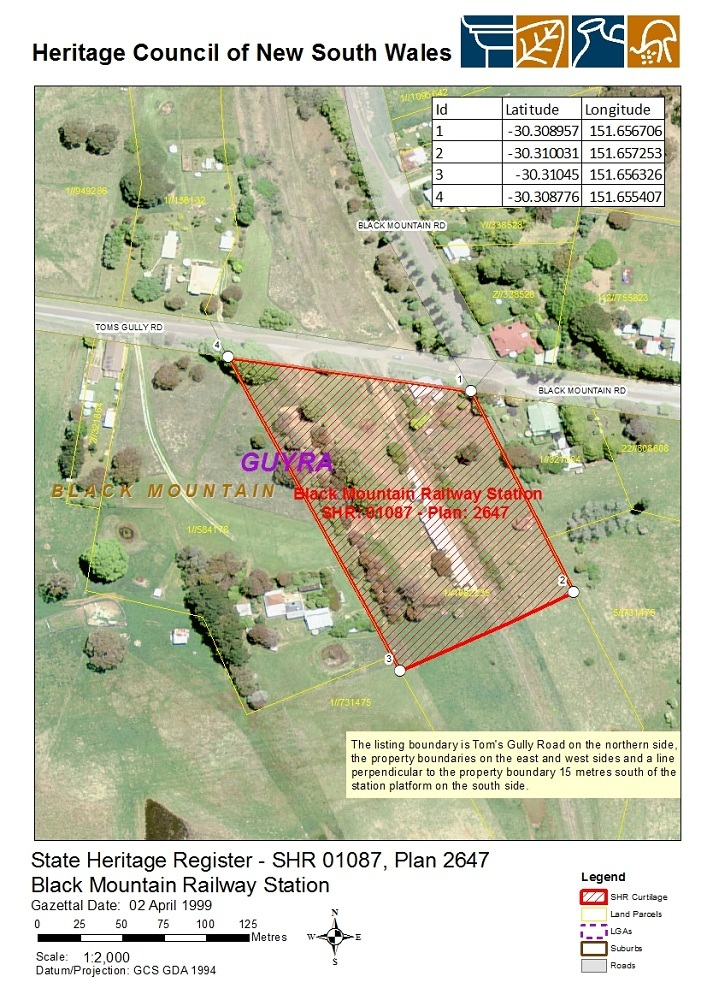
Heritage boundaries

Black Mountain station group is an intact station from the 1880s with a timber residence of unusual design (no longer owned by State Rail). The quality of the buildings marks the importance of the area in the pastoral development of the State and are an important and integral part of the townscape. This site illustrates the confidence in railway construction during the 1880s boom even in remote locations of the State.

Black Mountain railway station was listed on the New South Wales State Heritage Register on 2 April 1999 having satisfied the following criteria.

The place possesses uncommon, rare or endangered aspects of the cultural or natural history of New South Wales.

This item is assessed as historically rare. This item is assessed as arch. rare. This item is assessed as socially rare.

== See also ==
- List of disused regional railway stations in New South Wales
