= Ben Lomond railway station =

Ben Lomond
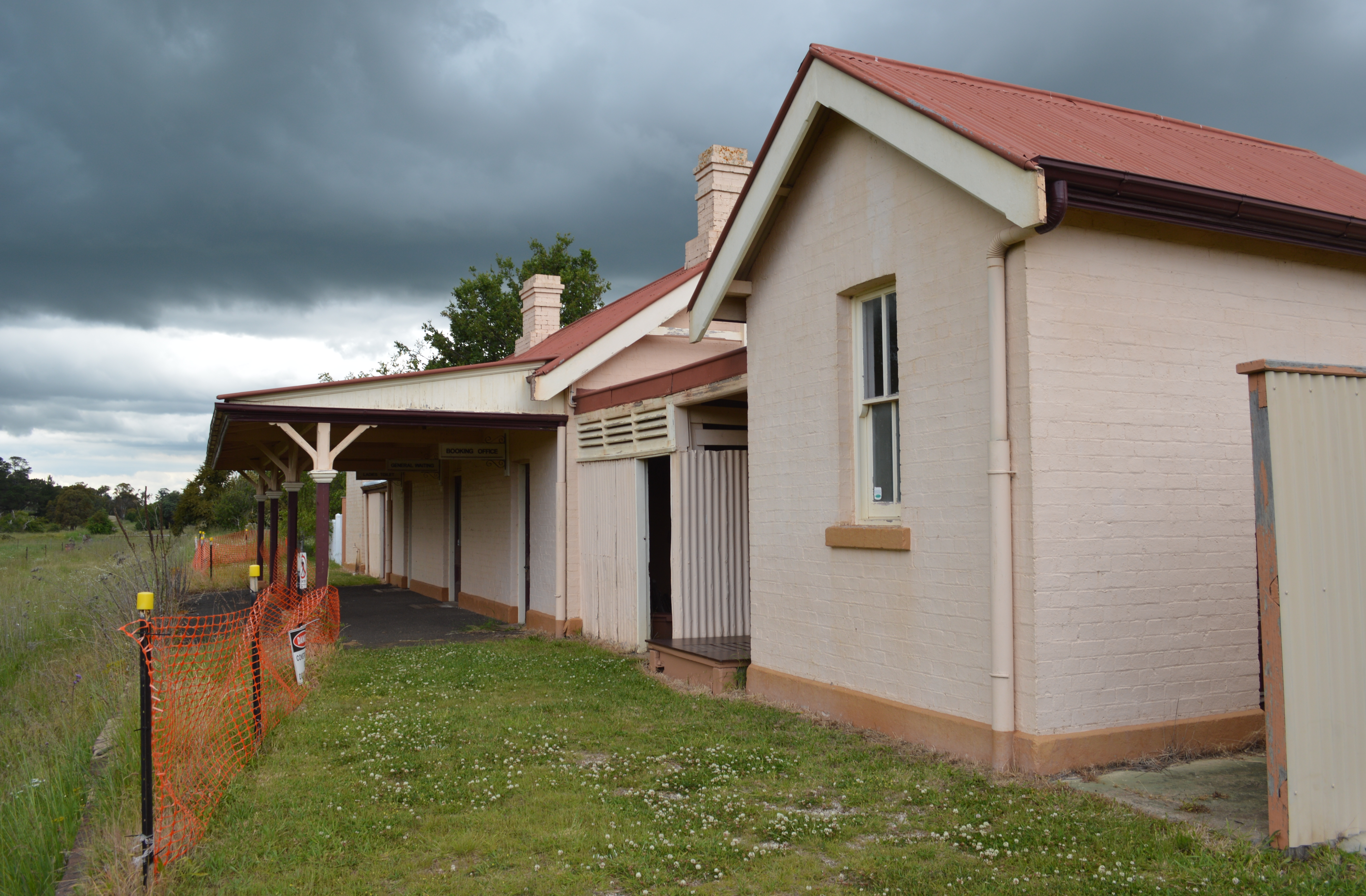
- The station building and platform remains in November 2017

General information
- Location: Ben Lomond Road, Ben Lomond; New South Wales; Australia
- Coordinates: 30.0199°S 151.6596°E
- Owner: Transport Asset Manager of NSW
- Operator: State Rail Authority
- Line: Main North
- Distance: 645.867 km (401.323 mi) from Central
- Platforms: 1 (1 side)
- Tracks: 1

Construction
- Structure type: Ground

Other information
- Status: Closed

History
- Opened: 19 August 1884 (142 years ago)
- Closed: 10 December 1985 (40 years ago)

Services
Preceding station	Former services	Following station
Glencoe towards Wallangarra	Main Northern Line	Guyra towards Sydney

New South Wales Heritage Register
- Official name: Ben Lomond Railway Station
- Type: state heritage (built)
- Designated: 2 April 1999
- Reference no.: 1083
- Type: Railway Platform/Station
- Category: Transport – Rail
- Builders: Nathan Cohen & Co
Location
- Location within New South Wales

Ben Lomond railway station is a heritage-listed disused regional railway station, located on the Main North line in the New England village of Ben Lomond. It was built in 1884 by Nathan Cohen & Co. The property was added to the New South Wales State Heritage Register on 2 April 1999.

== History ==
Settlement in the Ben Lomond area began in the 1840s and intensified in the 1860s and 1870s but it wasn't until the 1880s that a school opened (1881) and the railway arrived (1884). Construction of the railways in NSW commenced in the 1850s and by 1878 the Great Northern line had reached West Tamworth. The line continued north to the Queensland border via Uralla, Armidale, Glen Innes and Tenterfield. The Great Northern line reached Tamworth in 1880, Uralla (1881), Armidale (1883), Glen Innes (1884), Tenterfield (1886) and the border town of Wallangarra (originally 'Jennings') in 1888.

By 1881 construction of the Great Northern line had reached the Ben Lomond area and by 1883 construction reached its peak with hundreds of people employed on the project. The station building at Ben Lomond opened on 19 August 1884 and in the same year a twenty thousand gallon tank was installed. By 1885 a "receiving office" opened at the railway station and it was upgraded to a post office in 1886. During the late 19th century Ben Lomond station also provided additional community services including a telegraph service and banking facilities. During the mid-1880s the station is said to have been used for Anglican Church services before the erection of a chapel in 1897. The goods shed was used as a community hall until 1905. Other additions to the railway yard included a dam and an additional water tank installed between 1903 and 1905.

The mid-1920s were probably the heyday of railway activities at Ben Lomond when passenger journeys, freight tonnage and revenues all peaked. During both world wars, stations along the Great Northern line, including Ben Lomond, were closely associated with the movement of troops. Like many other locations, Ben Lomond and other stations on the northern line experienced a decline in the second half of the 20th century due primarily to the growth of road transportation (for both passengers and goods) but also as a result of competition from the coastal railway line between Sydney and Brisbane which had been in existence since the 1930s. In 1983 the goods shed was sold and removed and in December 1985, 101 years after its official opening, the station closed. Rail operations ceased along the Great Northern line in 1989 and in 1991 the Station Master's residence at Ben Lomond was sold.

== Description ==
The 2002 Conservation Management Plan for Ben Lomond Railway Station describes the arrangement of the station building as follows:

The passenger station comprises a central brick pavilion enclosing two waiting rooms and a ticket office for the Station Master, flanked by freestanding brick pavilions for the lamp room at the north end and toilets at the south end. The small yards between the pavilions were enclosed with corrugated iron screen walls and roofs. Each of the rooms was accessible from the 264 feet (88 m) long platform on the eastern side. A platform awning over the central portion across the width of the central pavilion provided shelter for passengers and platform equipment.

Other extant items within the railway precinct include the platform, weighbridge, fences and station signs.

The station building remains mostly intact but many items in the yard were removed in the late 20th century.

== Heritage listing ==
The railway station at Ben Lomond is significant as one of the smallest of the brick passenger stations constructed during a period of major expansion of the NSW railways in the 1880s. Excluding Skitube, the railway station is also significant as the highest railway station in NSW (1,363 m) and for its important historical role in the economic development and community life of Ben Lomond and surrounding districts (for many years it was the town's post office and was a place where the local community did their banking).

Ben Lomond Railway Station is a significant location on the former Great Northern railway line which, although now closed to rail traffic, was the only rail link between Queensland and the southern states in the late 19th century and early 20th century, and which was directly or indirectly associated with major historical events and themes, including for example the transportation of troops during wartime and the transportation of rural produce and livestock.

Ben Lomond railway station was listed on the New South Wales State Heritage Register on 2 April 1999 having satisfied the following criteria.

The place is important in demonstrating the course, or pattern, of cultural or natural history in New South Wales.

The impact of the Great Northern Railway on the New England region of NSW was substantial. It influenced the growth of towns and villages and it facilitated the establishment of new industries.

The construction of Ben Lomond Railway Station and the Great Northern Railway had an impact on the local community in many ways, including the loss of life in the construction of the railway and the opening of economic and social opportunities. For the local community the station was for some time an important centre for commercial activities including banking and postal services.

The place is important in demonstrating aesthetic characteristics and/or a high degree of creative or technical achievement in New South Wales.

Ben Lomond railway station is a good intact example of a modest late-Victorian passenger station at a minor country location on the former Great Northern line. The station building demonstrates some minor architectural pretensions and while similar in design to other comparable railway stations it also demonstrates subtle variations in design and construction.

The place has strong or special association with a particular community or cultural group in New South Wales for social, cultural or spiritual reasons.

Ben Lomond railway station was the principal meeting place and an important site for business transactions during the early development of the local community at Ben Lomond. Although railway services have ceased and the town has declined, the station building still remains a significant landmark in the local community.

The place has potential to yield information that will contribute to an understanding of the cultural or natural history of New South Wales.

The station does provide the potential to yield information about the early development of the local area, the operation of a small regional railway station and the decline of railway services in the New England region.

The place possesses uncommon, rare or endangered aspects of the cultural or natural history of New South Wales.

The earth toilets and open urinals may be the only remaining examples of their type at a railway station in NSW.

The place is important in demonstrating the principal characteristics of a class of cultural or natural places/environments in New South Wales.

The Ben Lomond railway precinct includes a good representative example of a late nineteenth-century station building.

== See also ==
- List of disused regional railway stations in New South Wales
