= Armidale railway station turntable =

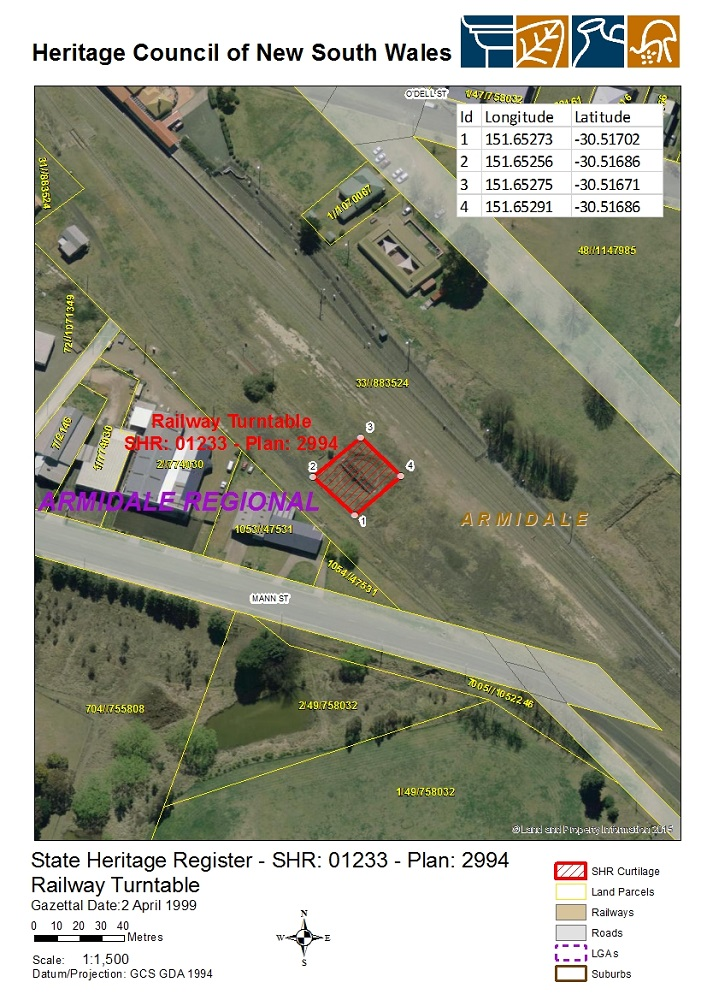
- Heritage boundaries

- Location within New South Wales Location within Australia
- 30.5169°S 151.6527°E
- Location: 216 Brown Street, Armidale, Armidale Regional Council, New South Wales, Australia

Site notes
- Owner: Transport Asset Manager of New South Wales

New South Wales Heritage Register
- Official name: Railway Turntable; Armidale Railway Station Turntable
- Type: state heritage (built)
- Designated: 2 April 1999
- Reference no.: 1233
- Type: Railway Turntable
- Category: Transport – Rail

Armidale railway station turntable is a heritage-listed railway turntable at 216 Brown Street, Armidale, in the New England region of New South Wales, Australia. The property is owned by the Transport Asset Manager (State Government). It was added to the New South Wales State Heritage Register on 2 April 1999.

== Heritage listing ==
Railway Turntable was listed on the New South Wales State Heritage Register on 2 April 1999.
