= Dumaresq, New South Wales =

Dumaresq New South Wales
- Coordinates: 30°27′42″S 151°34′51″E
- Population: 77 (2016 census)
- Established: 1884
- Postcode(s): 2350
- LGA(s): Armidale Regional Council
- County: Sandon
- State electorate(s): Northern Tablelands
- Federal division(s): New England

Dumaresq is a town in the Northern Tablelands, New South Wales, Australia. It is located approximately 20 km north-west of Armidale, on Boorolong Road. The local council is Armidale Regional Council, it once belonged to Dumaresq Shire, and then Armidale Dumaresq Shire. The town is located within Sandon County.

The Great Northern Railway reached Dumaresq in 1884. The passenger station at Dumaresq opened as "Inverella" in 1884, with the name changing to "Eversleigh" in 1885 and finally "Dumaresq" in 1889. Trains no longer go through Dumaresq, as the line is closed north of Armidale.

== Heritage listings ==
Dumaresq has a heritage-listed site:

- 537 Dumaresq Road: Dumaresq railway station
