= Roseneath, Armidale =

Roseneath
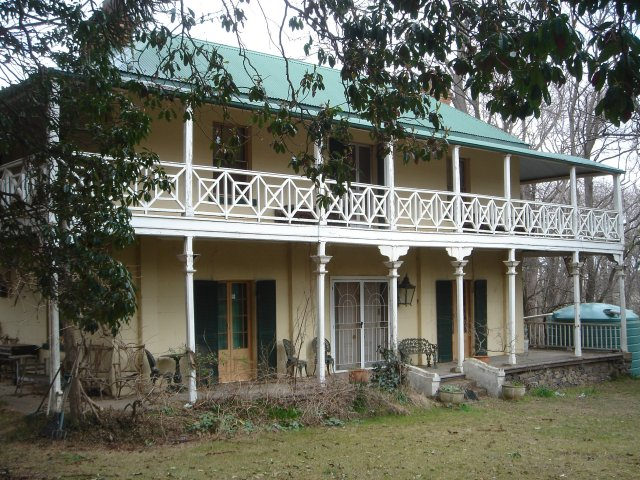

- Location within New South Wales Location within Australia
- 30.5437°S 151.6697°E
- Location: 36 Roseneath Lane, Armidale, Armidale Regional Council, New South Wales, Australia

New South Wales Heritage Register
- Official name: Roseneath
- Type: state heritage (built)
- Designated: 2 April 1999
- Reference no.: 63
- Type: House
- Category: Residential buildings (private)
- Builders: Thomas Lamb

Roseneath is a heritage-listed residence at 36 Roseneath Lane, Armidale, Armidale Regional Council, New South Wales, Australia. It was built by Thomas Lamb. It was added to the New South Wales State Heritage Register on 2 April 1999.

== History ==
Thomas Lamb, the first Town Clerk of Armidale, was granted 24 acres of land in May 1854. On this land in the same year he built a two-storey home for himself and called it Roseneath.

Thomas Lamb later sold Roseneath to John McNeill Simpson, surveyor of Barraba. In 1866 Simpson bought other land grants and extended the Roseneath property to 144 acres.

In 1877 Roseneath was bought by Agnes Scott of Surveyor's Creek, near Walcha. Following the marriage of her granddaughter Marion Glas Connal to John Adam McDonald, Solicitor and Notary Public of Armidale, Roseneath became the McDonald family home 1879 to 1966. Adeline and Edwin were the two eldest children.

In 1966 the owners Adeline Marion and Edwin John Scott McDonald subdivided the original 24 acres to form a 4-acre block containing the house, outbuildings and garden and a 20-acre block to be retained by the vendor. In 1967 Mr and Mrs Henderson purchased the 4 acre block and subsequently began restoring Roseneath.

In 1978 a proposal to construct a new premises beside the historic two-storey building, for the purpose of selling antique furniture from a gallery was referred to the Heritage and Conservation Branch for comment. Two different sets of proposals were considered, both of which were found to significantly impact upon the significance of Roseneath. To ensure the new buildings would be erected in a sympathetic manner with respect to the house, garden and outbuildings an Interim Conservation Order was recommended.

On 27 October 1978 an Interim Conservation Order was placed over the property.

In November 1978, the Heritage Council approved the construction of a gallery for antiques and furniture restoration workshop at the rear of Roseneath.

A Permanent Conservation Order was placed over Roseneath on 20 March 1981.

On 2 April 1999 Roseneath was transferred to the State Heritage Register.

== Description ==
Roseneath is a Colonial Georgian style residence of rendered brick construction on basalt foundation. Roseneath has a central main entrance of heavy double doors framed by multi-coloured venetian glass, balanced by symmetrically placed eight pane French doors. The first floor verandah has light cross-braced timber balustrade. The interior features a cedar stair, hallway with excellent joinery.

The house is set in a formal garden, contemporary with the house and featuring two bunya-bunya pines (Araucaria bidwillii) and Sierra redwood /big tree (Sequoiadendron giganteum, syn. Wellingtonia)s, elms (Ulmus sp.) and wisteria, with tiled walks.

Associated outbuildings include a smokehouse, outhouse and the stables. The stables are of random masonry construction with a wooden style roof overlaid with galvanised iron.

== Heritage listing ==
Roseneath is a Colonial Georgian style residence built by Thomas Lamb, the first Town Clerk of Armidale, in 1854. Roseneath is reputed to be the oldest substantial home in the immediate environs of Armidale and is unique to the area. It is a fine example of its type and period and includes a formal garden and outbuildings.

Roseneath was listed on the New South Wales State Heritage Register on 2 April 1999 having satisfied the following criteria.

The place is important in demonstrating the course, or pattern, of cultural or natural history in New South Wales.

Roseneath is a Colonial Georgian style residence built by Thomas Lamb, the first Town Clerk of Armidale, in 1854. Roseneath is reputed to be the oldest substantial home in the immediate environs of Armidale and is unique to the area.

The place is important in demonstrating aesthetic characteristics and/or a high degree of creative or technical achievement in New South Wales.

Roseneath is a fine example of its type and period and includes a formal garden and outbuildings.
