= Guyra railway station =

Railway station in Guyra, New South Wales, Australia

Guyra
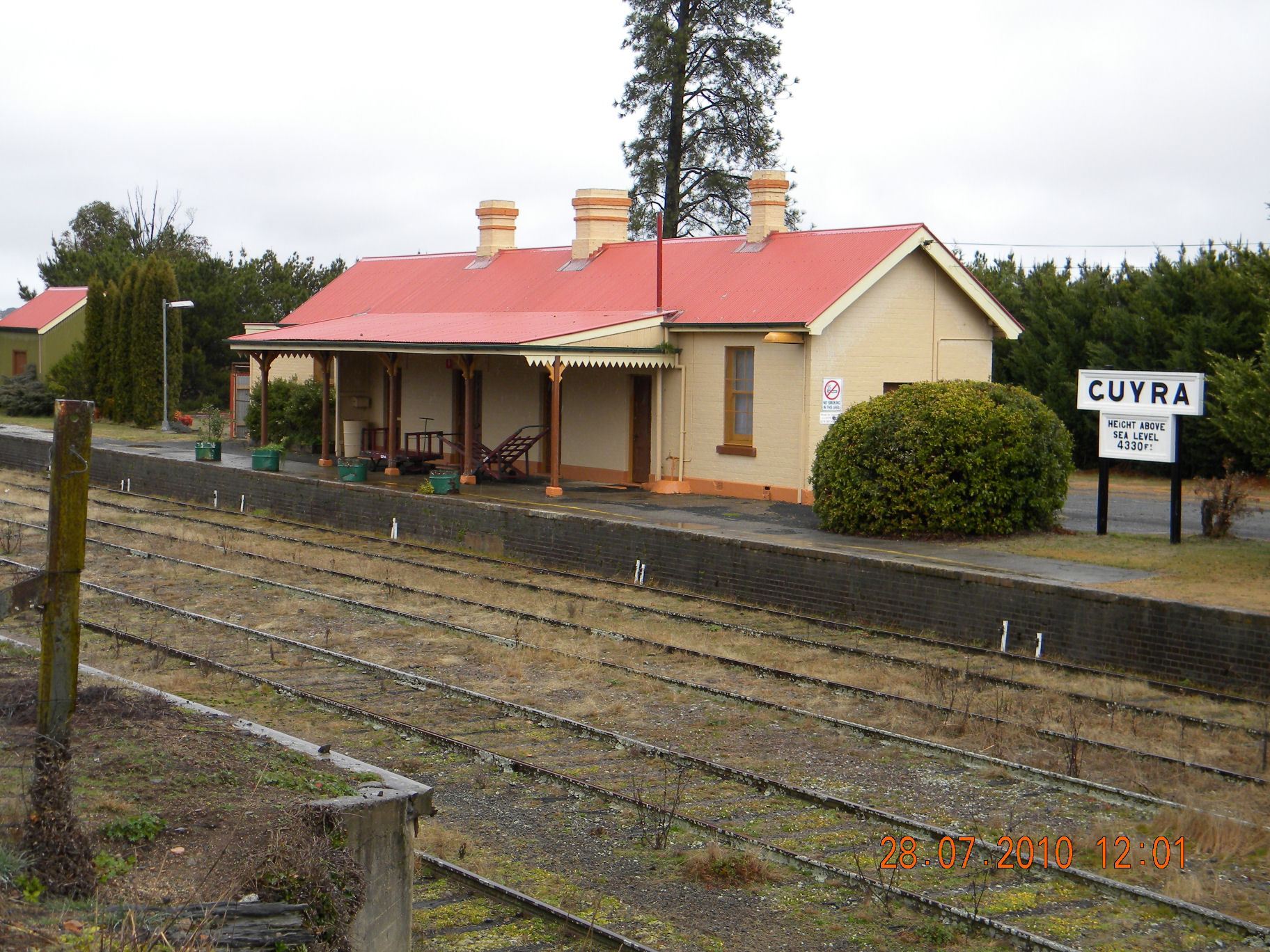
- View of the station building and restored station sign

General information
- Location: Lagoon Road, Guyra; New South Wales; Australia
- Coordinates: 30.2287°S 151.6709°E
- Owner: Transport Asset Manager of New South Wales
- Operator: State Rail Authority
- Line: Main North
- Distance: 621.80 km (386.37 mi) from Central
- Platforms: 1 (1 side)
- Tracks: 1

Construction
- Structure type: Ground

Other information
- Status: Closed

History
- Opened: 19 August 1884 (142 years ago)

Services
| Preceding station | Former services | Following station |
|---|---|---|
| Ben Lomond towards Wallangarra | Main Northern Line | Black Mountain towards Sydney |

New South Wales Heritage Register
- Official name: Guyra Railway Station group
- Type: state heritage (complex / group)
- Designated: 2 April 1999
- Reference no.: 1163
- Type: Railway Platform/Station
- Category: Transport – Rail
Location
- Location within New South Wales

Guyra railway station is a heritage-listed former railway station and now machinery museum located on the Main Northern railway line, serving the town of Guyra in New England, New South Wales. The property was added to the New South Wales State Heritage Register on 2 April 1999.

== History ==
Guyra station opened on 19 August 1884. The line through Guyra closed in 1989.

The station complex now houses the Guyra Antique Machinery Museum, housing historical railway objects, antique machinery and police memorabilia. The complex received $28,000 in state government funding for preservation works in 2017.

== Description ==
The station complex includes a type 4 standard roadside third-class brick station building with a brick-faced platform (completed in 1884), a type 3 timber skillion roofed signal box (completed in 1918) and a type 3 60' x 16' corrugated iron goods shed (including office) designed as a side shed with awning (completed in 1884). Jib crane No. 429 remains on the station platform.

== Heritage listing ==
Guyra station group is part of a group of mid-Victorian stations built on the main north line between Tamworth and the border that represent the most intact group of buildings in the State from this period. These form an important group of examples demonstrating the various size and form of structures used at varying sites, and so have high significance.

Guyra railway station was listed on the New South Wales State Heritage Register on 2 April 1999 having satisfied the following criteria.

The place possesses uncommon, rare or endangered aspects of the cultural or natural history of New South Wales.

This item is assessed as historically rare. This item is assessed as arch. rare. This item is assessed as socially rare.
