= Wandsworth, New South Wales =

Wandsworth
- Town
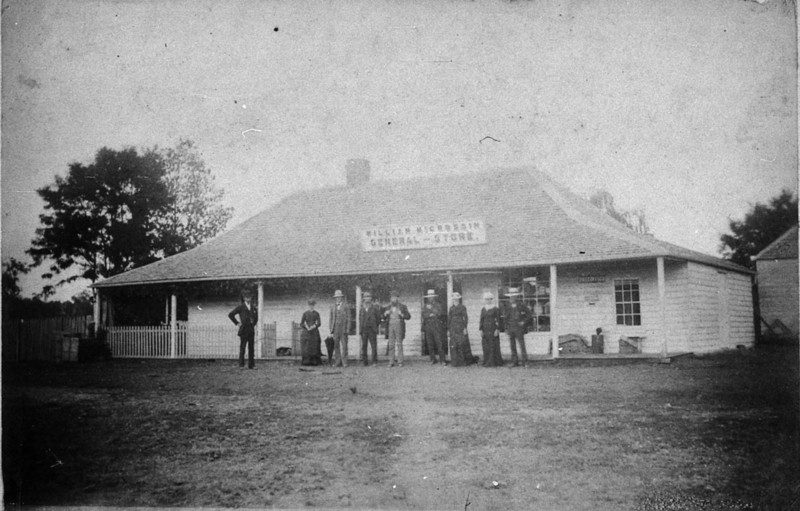
- General store, Wandsworth

- Coordinates: 30°04′S 151°31′E
- Country: Australia
- State: New South Wales
- LGA: Armidale Regional Council
- Location: 572 km (355 mi) N of Sydney; 63 km (39 mi) N of Armidale; 25 km (16 mi) NW of Guyra; 54 km (34 mi) S of Glen Innes

Government
  - State electorate: Northern Tablelands
  - Federal division: New England
- Elevation: 1,400 m (4,600 ft)

Population
  - Total: 80 (2006 census)
- Postcode: 2365
- County: Hardinge
- Parish: Ollera

Wandsworth is a locality on the Northern Tablelands in the New England region of New South Wales, Australia.

This locality is situated at the junction of Guyra and Wandsworth Roads, 63 kilometres north of Armidale and 54 km south of Glen Innes. It is in Armidale Regional Council local government area, with part of the surrounding district in Inverell Shire. Wandsworth is situated at approximately 1,100 metres elevation and has Limestone Creek passing nearby.

== History ==
Wandsworth was so named after the English counterpart in London. The name was originally used here for a squatting run in the Pastoral District of New England. In 1838 John and George Everett had taken up the Ollera run in the same area and later with Francis Halhed, they occupied Wandsworth Station. The station by 1850 was carrying 7,250 sheep, 1,150 cattle and 250 horses. A decade later, it carried 12,000 sheep, 2,000 cattle and 400 horses.

Ollera became essentially a semi-autonomous village with its own bakery, post office, store, bank, school (1862) and church. Masons, journeymen, farriers, shepherds, jobbers, stockmen, sheep shearers, carpenters and their families were all resident employees with their own houses. There was a medical fund and an amateur theatrical group. A cricket pitch (still in use) had been established by 1862 and it was the venue for a match with a touring English team in 1885. A wool scouring works was set up in 1895. Ollera Post Office opened on 1 July 1870, was renamed Wandsworth the same year and closed in 1968.

In 1876-77 St Bartholomew's Church, was built on Ollera Road, Wandsworth for use by both the Anglican, and Presbyterian religions, on land which had been donated by Ollera Station. This church and Ollera Station have now been listed on the Register of the National Estate.

The Ollera Cemetery is one of the earliest cemeteries in the New England Region, believed to have commenced in 1843. Although now closed to general burials, it is still available to descendants of the original owners, and depicts the life of the early pioneers of the area.

== Present day ==
At the 2006 census, the census area around Wandsworth had a recorded population of 80 of which 52.5% were males and 47.5% females. The region had 24 families and 64 private dwellings (which includes unoccupied private dwellings).

The district's primary industries are agriculture, with that being mostly dedicated to sheep and beef cattle breeding.
