= Glencoe, New South Wales =

Town in New South Wales, Australia

Glencoe
- Town
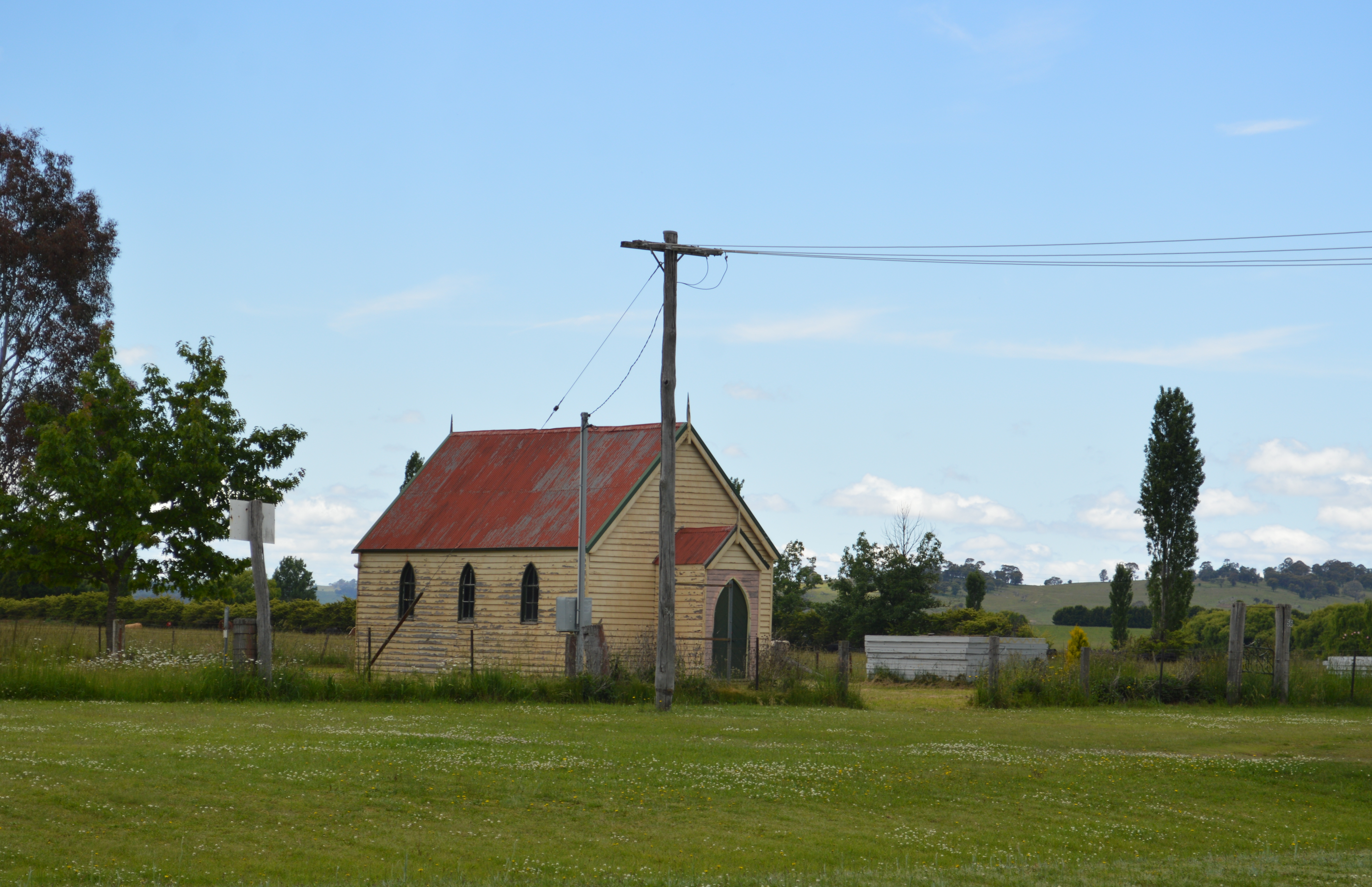

- Coordinates: 29.929°S 151.726°E
- Country: Australia
- State: New South Wales
- LGA: Glen Innes Severn Council
- Location: 22 km (14 mi) s of Glen Innes.

Government
  - State electorate: Northern Tablelands
  - Federal division: New England
- Elevation: 1,150 m (3,770 ft)

Population
  - Total: 192 (2016 census)
- Postcode: 2365

Glencoe is a village on the Northern Tablelands, New South Wales, Australia. It is part of the Glen Innes Severn Shire Council local government area. It has an elevation of about 1,150 metres (3,770 ft). At the 2016 census, Glencoe had a population of 192 people.

Glencoe is located on the New England Highway around 22 kilometres (14 mi) south of Glen Innes. The Main North railway line (now closed) had a platform and sidings, opened 1884, closed 1975.

The Red Lion Tavern is located there with a display of artworks and other memorabilia. Bellevue Cottage Gallery and Cafe has a range of crafts and cottage goods from the surrounding district. The historic Uniting Church there is over 100 years old. A sports ground is located on the northern side of the village, along with a fossicking area, to the south, on the creek. Here it may be possible to find sapphires or zircons. The Red Lion has re-opened since November 2011.

Glencoe was named by early European settlers after Glencoe, Scotland. The main industry of the area is sheep and beef cattle breeding with some mining and a vineyard.

== Media ==
Local news coverage is provided by Glen Innes News which publishes online as well as in print.

Glencoe is served by community radio station 2CBD FM which broadcasts from studios in Glen Innes.

Preceding station	Former services	Following station
Stonehenge towards Wallangarra	Main Northern Line	Ben Lomond towards Sydney
