= Armidale Post Office =

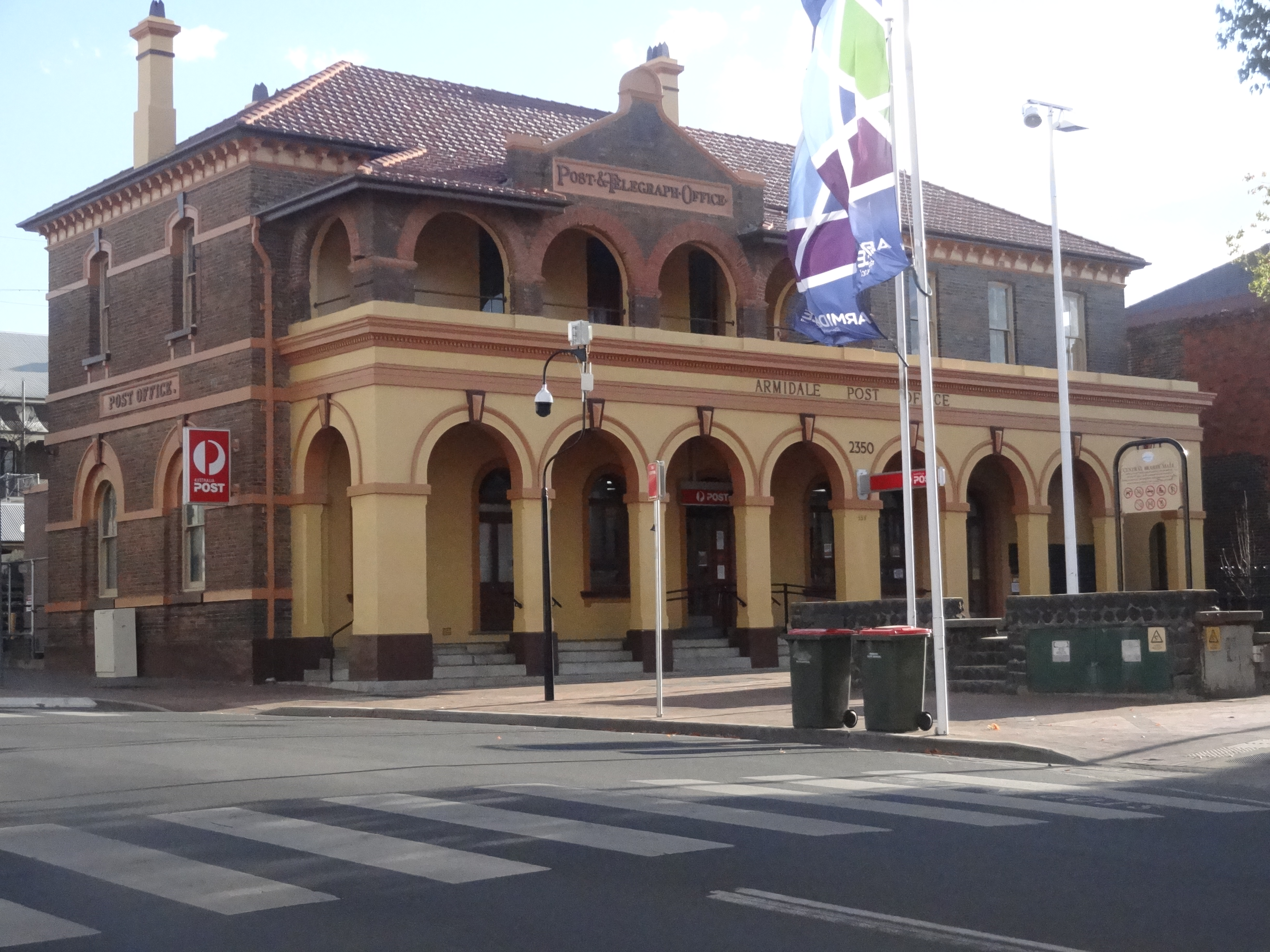

- Location within New South Wales Location within Australia
- 30.5397°S 151.6803°E
- Location: 158 Beardy Street, Armidale, Armidale Regional Council, New South Wales, Australia

History
- Built: 1880

Site notes
- Architects: NSW Colonial Architect's Office under: James Barnet (main construction in 1880); Walter Liberty Vernon (facade/logia in 1897)
- Architectural styles: Victorian Free Classical; Federation Queen Anne; Federation Arts and Crafts
- Owner: Australia Post

New South Wales Heritage Register
- Official name: Armidale Post Office
- Type: State heritage (built)
- Designated: 17 December 1999
- Reference no.: 1312
- Type: Post office
- Category: Postal and telecommunications
- Builders: W. Seabrook and J. T. Brown

Commonwealth Heritage List
- Official name: Armidale Post Office
- Type: Listed place (Historic)
- Designated: 8 November 2011
- Reference no.: 105493

The Armidale Post Office is a heritage-listed post office located at 158 Beardy Street, Armidale, in the New England region of New South Wales, Australia. The post office building was designed by the NSW Colonial Architect's Office under the direction of James Barnet and, subsequently, Walter Liberty Vernon and built in 1880 by W. Seabrook and J. T. Brown, with additions completed in 1897. The property is owned by Australia Post. The property was added to the New South Wales State Heritage Register on 17 December 1999 and to the Australian Commonwealth Heritage List on 8 November 2011.

== History ==
Armidale's first post office was established in 1843. The first official post office premises were erected in 1865 on another site.

The current post office was completed on 21 May 1880, under the direction of James Barnet, as premises for the post office and divisional manager. The builders were W. Seabrook and J. T. Brown. Minor alterations and repairs were carried out in 1891 and 1894. The Federation Queen Anne style loggia was added in 1897 by Walter Liberty Vernon, with first-floor extensions to the loggia added in 1917. Further modifications were made in 1929, 1938 and 1979–80.

== Description ==
Located on a prominent corner site, the post office is a symmetrical two-storey brick building with a hipped roof and projecting stuccoed single-storey arched loggia. The side elevation has cement rendered banding. A corner addition above the loggia has a hipped roof extended from the bracketed eaves, wide brick-arched window openings, a Dutch gable and Federation Arts and Crafts lettering in cast cement.

=== Condition ===
It was reported to be in good physical condition as of 1 July 1999. Although the building has had numerous modifications the integrity of the original palazzo form with 1897 Queen Anne loggia, remains visually intact.

=== Modifications and dates ===
Minor alterations and repairs were carried out in 1891 and 1894. The Queen Anne style loggia was added 1897 with first-floor extensions over the loggia added in 1917. Further modifications were made in 1929, 1938 and 1979–80, details of these are not known.

== Heritage listing ==
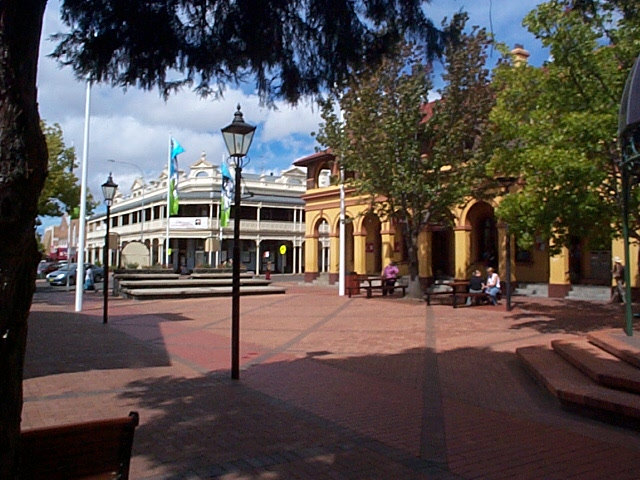
Armidale City Centre with post office to the right, 2005

The Armidale Post Office is associated with the historical development of the town's civic core and is part of an important precinct centred on the Beardy/Faulkner Streets intersection. It is also associated with Colonial Architects Barnet and Vernon who both contributed to the present appearance of the building. An outstanding public building on a key corner site. The building itself is unusual in combining a Victorian Free Classical palazzo form with an attached stuccoed loggia. As a prominent civic building in a historic precinct, the Armidale Post Office is considered to be significant to the Armidale community's sense of place.

Armidale Post Office was listed on the New South Wales State Heritage Register on 17 December 1999 having satisfied the following criteria.

The place is important in demonstrating the course, or pattern, of cultural or natural history in New South Wales.

The Armidale Post Office is associated with the historical development of the town's civic core. The post office is associated with colonial architect James Barnet, under whose direction the original building was designed and built, and with government architect W. L. Vernon, during whose office the Federation period Queen Anne style loggia was added.

The place is important in demonstrating aesthetic characteristics and/or a high degree of creative or technical achievement in New South Wales.

An outstanding public building on a key corner site, the Armidale Post Office is part of an important historic precinct centred on the Beardy/Faulkner Streets intersection. The post office is aesthetically similar to many of the adjoining buildings resulting in a particular streetscape harmony. It relates exceptionally well to No.164, adjoining, and the Court House opposite. The building is unusual in combining a Free Classical palazzo form with an attached stuccoed loggia. The loggia compares with that on the post office at Narrabri (1879) and possibly that at Richmond (1875) but is enriched by upper-level additions with the Dutch gable motif.

The place has a strong or special association with a particular community or cultural group in New South Wales for social, cultural or spiritual reasons.

As a prominent civic building in a historic precinct, the Armidale Post Office is considered to be significant to the Armidale community's sense of place.

The place has potential to yield information that will contribute to an understanding of the cultural or natural history of New South Wales.

The site has the potential to contain an archaeological resource, which may provide information relating to the previous use of the site, and to use by the post office.

The place possesses uncommon, rare or endangered aspects of the cultural or natural history of New South Wales.

The Armidale Post Office is a fine building with a unique relationship to its urban context.

The place is important in demonstrating the principal characteristics of a class of cultural or natural places/environments in New South Wales.

Part of the group of NSW post offices that are representative of the work of Barnet and Vernon.
