= Lands Board Office, Armidale =

Lands Board Office
- Location within New South Wales Location within Australia
- 30.5141°S 151.6668°E
- Location: 108 Faulkner Street, Armidale, Armidale Regional Council, New South Wales, Australia

History
- Built: 1887–1887

Site notes
- Architect: James Barnet
- Owner: Department of Planning and Infrastructure

New South Wales Heritage Register
- Official name: Lands Board Office
- Type: state heritage (built)
- Designated: 2 April 1999
- Reference no.: 963
- Type: Other - Government & Administration
- Category: Government and Administration

The Lands Board Office is a heritage-listed former government office at 108 Faulkner Street, Armidale, Armidale Regional Council, New South Wales, Australia. It was designed by James Barnet and built in 1887. The property is owned by the Department of Planning and Infrastructure (State Government). It was added to the New South Wales State Heritage Register on 2 April 1999.

== History ==
The Armidale Lands Office was built in 1887 to a design from the Office of Colonial Architect, James Barnet. The establishment of the Lands Office for New England district after the new Lands Act of 1884 was controversial. On the recommendation of Lands Minister, James Farnell, a new Lands Office was set up in Glen Innes in January 1885. As a great proportion of the cases that the Land Board was handling were from the Armidale and Walcha districts, far from Glen Innes, petitions were presented and public meetings called to relocate the Land Office. Following a review in 1886, it was announced that the Lands Office would open in Armidale on 1 February 1887. (DLWC S170 Register)

== Description ==
The building is an impressive two storey Victorian public building built of face brickwork laid in English bond. It is surrounded by an elaborate and elegant verandah with corrugated steel roofing to balcony over. The balustrading and columns are of cast iron with curved timber roof forms and trussed balcony beams. Six tall chimneys dominate the simple corrugated iron (originally slate) roof form with ridge roof vents. (DLWC S170 Register)

=== Modifications and dates ===
The building was renovated in 1974–75. The slate roof was replaced with corrugated steel in 1975. (DLWC S170 Register)

== Heritage listing ==
The building is a superbly crafted and designed Victorian public building. It is surrounded by others of the same period of town growth such as the Armidale Folk Museum, the Imperial Hotel and the Post Office, forming part of the Armidale Conservation Area. (DLWC S170 Register)

The Lands Board Office was listed on the New South Wales State Heritage Register on 2 April 1999.
