= Black Mountain, New South Wales =

Black Mountain
- Town
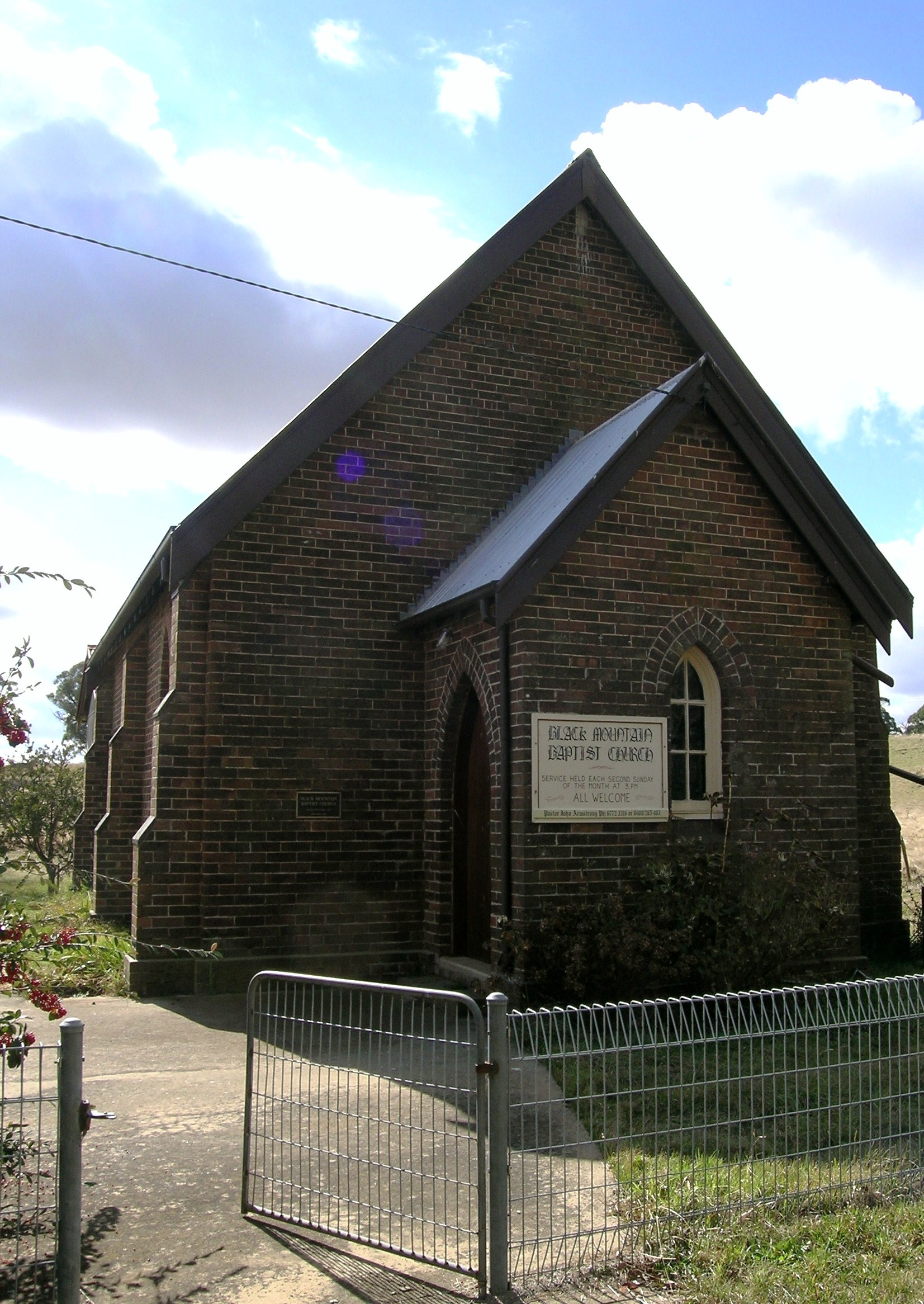
- Baptist Church, Black Mountain

- Coordinates: 30.3125327°S 151.6601925°E
- Country: Australia
- State: New South Wales
- Region: Northern Tablelands
- LGA: Armidale Regional Council
- Location: 539 km (335 mi) N of Sydney; 29 km (18 mi) N of Armidale; 11 km (6.8 mi) S of Guyra

Government
  - State electorate: Northern Tablelands
  - Federal division: New England
- Elevation: 1,312 m (4,304 ft)

Population
  - Total: 310 (2016 census)
- Time zone: UTC+10 (AEST)
  - Summer (DST): UTC+11 (AEDT)
- Postcode: 2365
- County: Sandon
- Parish: Tilbuster
- Mean max temp: 17.6 °C (63.7 °F)
- Mean min temp: 6.5 °C (43.7 °F)
- Annual rainfall: 907.4 mm (35.72 in)

Black Mountain is a village situated between Armidale and Guyra, located on the Northern Tablelands in the New England region of New South Wales, Australia. Situated within Armidale Regional Council, as at the 2016 census, Black Mountain had a population of 310.

== Features and location ==
Located on a volcanic uplift of the Northern Tablelands, the town is one of the highest in Australia at about 1,312 metres (4,304 ft) above sea level. The New England Highway is the main transport link to Armidale. The Northern Railway tracks still pass through the village, but this section of the line, north of Armidale, is now disused.

Black Mountain village exists in two sections. Located on the New England Highway is the Black Mountain Roadhouse and motel at the top of notorious Devil's Pinch, which is subject to snow falls that close the road. This marks the turn off into Black Mountain proper, a drive of 3 kilometres (1.9 mi).

The Black Mountain area was a well known haunt of Captain Thunderbolt. One of his hideout caves is located 200 metres (660 ft) to the south of the roadhouse.

Sheep and beef cattle breeding is the main industry of the area.

Black Mountain Baptist Church was built there in 1902 and restored in 1992. Black Mountain has a public school and nursery which is the home of the award-winning three point linkage Youman Tree Planter machine and services. Booroolong Railway Station Post Office opened on 8 December 1884, was renamed Black Mountain around 1886 and closed in 1985.

== Heritage listings ==
Black Mountain has a number of heritage-listed sites, including:

- Main Northern railway: Black Mountain railway station

== See also ==
- Little Nymboida River
- Nymboida River
