= Armidale Regional Council =

Armidale Region
- Local government area
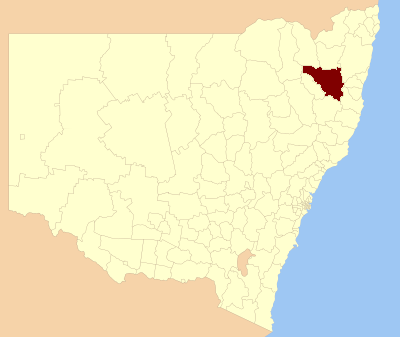
- Location in New South Wales

- Interactive map of Armidale Region
- Coordinates: 30°30′S 151°40′E
- Country: Australia
- State: New South Wales
- Region: New England
- Established: 2016
- Council seat: Armidale

Government
  - Mayor: Sam Coupland (Independent)
  - State electorate: Northern Tablelands
  - Federal division: New England

Area
  - Total: 8,621 km^{2} (3,329 sq mi)

Population
  - Total: 30,707 (2018)
  - Density: 3.56188/km^{2} (9.2252/sq mi)
- Website: Armidale Region
LGAs around Armidale Region
Inverell Shire	Glen Innes Severn	Clarence Valley
Uralla	Armidale Region	Bellingen
Uralla	Walcha	Kempsey

The Armidale Region is a local government area in the New England and Northern Tablelands regions of New South Wales, Australia. This area was formed in 2016 from the merger of the Armidale Dumaresq Shire with the surrounding Guyra Shire.

The combined area covered the urban area of Armidale and the surrounding region, extending primarily eastward from the city through farming districts to the gorges and escarpments that mark the edge of the Northern Tablelands.

The Armidale Region is administered by the Armidale Regional Council.

The mayor of the Armidale Region is Sam Coupland, an independent politician.

== History ==
On 1 July 2019, Tingha was transferred from Armidale Region to Inverell Shire.

== Towns, villages and other locations ==
In addition to the main centre of Armidale and the town of Guyra, the villages located in the area include Ben Lomond, Black Mountain, Dangarsleigh, Ebor, Hillgrove, Kellys Plains, Llangothlin, and Wollomombi.

Oban is a rural location covering 72.607 km^{2} (28.034 sq mi) within the Armidale Regional LGA, with 7 residents.

== Heritage listings ==
The Armidale Region has a number of heritage-listed sites, including the following sites in Armidale:

- 158 Beardy Street: Armidale Post Office
- 164 Beardy Street: Commercial Bank of Australia Building
- 216 Brown Street: Armidale railway station turntable
- 234 Brown Street: Armidale railway station
- 125 Dangar Street: Central Park, Armidale
- 132 Dangar Street: Saints Mary and Joseph Catholic Cathedral
- 108 Faulkner Street: Lands Board Office
- 60 Madgwick Drive: Booloominbah
- 122–132 Mossman Street: Old Teachers' College
- 36 Roseneath Lane: Roseneath
- 122 Rusden Street: St Peter's Cathedral
- 230 Saumarez Road: Saumarez Homestead
- High Conservation Value Old Growth forest

== Demographics ==
Selected historical census data for the Armidale Region
Census year		2016
Population	Estimated residents on census night	29,449
Population	LGA rank in terms of size within New South Wales	60th
Population	% of New South Wales population	0.39%
Population	% of Australian population	0.13%
Cultural and language diversity		
Ancestry, top responses	Australian	30.4%
Ancestry, top responses	English	28.8%
Ancestry, top responses	Irish	9.8%
Ancestry, top responses	Scottish	8.4%
Ancestry, top responses	German	3.4%
Language, top responses (other than English)	Mandarin	1.1%
Language, top responses (other than English)	Arabic	1.0%
Language, top responses (other than English)	Nepali	0.5%
Language, top responses (other than English)	German	0.4%
Language, top responses (other than English)	French	0.2%
Religious affiliation		
Religious affiliation, top responses	No religion	27.4%
Religious affiliation, top responses	Anglican	22.8%
Religious affiliation, top responses	Catholic	20.2%
Religious affiliation, top responses	Presbyterian	4.5%
Median weekly incomes		
Personal income	Median weekly personal income	A$561
Personal income	% of Australian median income	84.7%
Family income	Median weekly family income	A$1465
Family income	% of Australian median income	84.5%
Household income	Median weekly household income	A$1173
Household income	% of Australian median income	81.6%

== Council ==
Armidale Regional Council is composed of nine councillors elected proportionally as a single ward. All councillors are elected for a fixed four-year term of office. The mayor is elected by the councillors at the first meeting of the council. The most recent election was held on 14 September 2024, and the makeup of the council is as follows:

Party	Councillors
Team Coupland Group	4
Independents	2
Independent Liberal	1
Greens	1
Labor	1
Total	9

The current council, in order of election, is:

Councillor	Party	Notes
Susan McMichael	Labor	
Sam Coupland	Independent	Team Coupland Group
Todd Redwood	Independent	Team Coupland Group
Paul Gaddes	Independent	Team Coupland Group
Kay Endres	Independent	Team Coupland Group
Dorothy Robinson	Greens	
Eli Imad	Independent Liberal	
Rod Taber	Independent	
Bradley Widders	Independent	

== Election results ==
=== 2024 ===
2024 New South Wales local elections: Armidale
Party	Candidate	Votes	%	±%
Vote 1 Growth	1. Sam Coupland (elected); 2. Todd Redwood (elected); 3. Paul Gaddes (elected); 4. Kay Endres (elected); 5. Jane Mactier; 6. Jane Schmude; 7. Melanie Fillios; 8. Jon Galletly	7,528	48.27	+48.27
Labor	1. Susan McMichael (elected); 2. Caroline Chapman; 3. Debra O'Brien; 4. Yvonne Langenberg; 5. Lisa Ward	1,904	12.21	−3.29
Independent Regional Alliance	1. Eli Imad (elected); 2. Rob Lenehan; 3. Peter Heagney; 4. Robert Jackson; 5. Jypsi Hooper	1,543	9.89	+9.89
Greens	1. Dorothy Robinson (elected); 2. Elizabeth O'Hara; 3. Pat Schulz; 4. Gayle Davies; 5. Gay (Alice) Cairns	1,504	9.64	−1.26
Community First Independents	1. Rob Taber (elected); 2. Rob Richardson; 3. Siri Gamage; 4. Josephine Newberry; 5. Andy Berriman	1,042	6.68	+6.68
Independent	Bradley Widders (elected)	589	3.78	−0.32
Margaret O'Connor's Team	1. Margaret O'Connor; 2. Brian Flint; 3. Kerry Moran; 4. Bruce Newberry; 5. Deni McKenzie; 6. Janet Edmonds	540	3.46	−10.94
Independent	Jenny Wild	450	2.89	+2.89
Independent	Joshua Fittler	230	1.47	+1.47
Independent	Madank Narayanamurthy	180	1.15	+1.15
Independent	Natasha Ledger	85	0.55	+0.55
Total formal votes		15,595	94.36	
Informal votes		933	5.64	
Turnout		16,528		

=== 2021 ===
2021 New South Wales local elections: Armidale
Party	Candidate	Votes	%	±%
Labor	1. Debra O'Brien (elected); 2. Susan McMichael (elected); 3. Caroline Chapman; 4. Yvonne Langenberg; 5. April Youngberry; 6. Margaret Finley	2,352	15.5	+4.5
Team Margaret and Gordon	1. Margaret O'Connor (Ind. Lib) (elected); 2. Gordon Cope; 3. Bruce Newberry; 4. Janet Edmonds; 5. Ju Denton; 6. Trevor Esplin	2,196	14.4	+3.1
Independent	Sam Coupland (elected)	1,897	12.5	
Greens	1. Dorothy Robinson (elected); 2. Elizabeth O'Hara; 3. Gaynor McGrath; 4. Richard Sheridan; 5. Pat Schultz; 6. Dora Koops	1,664	10.9	+3.4
Independent	Jon Galletly (elected)	1,139	7.5	
Independent	Steven Mepham (elected)	930	6.1	
Independent	Todd Redwood (elected)	852	5.6	
Independent	Paul Packham (elected)	728	4.8	
Independent	Bradley Widders (elected)	627	4.1	
Independent	Paul Gaddes (elected)	621	4.1	
Independent	Richard Robinson	598	3.9	
Independent	Callan Schaefer	466	3.1	
Independent	Kathleen Clare	416	2.7	
Independent	Peter Bailey	239	1.6	
Independent	Margaret Sims	224	1.5	
Independent	Phillip Blackmore	158	1.0	
Independent	Craig Pevitt	116	0.8	
Total formal votes		28,374	94.2	
Informal votes		1,745	5.8	
Turnout			80.0	
Party total seats			Seats	±
Independent			7	▼1
Labor			2	▲1
Independent Liberal			1	Steady
Greens			1	Steady

=== 2017 ===
Elected councillor	Party
Ian Tiley	Independent
Debra O'Brien	Country Labor
Margaret O'Connor	Ind. Liberal
Dorothy Robinson	Greens
Simon Murray	Independent
Jon Galletly	Independent
Libby Martin	Independent
Diane Gray	Independent
Andrew Murat	Independent
Bradley Widders	Independent
Paul Gaddes	Independent

2017 New South Wales local elections: Armidale
Party	Candidate	Votes	%	±%
Independent	Ian Tiley	1,726	11.2	
Country Labor (Group D)	1. Debra O'Brien; 2. Susan McMichael; 3. Liam Dudgeon; 4. Yvonne Langenberg; 5. Jasmin Hughes; 6. Margaret Finley	1,706	11.0	+11.0
Independent Liberal (Group B)	1. Margaret O'Connor; 2. Mavis Ahoy; 3. Tony Sorensen; 4. Suresh Simson; 5. Amber Fernandez; 6. Alex Cunningham; 7. David Buck	1,588	10.3	
Independent	Simon Murray	1,502	9.7	
Independent	Jon Galletly	1,405	9.1	
Greens (Group C)	1. Dorothy Robinson; 2. Peter O'Donohue; 3. Tim Collins; 4. Pat Schultz; 5. Johanna Garnet; 6. Dora Koops	1,163	7.5	−5.7
New England Futures Group (Group A)	1. David Levingstone; 2. Inga Brasche; 3. Laurence Nussbaumer; 4. Heidi Evans	675	4.4	+4.4
Independent	Libby Martin	665	4.3	
Independent	Diane Gray	481	3.1	
Independent	Bradley Widders	476	3.1	
Independent	Jim Maher	445	2.9	
Independent	Andrew Murat	432	2.8	
Independent	Peter Bailey	415	2.7	
Independent	Kevin Dupe	368	2.4	
Independent Liberal	Aileen MacDonald	296	1.9	
Independent	Maria Hitchcock	241	1.6	
Independent	Michelle Wheatley	234	1.5	
Independent	Les Davis	205	1.3	
Independent	Gordon Cope	202	1.3	
Independent	Joshua Fittler	179	1.2	
Independent	Jack Hobbs	167	1.1	
Independent	Herman Beyersdorf	161	1.0	
Independent	Colin Gadd	158	1.0	
Independent	Jack Rapely	137	0.9	
Independent	Martha Saw	108	0.7	
Independent	Trev Smith	102	0.7	
Independent	Tom Walsh	99	0.6	
Independent	Aziz Winrow	65	0.4	
Independent	Dale Curtis	59	0.4	
Total formal votes		15,460	94.09	
Informal votes		971	5.91	
Turnout		16,431	80.64	
Party total votes
Independent		10,032	64.9	
Independent Liberal		1,884	12.2	
Labor		1,706	11.0	+11.0
Greens		1,163	7.5	−5.7
New England Futures Group		675	4.4	+4.4

== See also ==
- Local government areas of New South Wales
