= Guyra, New South Wales =

Guyra
- Town
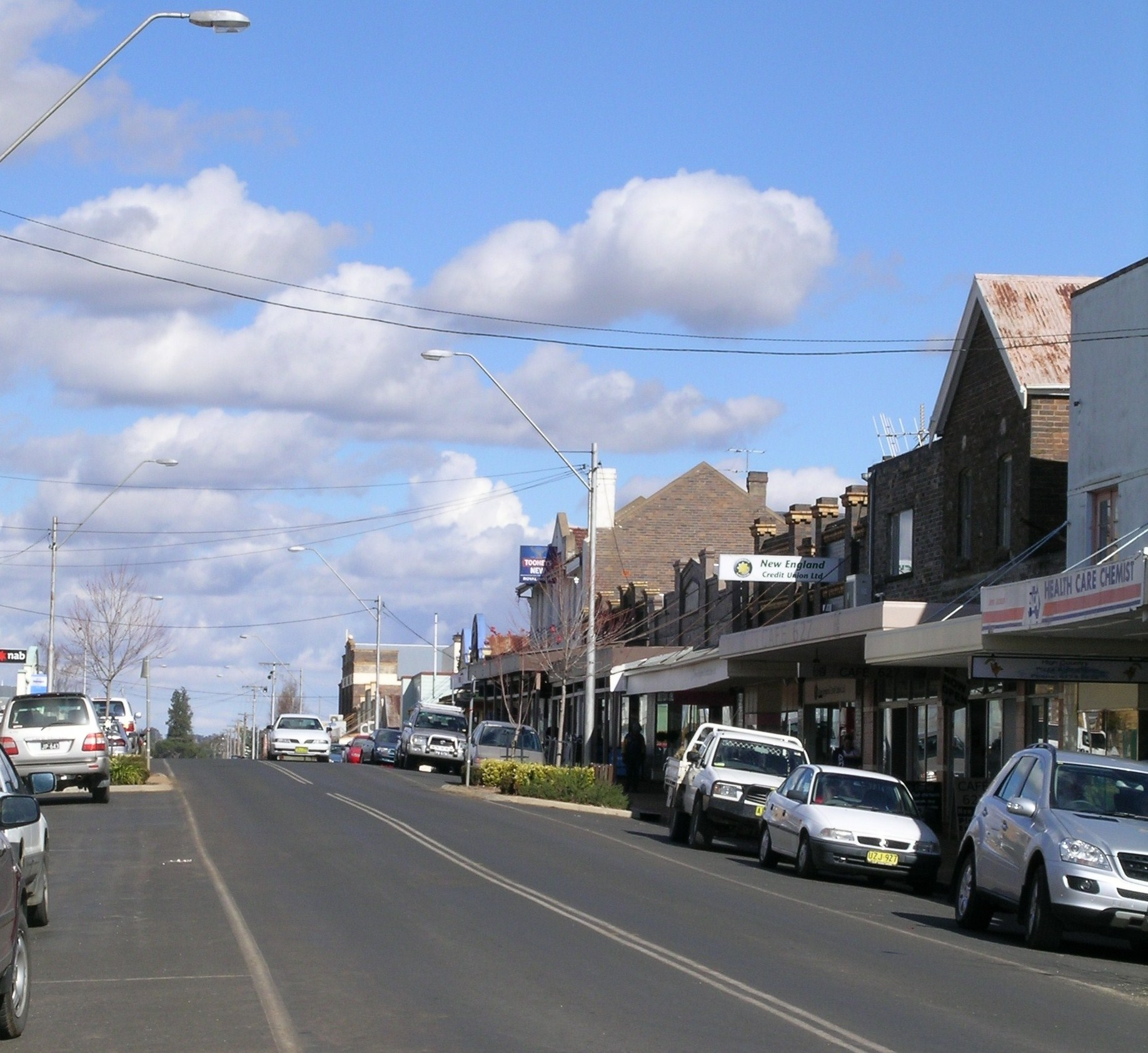
- Main street of Guyra

- Coordinates: 30°12′S 151°40′E
- Country: Australia
- State: New South Wales
- LGA: Armidale Regional Council
- Location: 547 km (340 mi) N of Sydney; 38 km (24 mi) N of Armidale; 61 km (38 mi) S of Glen Innes
- Established: 1885

Government
  - State electorate: Northern Tablelands
  - Federal division: New England
- Elevation: 1,330 m (4,360 ft)

Population
  - Total: 2,077 (2021 census)
- Postcode: 2365
- County: Hardinge
- Mean max temp: 17.8 °C (64.0 °F)
- Mean min temp: 6.6 °C (43.9 °F)
- Annual rainfall: 913.2 mm (35.95 in)

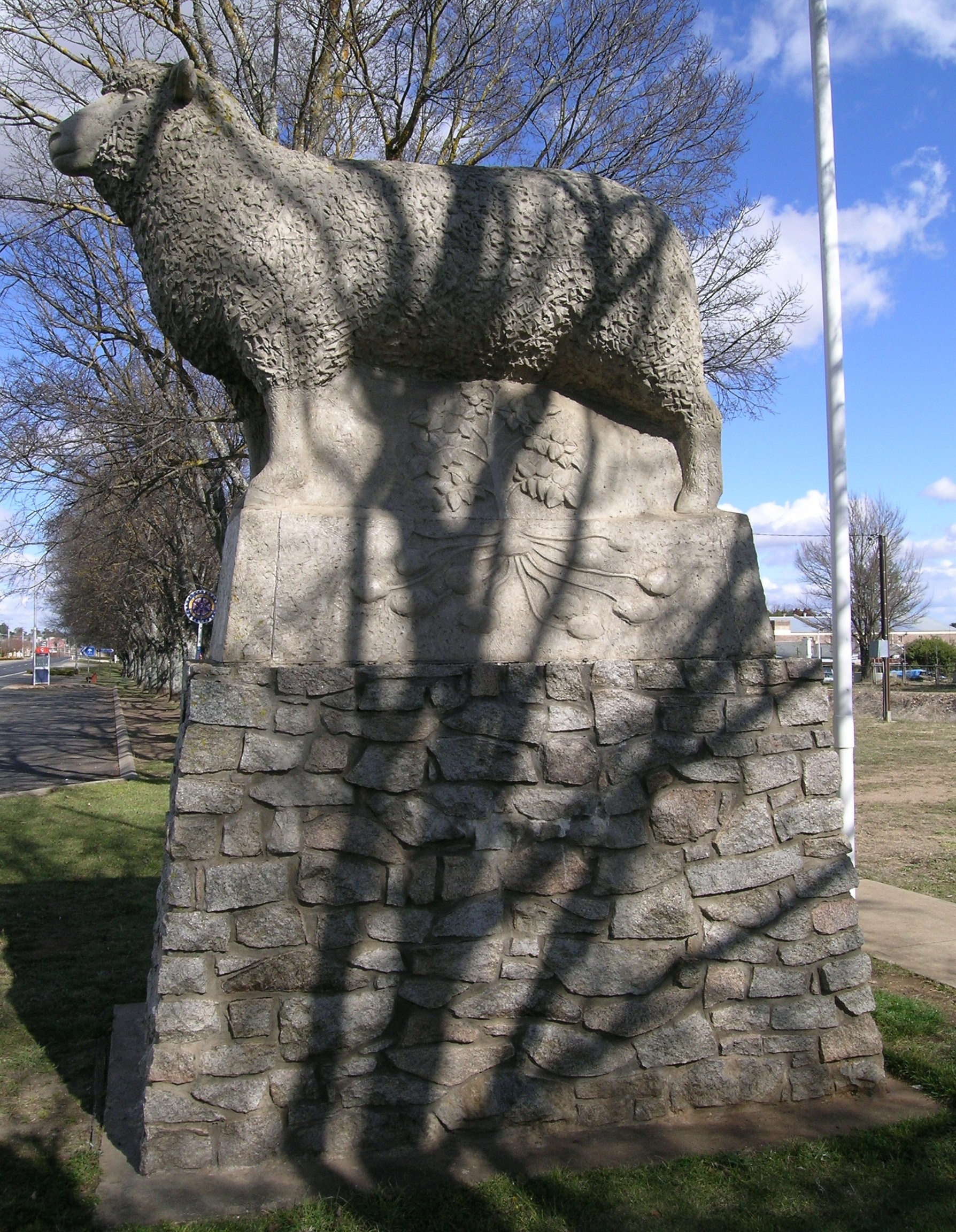
Statue commemorating the lamb and potato industries, Guyra, NSW

Guyra is a town situated midway between Armidale and Glen Innes on the Northern Tablelands in the New England region of New South Wales, Australia. It is within Armidale Regional Council and at the 2021 census, it had a population of 2,077.

The New England Highway is the main transport link to Guyra. The Northern Railway tracks still pass through the town, but the line is now disused north of Armidale.

Guyra is located to one side of the Mother of Ducks Lagoon which is contained within the crater of an extinct volcano. The Mother of Ducks Lagoon Nature Reserve has been placed on the Register of the National Estate. The golf course, picnic areas and a walkway to a viewing platform are situated on the shores of the lagoon.

All rivers on the eastern side of the railway line that runs through the town flow towards the Pacific Ocean, while those west of the railway line run west, ultimately to join the Murray River.

== History ==
The Gamilaaray group of Indigenous Australians were the inhabitants of the region surrounding Guyra. It was originally known as Hillgo'el or Illgoel, an Aboriginal word of the Yukambal meaning a "swamp" and was later changed to the name of Marsh's run, "Guyra". The name Guyra is said to originate from the language of the Gamilaraay (Kamilaroi, Gomeroi) people; meaning 'white cockatoo' or 'fishing place'. The Gumbaynggirr group of Indigenous Australians were the inhabitants of eastern Guyra surrounding area. Guyra was known to the Gumbaynggirr people as Black Cockatoo which can be found in the Kumbangirir Language booklet. Settlement by European farmers began in the 1835 when Alexander Campbell took up Guyra Station, which encompassed the present town area. Ollera Station was settled in 1838 and had the first church in the Guyra district when it was built in 1876. In 1840 Donald McIntyre was recorded as the lessee of "Gyra"; and in 1848 'Guyra' then 15,000 acres (61 km^{2}), was leased by Charles William Marsh. The Great Northern Railway was extended through Guyra in 1884. Guyra was proclaimed as a village on 20 March 1885. Dairying was an important industry during the 1890s after which potato growing became more popular. Guyra Post Office opened on 1 May 1877. The railway was officially opened on 19 August 1884, as part of the Great Northern Railway extension from Armidale to Glen Innes.

Guyra became the focus of national attention on 5 February 1960 when a four-year-old boy named Steven Walls wandered off from his father on a property north of the town and became lost for four days. Hundreds of volunteers searched the bush for the boy until he was discovered asleep against a log. His immediate question to searchers was 'Where's my daddy, where's my daddy?'; which gave rise to a hit song by singer Johnny Ashcroft, entitled 'Little Boy Lost'. A film of the events was later commercially made using many of the local people of Guyra and shown across Australia.

Guyra was home to a large regional abattoir that employed up to 350 staff until it closed in 1995. The abattoir building now houses an angora rabbit breeding establishment.

== Heritage listings ==
Guyra has a number of heritage-listed sites, including:

- Main Northern railway: Guyra railway station

== Geography and climate ==
Located on a volcanic uplift of the Northern Tablelands, the town is one of the highest in Australia at 1,330 metres (4,364 feet) above sea level. The town is known for its cold winters, by Australian standards, with an average of 42 nights below 0 °C (32 °F) each year and some snowfalls. Owing to Guyra's position on a high plateau, it rarely gets above 30 °C (86 °F) during summer, which is unusual for any Australian town. The record maximum temperature for Guyra is 35.1 °C (95.2 °F) on 11 February 2017, recorded at Guyra's current station at the hospital. The record minimum temperature is −7.8 °C (18.0 °F) recorded on 26 June 1971 at Guyra Post Office.

On 3–4 July 1984, an intense and widespread cold snap produced moderate to heavy snowfalls throughout the Northern Tablelands, including Guyra. During the event, Guyra recorded a maximum temperature of −0.3 °C (31.5 °F) on 3 July and 0.5 °C (32.9 °F) on 4 July. The maximum for 3 July is the most northerly sub-zero maximum temperature recorded in Australia. On one of the days during the event, Guyra recorded a 3 pm temperature of −3.2 °C (26.2 °F), possibly the coldest mid-afternoon reading outside the Snowy Mountains. On 12 October 2012, widespread snowfalls unusually late in the year were recorded over the Northern Tablelands, including Guyra, which recorded 17 centimetres (6.7 in) at 9am that day.

Climate data for Guyra Hospital (1981–2024); 1,329 m AMSL; 30.21° S, 151.68° E
Month	Jan	Feb	Mar	Apr	May	Jun	Jul	Aug	Sep	Oct	Nov	Dec	Year
Record high °C (°F)	34.4 (93.9)	35.1 (95.2)	30.2 (86.4)	27.0 (80.6)	21.6 (70.9)	19.1 (66.4)	18.7 (65.7)	25.2 (77.4)	26.0 (78.8)	29.3 (84.7)	33.2 (91.8)	34.6 (94.3)	35.1 (95.2)
Mean daily maximum °C (°F)	24.3 (75.7)	23.3 (73.9)	21.3 (70.3)	18.1 (64.6)	14.5 (58.1)	11.2 (52.2)	10.6 (51.1)	12.2 (54.0)	15.5 (59.9)	18.6 (65.5)	20.8 (69.4)	22.8 (73.0)	17.8 (64.0)
Mean daily minimum °C (°F)	12.3 (54.1)	11.9 (53.4)	10.1 (50.2)	7.0 (44.6)	4.0 (39.2)	1.9 (35.4)	0.8 (33.4)	1.2 (34.2)	3.9 (39.0)	6.5 (43.7)	9.0 (48.2)	10.9 (51.6)	6.6 (43.9)
Record low °C (°F)	1.4 (34.5)	3.5 (38.3)	−0.3 (31.5)	−2.8 (27.0)	−6.0 (21.2)	−6.5 (20.3)	−7.1 (19.2)	−7.0 (19.4)	−5.5 (22.1)	−4.0 (24.8)	−2.6 (27.3)	1.3 (34.3)	−7.1 (19.2)
Average precipitation mm (inches)	119.3 (4.70)	100.5 (3.96)	70.9 (2.79)	51.4 (2.02)	52.4 (2.06)	51.5 (2.03)	56.4 (2.22)	53.1 (2.09)	58.1 (2.29)	75.9 (2.99)	104.5 (4.11)	109.7 (4.32)	913.2 (35.95)
Average precipitation days (≥ 0.2mm)	11.5	10.9	10.2	8.9	9.6	11.3	10.9	8.7	8.6	10.1	11.4	11.8	123.9
Average afternoon relative humidity (%)	54	58	56	56	59	63	59	52	51	50	55	53	55
Source: Bureau of Meteorology

== Industries ==
The principal industries include fine wool and prime lambs, beef cattle, potatoes and tomatoes. A 20 ha greenhouse has been built at Guyra which will employ up to 240 workers and produce 12 million kg of tomatoes making them the largest tomato producer in Australia. Top of the Range Tomatoes, Guyra won the Northern Inland Development Innovation Award for Agriculture and also the Innovator of the Year Award in 2007.

The main annual celebration is the Lamb and Potato Festival held in January. Other events are the Guyra Show, held in February each year, the Rotary Christmas Carnival in December, and in 2009 the first Mountain Bike Challenge was held on 14 March as a fundraiser for the Westpac Rescue Helicopter service.

Trout fishing is a popular pastime with local streams stocked yearly. Laura Creek flowing from Guyra to the west is popular and is accessed via Balderseigh Road. Fishing cabins and cottages are available for accommodation at 26 km.

The local bowling club boasts of being the highest (elevation above sea level) bowling green in the southern hemisphere, which is in fact not correct as there are several lawn bowling clubs in Johannesburg, South Africa, which is at several hundred metres higher elevation than Guyra.

There are many local organisations such as Lions and Rotary. The town also has a strong sporting background with rugby league, polocrosse, soccer, field hockey, and cricket teams. Guyra also has bowling greens, tennis courts, a cricket field and a gun and rifle range.

== Population ==
Historical population
Year	Pop.	±%
1954	1,557	—
1961	1,628	+4.6%
1966	1,700	+4.4%
1971	1,790	+5.3%
1976	1,933	+8.0%
1981	1,840	−4.8%
1986	1,999	+8.6%
1991	1,942	−2.9%
1996	1,801	−7.3%
2001	1,725	−4.2%
2006	1,758	+1.9%
2011	1,947	+10.8%
2016	1,983	+1.8%
2021	2,077	+4.7%
Source: Australian Bureau of Statistics data.

According to the 2021 census of Population, there were 2,077 people in Guyra.

- Aboriginal and Torres Strait Islander people made up 9.5% of the population.
- 73.2% of people were born in Australia and 77.4% of people spoke only English at home.
- The most common responses for religion were No Religion 27.5%, Anglican 22.4% and Catholic 19.0%.
