= Robin Edward Dysart Grey =

Australian banker

Sir Robin Edward Dysart Grey Bt
- Born: 12 November 1886; Roma, Queensland, Australia
- Died: 2 June 1974 (aged 87); Brisbane, Queensland, Australia
- Occupation: Banker
- Title: Baronet Grey of Fallodon
- Predecessor: Sir Harry Martin Grey
- Successor: Sir Anthony Dysart Grey
- Spouse: Emily Maud Wilson
- Family: Grey

Sir Robin Edward Dysart Grey (1886–1974) was an Australian banker, member of the ancient English House of Grey and the 6th Baronet Grey of Fallodon. He was born in outback Queensland where his father had moved as a young man from Ireland to work as a jackaroo. Grey succeeded his cousin, Sir Harry Martin Grey, to the baronetcy in 1960.

== Early life and family ==
Grey was born at Roma in outback Queensland in 1886, the elder of two children born to Edward George Grey (1858–1935) and his Australian-born wife, Annette Marie Franck. His younger sister was Annette Bluebell Dysart Grey (1890–1981), born in Victoria, where the family lived for several years. He was descended from Charles Grey, 1st Earl Grey and was second cousin to Edward Grey, 1st Viscount Grey who was British Foreign Secretary from 1905 to 1916.

Robin's father, Edward George Grey, was born in Dublin, the youngest child of Charles Samuel Grey (1811–60), Paymaster of the Irish Civil Services, and Margaret Dysart Hunter, daughter of General Sir Martin Hunter. Charles was the son of Sir George Grey, 1st Baronet Grey of Fallodon and nephew of Charles Grey, 2nd Earl Grey, prime minister of the United Kingdom from 1830 to 1834. Edward was educated at Hanley Castle and Cheltenham Grammar Schools, moving to Australia as a young man and working as a jackaroo at Mitchell Downs and station manager before acquiring Mooraberrie Station.

Though Australian born, Grey was not disconnected from his extended family in England, visiting England for the first time as a young child in the late 1890s with his family, returning in 1897 on board the steam ship "S. S. Warrnambool". Grey matriculated from Rockhampton Boys Grammar in 1902. In 1916, during World War I, as an only son he was excused from conscription in the Australian Armed Forces. In 1918, he married Emily Maud Wilson in Toowoomba, the younger sister of a friend of Grey's and daughter of Wesley Wilson, a drover, and Emily (née McKelwee), both born in Ireland. Emily Maud was also a niece of Queensland parliamentarian Thomas Johnson and New South Wales parliamentarian Charles Wilson, and cousin to obstetrician and gynaecologist Sir Thomas George Wilson. Robin and Emily had a son, Edward Elton Grey, born in Toowoomba in 1920.

== Career ==
Grey was a banker. He specialised in agricultural financing, reflective of his upbringing on station properties leased and managed by his father. He began his career with Union Bank in Queensland, working at branches in Pittsworth, Gayndah, Townsville and Brisbane, before being transferred to Perth in 1938 and returning to Brisbane in 1947. He was also transferred to Melbourne and Adelaide at various points of his career.

In 1940 he presented evidence in Perth to the West Australian Royal Commission on the Financial and Economic Position of the Pastoral Industry in the Leasehold Areas in Western Australia as part of his role as Inspector with the Union Bank of Australia:

"Whilst fully recognising the very difficult period the industry is now experiencing, particularly in the Gascoyne and Murchison districts, periods of lean years have occurred in the past and have been overcome. We have had experience of the wonderful recuperative powers of station properties, particularly sheep properties, when the inevitable cycle of good seasons eventuates. With this in mind we are continuing every assistance practicable on the merits of each account, and when the drought can be said to have broken definitely our support, within reasonable bounds, will be behind efforts towards rehabilitation, It is the genuine policy of the bank, where the borrower is a trier and is in other respects deserving, to assist him to retain and remain on his property."

The drought Grey referred to was Australia-wide and lasted from 1937–47.

== Baronetcy ==
Grey became the 6th Baronet of Fallodon in 1960, upon the death of his cousin Sir Harry Martin Grey, 5th Baronet of Fallodon, who died without having had children.

Sir Robin died in Queensland in 1974 at the age of 87. Given that his son Edward predeceased him, Sir Robin was succeeded in the baronetcy by his grandson, Sir Anthony Dysart Grey, 7th Baronet and the current holder of the title.

== Arms ==
Coat of arms of Robin Edward Dysart Grey
Crest A scaling ladder in bend sinister Or hooked and pointed Sable. Escutcheon Gules a lion rampant within a bordure engrailed Argent a mullet for difference. Motto De Bon Vouloir Servir Le Roy (To Serve The King With Good Will)

Baronetage of the United Kingdom
Preceded by Sir Harry Martin Grey 5th Baronet Grey of Fallodon	Baronet Grey (of Fallodon); 1960–1974	Succeeded by Sir Anthony Dysart Grey 7th Baronet Grey of Fallodon
