= Johnson's Building =

Johnson's Building may refer to:

- Johnson's Building, The Rocks, a heritage-listed building in Sydney, New South Wales, Australia
- Johnson's Building, Warwick, a heritage-listed building in Queensland, Australia
