= Thomas Alexander Johnson =

Irish Australian businessman

The Hon Thomas Johnson

Member of the Queensland Legislative Council
- In office 4 May 1904 – 28 October 1914

Mayor of Warwick
- In office 1881–1884

Personal details
- Born: Thomas Alexander Johnson; 19 June 1835 Enniskillen, County Fermanagh, Ireland
- Died: 28 October 1914 (aged 79) Warwick, Queensland, Australia
- Spouse: Catherine (Kate) Agnes Wilson (1837-1908)
- Relations: Charles Wilson, Sir Thomas George Wilson, Maud, Lady Grey
- Occupation: Politician; general store operator; businessman

Thomas Alexander Johnson (19 June 1835 – 28 October 1914) was an Irish Australian businessman, Mayor of Warwick and member of the Queensland Legislative Council.

== Biography ==
Johnson was born at Enniskillen, County Fermanagh, Ireland, in 1835, the first of four children born to Edward and Rosanna Johnson.

In Ireland, he worked as a merchant, residing at Trillick. Johnson married Catherine (Kate) Agnes Wilson in Lowtherstown in 1860. Kate was the fourth of twelve children born to William Wilson and Elizabeth Graham of Crossan. Together, Thomas and Kate had seven children, five of whom survived to adulthood. Through Kate, Johnson was brother-in-law to New South Wales parliamentarian Charles Wilson and uncle to Sir Thomas George Wilson and Maud Wilson, later Lady Grey.

Johnson arrived in Warwick, Queensland with his wife and one of her brothers, James Wilson, in 1863. They joined another of Kate's brothers who had already moved to Warwick, Rev. William Wilson, a Methodist minister. Johnson was also involved in establishing the local Methodist Church, including being president of the building committee. Johnson opened a successful general store in Warwick, drawing on his experience as a merchant in Ireland.

Johnson held various positions including President of the Warwick Progress Association, vice-president of the Eastern Downs Agricultural and Pastoral Association and Chairman of the Warwick Farmers' Milling Co. Along with his wife, he was a prominent member of the Warwick Methodist Church. Kate was also President of the Warwick Women's Christian Temperance Union in Warwick in 1895, which not only temperance but female suffrage.

== Political career ==
In 1879, Johnson was elected as an alderman of the Warwick Town Council, serving for nineteen years, which included being mayor from 1881 to 1884. Johnson was a member of the council at the same time as future Queensland Premier, Sir Arthur Morgan. Johnson also served as Chief Magistrate of Warwick.

=== Australian Commonwealth Bill ===
In 1900, Johnson and his wife Kate traveled to the United Kingdom promoting Queensland and its produce, returning over 18 months later in 1901. While there, Johnson arranged to attend the reading of the Commonwealth of Australia Constitution Act at Parliament in Westminster, of which he gave the following account:

"We arrived in London on 11th May, the voyage having taken 44 days from Sydney to London — one day in advance of contract time. On the day after our arrival I saw by the London papers that the Australian Commonwealth Bill was to be introduced in the House of Commons on the following Monday. As you can imagine, being a Queenslander, I felt very anxious to hear the great speeches in connection with the introduction of this Bill, being also aware that this must be a great historical event in connection with the future of Australia. Sir Horace Tozer very kindly obtained for me a card of admittance to the House of Commons, although a large number of people had to be refused for want of room, as very great interest was taken in London and throughout England on the introduction of the Bill. I got a good seat, and had the pleasure and honor of hearing the Right Hon. Joseph Chamberlain, Secretary of State for the Colonies, deliver his speech in introducing the Bill."

"There was great enthusiasm in the House during the delivery of this speech, and the plaudits from both sides of the House were very frequent. Mr. Chamberlain has a fine, gentlemanly, prepossessing appearance, and is an attractive speaker. I was very pleased to find, when the leader of the Opposition (Sir Henry Campbell-Bannerman) got up to reply, his remarks were of a very friendly character toward the Australian colonies - in fact the whole of the introduction of this Bill and the friendly expressions used toward the Australian colonies from both sides of the House made me feel proud to be an Australian."

In May 1904, he was appointed by the Governor of Queensland to the Queensland Legislative Council, the former upper house of the Queensland Parliament. Appointments to the Legislative Council were made for life, and Johnson remained a member until his death ten years later. During a period of his time as a member of the upper house, Johnson's former fellow councilor from Warwick, Sir Arthur Morgan, was Premier of Queensland.

Johnson had an enduring interest in railways throughout his career, both as a businessman and politician, supporting the construction of a railway from Warwick to Maryvale, known as the Via Recta, the first section of which opened in 1911 but was never completed.

=== Voting Rights ===
Johnson was a member of the Queensland Parliament when the Elections Act Amendment Act 1905 act was passed, enabling female suffrage from the age of 21 and the abolition of the plural vote for men who owned property. He made the following remarks in the Legislative Council when the Bill was being debated:

"This is a very important Bill, although it is a very short one, and when it becomes law it will establish a new era in the political history of Queensland. I may state at once that I intend to vote for the Bill. It is no use beating about the bush, and being misunderstood on an important matter of this kind. I do not want to give a silent vote upon it, consequently I will endeavor, as briefly as possible, to give a few reasons for the vote I intend to record."

"In the first place I approve of giving the franchise to women, and have been of that opinion for years past, as I believe that intelligent women can and will exercise the vote as faultlessly, and in many cases with greater discrimination, than a great many men do... I consider that it would be inadvisable to offer strong or factious opposition to this Bill. No doubt its passing into law may be delayed, but it will be passed into law, and all the efforts of this House to prevent it will be like an attempt to keep back the tide with a pitchfork. I do not say it is not open to amendment in some of its details, but there seems to be a wave of feeling at the present time rolling over the Commonwealth from one side to the other in favor of adult suffrage.

"It will place great power as well as great responsibilities in the hands of the people, and I trust the electors will recognise those great responsibilities, by returning good, honest, liberal men to Parliament"

=== The University of Queensland ===
Johnson supported the creation of the University of Queensland, established by an Act of Parliament on 10 December 1909, expressing dismay that it had not been established sooner:

"The Bill may be termed a democratic measure, as it will meet the requirements of all classes of the community. For instance, the clever sons or daughters of working men, who may wish to improve their position, and, by perseverance and industry, avail themselves of the University and prepare for occupying higher positions in tho State, will have the opportunity of doing so. It seems rather extraordinary that a Bill of this kind should not have been introduced for so many years in an intelligent community like the city of Brisbane. When the Secretary for Public Instruction introduced the Bill in the other Chamber, he stated that it was thirty five yours since the foundation of a University was first brought before the Queensland Parliament by Sir Charles Lilley and the Hon. John Douglas. That was in the year 1874. Seventeen years after that, in the year 1891, a most important and influential Royal Commission was appointed, of which the Premier of the day, two bishops, Supreme Court judges, and the head masters of grammar schools were members, to bring up a report on the matter. Again the thing filled out and no thing was done. We have waited eighteen years since then, until 1909, and nothing was done until the present Kidston Government took the matter up, and it is very much to their credit that they have brought forward this Bill."

Johnson was politically independent, not belonging to any party.

== Later life ==
Johnson's wife Kate died in 1908, having been paralysed for several years before that. He died in Warwick in on 28 October 1914, from heart failure. He was survived by four of his children.

== Legacy ==
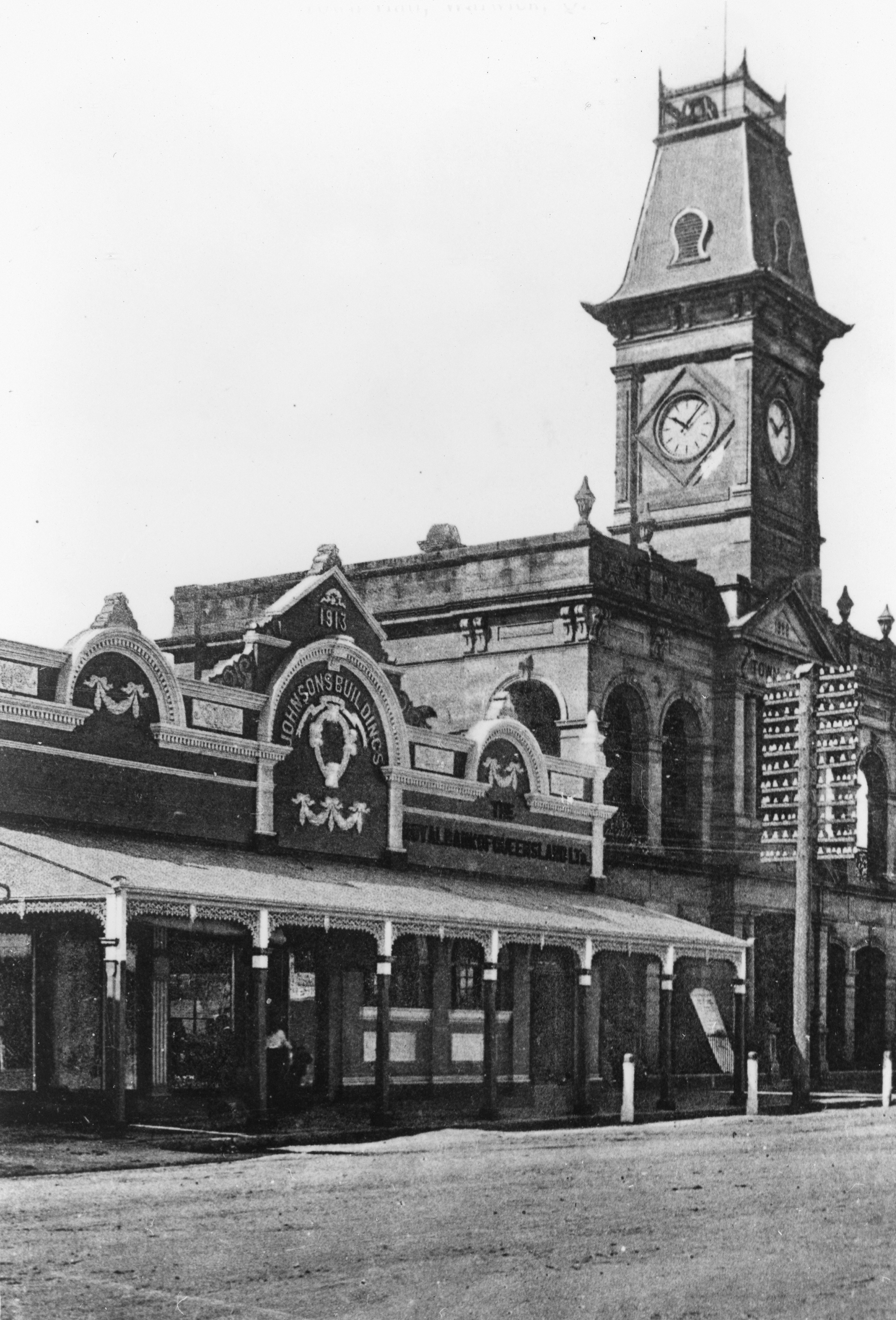
Johnson's Building (left) and Warwick Town Hall (right), circa 1918

After purchasing land in Palmerin Street in Warwick in 1896, Johnson engaged architect Conrad Cobden Dornbusch to design a building containing several shops, including Johnson's own store. Johnson's Building features a distinctive arched facade. It still functions as shops and is listed on the Queensland Heritage Register.
