= Bill Hirschberg =

Australia international rugby union player (1881–1963)

- Born: William Adolphus Hirschberg; 1 December 1881 Armidale, New South Wales
- Died: 30 July 1963 (aged 81)

Rugby union career
- Position: Flanker
International career
Years	Team	Apps	(Points)
1905	Australia	1	(0)

William Adolphus Hirschberg (1 December 1881 – 30 July 1963) was an Australian international rugby union player.

Hirschberg, a flanker, was born in Armidale, New South Wales and claimed one international rugby cap for Australia, playing against New Zealand, in Dunedin, on 2 September 1905. He had already played for New South Wales against New Zealand.

Hirschberg participated in the first inter-state game played in Western Australia, held in 1907, where he played as a forward for the winning team, New South Wales. He played another inter-state game against Queensland in 1910.
