= Mount Yarrowyck =

Mountain in northern New South Wales, Australia

Highest point
- Coordinates: 30°27′30″S 151°23′06″E

Mount Yarrowyck is a mountain in northern New South Wales, Australia and has an elevation of 1153 metres. The mountain is located 23.4 km west of Uralla, 27.8 km west of Armidale and 38 km west of Guyra. The nearest sealed road to Mount Yarrowyck is located 18 km away named as the Bundarra Road.

The government of New South Wales has established Mount Yarrowyck Nature Reserve in Yarrowyck to protect natural environment and Aboriginal cave paintings, which are between 100 and 500 years old.
