= Hunter River Lancers Training Depot =

- Location within New South Wales
- 30.5195°S 151.6582°E
- Location: Allingham Street, Armidale, New South Wales, Australia

Commonwealth Heritage List
- Official name: Hunter River Lancers Training Depot
- Type: Listed place (Historic)
- Designated: 22 June 2004
- Reference no.: 105656

Hunter River Lancers Training Depot is a heritage-listed military installation at Allingham Street, Armidale, New South Wales, Australia. It was added to the Australian Commonwealth Heritage List on 22 June 2004.

== History ==
The first record of army use in Armidale was c. 1897, when the 6th Light Horse was based in the town during the Boer War; the first official record was two years later in 1899. These events appear to have been related to a site in Faulkner Street, Armidale. A larger, less flood prone site, in Mann Street, was acquired by the Commonwealth in 1904. The transaction was gazetted in May 1906. A weatherboard drill hall was erected, based on a specification dated 1 December 1906. The complex also included a well and a gun shed, with a harness room, workshop and cart room, erected in April 1911.

Until 1901 defence was the responsibility of each state. The Defence Act 1903 constituted the legislative basis for the Australian Military System. The passing of the Defence Act in December 1909 introduced a Universal Training Scheme based on the Swiss model which provided for the compulsory training of Junior and Senior cadets from the age of 12-18 and then for adult training. The Minister for Defence laid down the principal that "the cost of Drill Halls was to be put down to bedrock", since so many were required. This would appear to have resulted in the design of wood and iron drill halls.

Before Federation all public works were undertaken by State Works Departments. Although the responsibility for the construction of public works was under the Public Works Branch of the Department of Home Affairs, many Commonwealth works were undertaken by the State Works Departments in the early years.

From 1901 to c. 1910 drill halls were generally rented in each state or leased by the Commonwealth, with some purchased. The erection of the new drill hall in Armidale in 1906 appears to have been an exception, a result of the regional importance of Armidale in the 2nd Military District (NSW) and the inadequacy of the existing site. Between 1 January 1910 and 7 October 1913 14 drill halls were erected with one purchased in NSW. The Armidale Drill Hall was designed and erected by the Department of Public Works, New South Wales, according to plans and specifications prepared for the Director of Works by the New South Wales Government Architect's Office.

The specification described the Drill Hall as a wooden building roofed with iron and containing a large Drill Hall and six officer's rooms and separate double wooden closets with concrete floors. The closets were to a standard design by the office of the Government Architect, Walter Liberty Vernon, dated 22 February 1900. Vernon as New South Wales Colonial Architect from 1890 to 1911 appears to have been responsible for the design of the drill hall and associated buildings. Bricks were to be laid in old English Bond with damp proof courses and hoop iron reinforcing. Air gratings were to be fixed for the sub floor spaces with slate steps to the outer doors set on brick risers. External cladding and carpentry were to be of hardwood the frame and roof timbers of Oregon or approved local pine. Architraves and mouldings were to be in redwood, floor boards tallow wood and lining boards in kauri pine. The roof comprised four steel and timber trusses with cast iron jointing pieces which were to be made by the contractor. The patterns would remain the property of the Commonwealth. The roof is clearly described as hipped with gablets. The main entrance was to be covered by a pent roof formed by extending the main roof. Externally the hall was to be covered with rusticated mahogany weatherboards.

The development of drill halls for training does not appear to have been fully implemented until 1912, when urgent discussions took place between the Department of Hoem Affairs and the Department of Home Affairs. This followed Parliament's decision to vote 80,000 pounds for the construction of drill halls, and for the purchase of suitable sites. At the suggestion of King O'Malley and the Department of Home Affairs, the selection and acquisition of land was undertaken jointly by the two Departments. A reference of 19 March 1913 reveals that standard plans, to four basic designs, had been sent to the Department of Defence by the Department of Home Affairs to expedite the construction of drill halls. In addition existing drill halls were in some instances enlarged to provide extra accommodation.

In 1913 the drill hall at the Hunter River Lancers Training Depot was extended, by the addition of a skillion at one end, to include three offices on brick foundations. In 1922 the drill hall was described as a Type 4 in a survey of drill halls, by the Commonwealth. This referred to the standard Commonwealth designs of 1913 with Type 4's 60x30 feet with a 12-foot skillion down one side. Latrines and a small arms range were also accommodated on the site in addition to a parade ground on the Allingham Street frontage in preparation for a possible international conflict.

Armidale served as the training area for the 4th Brigade, 13th Battalion and was later the HQ of the 33rd Battalion and the 12th Light Horse. In 1906 the 4th and 6th Australian Light Horse were renamed the "Hunter River Lancers" and the "New England Light Horse". In 1918 both units were redesignated to become the 16th Light Horse and the 12th Light Horse (New England Light Horse) respectively. Members of both units saw active service with the AIF in the First World War as part of the Light Horse Regiments AIF. The 16th and 12th Light Horse were disbanded in 1943.

During the Second World War 1939-45 the site was briefly used to accommodate Italian POWs.

With the reformation of the Commonwealth Military Forces (CMF) in 1948 the 12/16 Hunter River Lancers Regiment was formed and was equipped with Matilda tanks. In 1952 the tanks were replaced with Staghound Armoured Cars. Following other changes the Regiment became an RAAC Regiment in 1972 comprising RHQ, HQ Squadron a Cavalry Squadron and an APC Squadron. During the 1950s the Workshop section of the former Gun Shed (now Q-Store) was used as accommodation by the Sergeant, with the Camp Cart and Gun Shed sections used as classrooms. A prefabricated Riley-Newsum house for the Warrant Officer Training was erected in the 1950s at the opposite end of the site. This now serves as a local museum and is fenced off from the remainder of the site.

The depot is presently used by Defence for tank training and maintenance. At the rear of the site, building 7 houses the tanks, with a wash down area and maintenance bay.

The former depot in Faulkner Street has been demolished and is no longer occupied by Defence. In 2001/2002 Gutteridge Haskins Davey undertook a heritage analysis of the Mann Street site with respect to Building 2, the Q-Store, which Defence wanted to replace with a new Q store (Quartermasters store). As at May 2002 this had not been demolished.

== Description ==
Hunter River Lancers Training Depot is at allingham Street, corner Mann Street, Armidale, comprising the Drill Hall, Q-Store (former Gun Shed), and Parade Ground.

The depot site, comprising blocks 10, 11 and 12, is surrounded by modern development including town houses. The site is close to the railway line and station as well as the main Grafton Road, illustrating the prominent siting given to drill halls in the urban landscape. In common with many drill halls and training depots, the buildings were arranged along the boundaries of the site to maximise site utilisation. The site slopes from south to north towards Mann Street. This slope appears to have resulted in the Drill Hall being sited at the rear of the block in order to maintain functional open space, the parade ground, in front of the hall, visible from both Allingham and Mann Streets. Drill Halls were seen as part of a setting designed to achieve prominence in the streetscape. The former Gun Shed, now the Q-Store, was also sited at the rear of the block adjacent to a small laneway, for servicing and proximity to the Railway Station.

The depot comprises 5 main structures: the Drill Hall (1); the Q-Store, former Gun Shed (2); tank garages and wash-down areas (7); former Warrant Officers House; and a modern demountable (8). The former Warrant Officers House has been adapted considerably both internally and externally and is of relatively low integrity. Structures and sites above the threshold for inclusion in the Register include buildings 1 and 2 and the area of the former parade ground on the north side of the Drill Hall, which provides a functional and spatial context for the Drill Hall. The separation of the Drill hall and Q-Store is characteristic of the layout of such training depots.

The Drill Hall, located at the south east corner of the site, is generically similar in design to the Gladesville Drill Hall erected in 1900 by the NSW Colonial Government. However, the hipped roof with gablets contrasts strongly with the gabled forms employed in NSW, and is generically similar to early designs employed by the Commonwealth, which reflected the prevailing Federation style adopted later by Commonwealth architects such as John Smith Murdoch. The draft Drill Halls Data Base (as at May 2002), compiled by Allom Lovell, Architects, for Defence, describes the drill hall as follows.

'The Hall is standard 60x30 dimension and originally would have had offices at each end. Skillion roofed offices and armoury have been added to south and beyond this an extension to the armoury and toilets at the south west corner. More recent extensions have been made on the west and for recreation facilities. The roof is Dutch gable form and recently clad in corrugated Colorbond with the original roof profile changed. The ridge ventilators have been removed. The building is clad externally with rusticated weatherboard and the windows are double hung timber on the east and pivot type on the north. The double hall doors are timber with glazed top panel. The interior walls are lined with Masonite over the original timber boards. The open roof trusses are unique and constructed with 6x4 inch top chords and a network of 4x4 inch timber braces and single and paired 5/8 inch iron rods connected with cast iron joint fixings.'

It would appear that the roof profile has not been changed with respect to the original specification of 1906, merely recovered with the loss of the original ridge ventilators.

The Gun Shed, now the Q-Store, comprises four rooms: the Gun Shed originally dirt floor now concrete; the Camp carts section with concrete (originally dirt) floor; the Harness room with timber floor; and the Workshop section with timber floor. The building features hardwood stumps, hardwood floor, wall and framing structure, tallowwood flooring and Oregon doors. Internally the building has lost evidence of the original fittings including shelving and saddle brackets. The Gun Shed and Camp Cart sections are now lined with asbestos cement sheeting. The gabled roof is covered with corrugated galvanised iron.

== Condition and integrity ==
Both the Q-Store and the Drill hall are in good condition (April 2002)

The Drill has been reroofed in Colorbond and extended at one end. The extensions and changes illustrate the adaptation of the drill hall in the lead up to the First World War to bring the hall up to standard and the changes required to incorporate an armoury and new toilets. Overall the building is of relatively high integrity when compared to the original design.

The Q-Store has been adapted by the insertion of concrete floors to replace dirt floors. Internal fittings have been lost. (April 2002)

== Heritage listing ==
The Hunter River Lancers Training Depot was listed on the Australian Commonwealth Heritage List on 22 June 2004 with the following rationale:

The Hunter River Lancers Training Depot in Mann Street, Armidale, acquired in 1904, is important for its association with the early implementation of military training under the Commonwealth following the 1903 Defence Act and with Armidale's Light Horse military history. The Drill Hall (1906), Q-Store (former Gun Shed 1911) and the Parade Ground are important in illustrating the role of the New South Wales Department of Public Works in erecting buildings designed by the Government Architect's Office, New South Wales, under Walter Liberty Vernon as Government Architect 1890–1911, for the Commonwealth Government, in the years leading up to the First World War.

The Drill Hall and former Gun Shed are of exceptional interest as unusual and surviving examples of weatherboard military buildings designed by the New South Wales Government Architect and erected by the Department of Public Works for the Commonwealth, before the implementation of standard designs in 1913.

The Drill Hall and Q-Store are important in illustrating the principal characteristics of the siting, layout and design of drill halls and associated buildings for citizens militia training. The simple rectangular buildings are located on a prominent site close to the railway and main road, the stores at the rear. The drill hall and Q-Store are of stud framed weatherboard construction, with timber floors and corrugated galvanised iron roofs.

The Drill Hall and former Gun Shed in Hunter River Lancers Training Depot are highly valued by members of the community for their cultural and social associations.
