= Armidale High School =

Location
- Armidale, New South Wales; Australia
- Coordinates: 30°30′49″S 151°39′19″E

Information
- Type: Government-funded co-educational comprehensive secondary day school
- Motto: Latin: Fortiter, Fideliter, Feliciter (Courage, Honesty, Happiness)
- Established: 1920
- Status: Closed
- Closed: 2018
- Educational authority: New South Wales Department of Education
- Years: 7–12
- Campus: Regional
- Area: 20 hectares (49 acres)
- Colours: Burgundy and navy

Armidale High School was a government-funded co-educational comprehensive secondary day school, located in Armidale, a university city in the New England region of northern New South Wales, Australia. Established in 1920, the school merged with Duval High School in January 2019 to allow for the newly established Armidale Secondary College.

The school had a non-selective enrolment policy and at the time of closure catered to approximately 715 students from Year 7 to Year 12. The school was operated by the New South Wales Department of Education, and prepared students for the Record of School Achievement (Year 10), and the NSW Higher School Certificate (Year 12).

== History ==
Founded in 1920, Armidale High School was the first public secondary school to be established in Armidale, drawing students from Armidale and from around the New England region. Because of poor transport, many of these students boarded at two hostels maintained by the Church of England, St John's for boys and the Memorial Hostel for girls.

The establishment of the Armidale Teachers' College (1928) and then the New England University College (1938), now the University of New England, drew teachers to Armidale for career reasons and helped create a vibrant sporting and academic culture. The school expanded quickly over the 1950s and 1960s as the expansion of the university brought new families to the city. This created pressures on facilities, leading to the establishment in 1974 of a new high school, Duval High School, on the northern outskirts of Armidale.

Structural changes in Australian higher education resulting from the Dawkins Education Reforms from the late 1980s lead to significant job losses in Armidale, population decline and hence declines in student numbers at the two high schools. Faced with the need to renew buildings and facilities as well as the need to accommodate renewed student growth, the New South Wales Government decided to merge the two high schools. In 2018 it was announced that Armidale High would merge with Duval High to form the newly established Armidale Secondary College that will cater for approximately 1,500 students from Year 7 to Year 12. The installation of a temporary additional school at Duval High School started, in readiness for students during the transition period from January 2019. Construction of Armidale Secondary College commenced on the Armidale High School site in 2019 and will continue in 2020. It is expected that Armidale Secondary College will commence in Term 1, 2021. While the merge caused some distress among alumni of both schools, the plans provide for preservation of key historical features of the Armidale High School and for preservation of the history of both schools.

== Notable alumni ==
- Don Aitkin – political scientist, academic administrator, writer
- Heather Anderson – academic, writer
- David Foster – novelist, essayist, poet and farmer (also attended Orange High School and Fort Street High School)
- David Franklin – actor
- John Knight – diplomat, ministerial adviser, politician
- Fergus Lupton – musician
- Brendan Moar – presenter of By Design, Future Gardens and Moar Gardening on The LifeStyle Channel
- John Monckton – swimmer, Olympic and Empire Games medallist and World Record holder
- Edward St John – barrister and politician. Boarded at St John's Hostel
- Brenda Walker – academics and writer, daughter of writer Shirley Walker, sister of singer Don Walker
- Peter Woolnough, better known as Peter Allen – singer and performer
- Michele Bullock – economist

== See also ==
- List of defunct government schools in New South Wales
- Duval High School
