= Armidale Secondary College =

Location
- Armidale, New South Wales; Australia; 30°31′11″S 151°39′07″E

Information
- Type: Government-funded co-educational comprehensive secondary day school
- Motto: Our Future. Our Learning.
- Established: 2019; 7 years ago
- Educational authority: New South Wales Department of Education
- Teaching staff: 96.6 FTE (2023)
- Enrolment: 1,113 (2023)
- Campus type: Regional
- Colours: Navy blue and Teal
- Website: armidale-s.schools.nsw.gov.au

Armidale Secondary College (abbreviated as ASC) is a government-funded co-educational dual modality partially academically selective and comprehensive secondary day school, located in Armidale, New South Wales, Australia.

== History ==
The school was established in 2019 with the amalgamation of Duval High School and Armidale High School. The school was developed on the old Armidale High School campus. Whilst the new campus underwent construction, the Duval High School Campus was used as a temporary school site from 2019 to 2020.

The school was announced in 2017, with the campus opening in 2021 with a capacity of approximately 1,500 students.

Initially the budget for the new campus was announced to be $65 million, however the final cost ended up at approximately $121 million. It was built by Richard Crookes Constructions which finished construction in October 2020.

== Principals ==
Period	Details
2019–2020	Carolyn Lasker and Stafford Cameron (Co-principals)
2020–2021	Carolyn Lasker
2021–2023	Bree Harvey-Bice
2024	Sarah Travis (Acting)
2024–present	Kim Allford

== Campus ==
The school includes 79 learning spaces, specialist learning spaces, sports courts, car parking, an indigenous garden and a wetlands walk. A multipurpose hall is located on the campus and is stated to be the largest indoor community multi-sport and entertainment facility in the Northern Tablelands.

=== Armidale Intensive English Centre ===
Situated on the Armidale Secondary College grounds is the Armidale Intensive English Centre which provides intensive English tuition to newly arrived high school aged migrants, refugees and international students. As well as English, subjects such as mathematics, science, HSIE, computer studies, PDHPE and Sport are taught as well. Students are expected to study for 20-40 weeks until they are able to transfer to high school.

== See also ==
- Education in Australia
- List of government schools in New South Wales
