= Armidale Express =

The Armidale Express
- Founded: 1856
- Headquarters: 115 Faulkner Street, Armidale NSW
- Website: armidaleexpress.com.au

The Armidale Express is a newspaper published in Armidale, a city in the Northern Tablelands, New South Wales.

Its frequency is weekly. The Express is read by approximately 5,000 readers in Armidale, Uralla, Guyra and Walcha areas.

== History ==
It began publication as The Armidale Express and New England General Advertiser from 1856 to 1929 and its frequency at the time was bi-weekly. William Hipgrave and Walter Craigie established the newspaper and were the first editors, using the Express to promote their political views. They briefly sold the paper to Owen Gorman in 1858, but regained ownership in 1859. Editorials for the Express in the 1890s initially opposed moves towards Federation.

In 1929, the title was changed to The Armidale Express in 1929 and it remains in publication under that masthead. Its circulation increased from 2,673 in 1950 to 4,394 in 1970. It has absorbed three other local newspapers since 1929: the Armidale Chronicle in 1929, the Uralla Times in 1983, and the New Englander in 1999.

An arm, The Armidale Express Extra, was established in 1999 and won the top prize for journalism at the 2000 Country Press Association NSW Awards.

== Digitisation ==
Some editions of The Armidale Chronicle and The Armidale Express and New England General Advertiser have been digitised as part of the Australian Newspapers Digitisation Program of the National Library of Australia.

== See also ==
- List of newspapers in New South Wales
- List of newspapers in Australia
