= Fergus James =

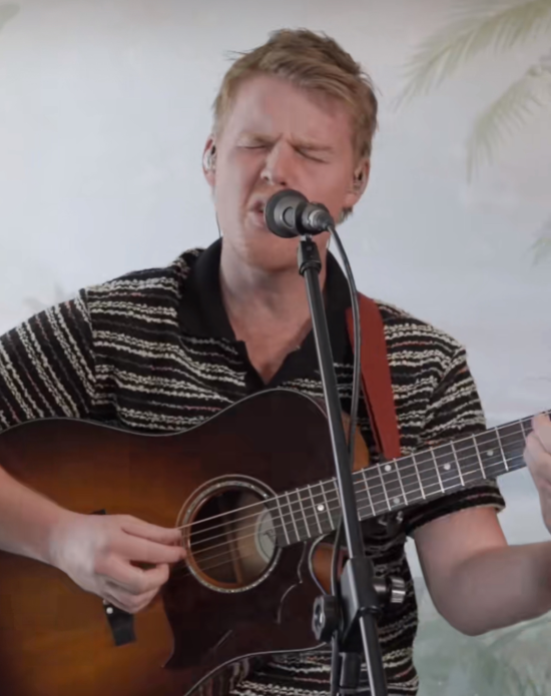

Background information
- Born: Fergus James Lupton; 30 May 1999 (age 27); Armidale, New South Wales, Australia
- Origin: Sydney, Australia
- Genres: Alternative rock; indie pop; pop rock
- Years active: 2018–present
- Label: Mushroom Group/100s + 1000s
- Website: fergusjamesmusic.com

Fergus James Lupton (born 30 May 1999), who performs as Fergus James is an Australian singer-songwriter-guitarist. He is known for his singles "Golden Age" and "What Are We Waiting For" as well as opening for Ed Sheeran on his ÷ Tour in 2018. "Golden Age" reached No. 12 on ARIA's Hitseekers Singles and No. 19 on Australian Artists Streaming charts. In late 2019 he played on the main stage at Splendour in the Grass.

== Biography ==
Fergus James Lupton, born in 1999 in Armidale, attended the local high school until he transferred to Newtown High School of the Performing Arts in 2016. In November of that year he was encouraged by Justin Timberlake to consider a music career. Timberlake had commented, "Your voice is really special. I'd put that on the radio now."

James' debut single, "Golden Age", was issued in early 2018, which received support from national youth radio Triple J. "Golden Age" is co-written by the artist with Mark Lizotte (p.k.a. Diesel) and Joel Quartermain (of Eskimo Joe). It peaked at No. 12 on ARIA Hitseekers Singles chart and No. 19 on related Australian Artists Streaming charts.

In March 2018 James supported Ed Sheeran on the Australia leg of the latter's ÷ Tour. James issued his debut extended play, All of the Colours, in November 2019. Its lead single, "What Are We Waiting For", appeared in late 2018. It was produced by Philip "Pip" Norman (ex-TZU), who co-wrote it with James and Michael Bywaters. The EP provided four more singles, all released in 2019. In March of that year the singer undertook his first headlining tour including dates in Armidale, Sydney and Melbourne. After winning a Triple J Unearthed competition, James performed on the main stage at Splendour in the Grass later that year.

The artist signed with Mushroom Group's label 100s + 1000s, which released his non-album single, "Good Man", in May 2020. It was co-written with its producer Frequency (as Bryan Fryzel) and Nat Dunn. He covered Benee's 2018 single "Soaked" for Triple J's Like a Version Volume Sixteen, (2020). Music Feeds' Laura English described it as "absolutely insane" as he "twists it into an indie-rock" rendition. A Slow Separation (2021), the singer-songwriter's second EP provided six singles. "Trouble" (2022) from the EP is described as "synth-inflected pop-rock" by Beat Magazine's writer.

== Discography ==
=== Extended plays ===
List of extended plays, with release date, label, and formats shown
Title	EP details
All of the Colours	Released: November 2019; Label: Formats: Digital download, streaming
A Slow Separation	Released: 2021; Label: 100s + 1000s; Formats: Digital download, streaming

=== As lead artist ===
List of singles as lead artist, with year released and album details shown
Title	Year	Album
"Golden Age"	2018	Non-album single
"What Are We Waiting For"	2018	All of the Colours
"Back to Life"	2019	All of the Colours
"Mistakes"	2019	All of the Colours
"Old Stars"	2019	All of the Colours
"Alive"	2019	All of the Colours
"Good Man"	2020	Non-album single
"Soaked"	2020	Non-album single
"Backseat"	2021	A Slow Separation
"Slow Separation"	2021	A Slow Separation
"Fall Short"	2021	A Slow Separation
"Saving Grace"	2021	A Slow Separation
"Better This Time"	2022	A Slow Separation
"Trouble"	2022	A Slow Separation
"Waking up with You"	2023	Let It Go
"Let It Go"	2023	Let It Go
