= Mary Kirkpatrick =

New South Wales Midwife

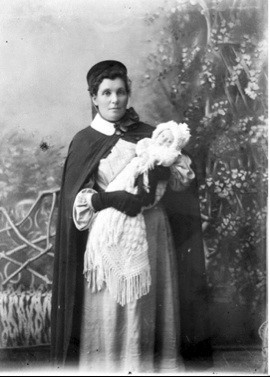
Nurse Mary Kirkpatrick, 1862-1943, with Casement baby, c.1903-1908, AMN807, Macleay River Historical Society, Angus McNeil Collection.

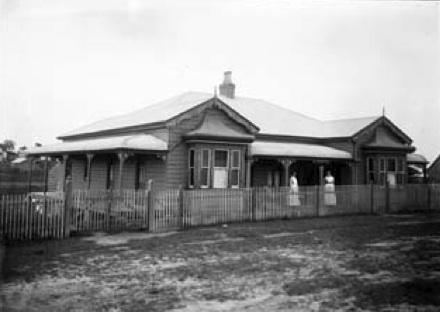
Hollywood Private Hospital, Marsh Street Kempsey, AMN0016419, courtesy of Macleay River Historical Society.

Mary Kirkpatrick (née Magee; November c. 1863–16 February 1943) was a pioneer of women's healthcare and the first trained midwife on the Mid North Coast of New South Wales. She established the first private maternity hospital, eventually establishing three more. Kirkpatrick worked with and mentored many of the midwives and nurses who followed her to the coast.

== Early life ==
Kirkpatrick was born around 1863 in Bridge End, Ballymacarrett, East Belfast to George McGee and his wife. Her father was a poulterer.

When Kirkpatrick married Hugh Kirkpatrick in 1880 in the Ballymacarrett Methodist Church, they moved to Howard Street South, placing them between the Protestant Shankill Road on one side and the Catholic Falls on the other. In 1884, Kirkpatrick, her husband Hugh, and David, their 11-month-old son, immigrated to New South Wales, leaving her mother, her sister Margaret, her brothers George and James, and her father, whom she never saw again.

Kirkpatrick never returned to Belfast but lived a long life in the Macleay Valley. Kirkpatrick worked with early doctors such as Brabazon Casement. Kirkpatrick became financially secure but gave much of it away for the good of her community.

== Midwife ==
At the age of twenty, Kirkpatrick immigrated to New South Wales with her husband, Hugh Kirkpatrick, and their 11-month-old David in 1884. After separating from Hugh in the late 1890s, Kirkpatrick became a midwife working in Armidale, an inland town.

In the 1900s, she moved to the Mid North Coast of New South Wales to the Macleay Valley along with David and a second son, George, where she would work and live for the rest of her life. She trained in midwifery in 1902 at the Home Training and Lying in Hospital in Sydney under the renowned midwife and lecturer Louisa Ardill and her staff. Kirkpatrick would eventually become one of the most well-known midwives in the Macleay Valley, caring for the health of women and babies for more than 30 years.

Kirkpatrick was the first trained midwife in Kempsey. Her first private hospital was established in River Street, West Kempsey in 1904. Her next private maternity was named The Poplars, also in River Street. She moved to Marsh Street, West Kempsey to open Hollywood, her third private maternity hospital. She advertised Hollywood in 1913. She resigned from Hollywood in 1915 with Martha Norman taking over its management. Her youngest son, George, was killed during the German attack on Lagincourt, France in April 1917, so Mary did not return to midwifery until 1922. In the intervening years, she turned to fundraise for the "boys coming home". She worked with the Red Cross and took part in many community events. Her grief drove her to support the war effort, but in particular, the wounded men who returned, some of whom she nursed in her own home. When Kirkpatrick returned to midwifery in 1922, she established her fourth private maternity hospital, named Down after County Down in Northern Ireland. She worked as a midwife until late 1937. When she became too ill to do it on her own, she began work for other midwives.

Mary Kirkpatrick died on 16 February 1943. In 2017, the BBC Television filmed the story of Nurse Kirkpatrick for their program Brave New World.

== Descendants ==
Nelson McCausland, descendant of Kirkpatrick, wrote the following in the Belfast Telegraph about her famous descendants:

Here's a question for readers. What is the connection between Mountpottinger Methodist Churst in east Belfast, a pioneer in women's health in Australia and the old humorous country song 'A pub with no beer?'

The answer to McCausland's question was Slim Dusty, who had the international hit country and western song "The Pub with No Beer," and who went on to become the most recorded performer in Australia. He was born David Gordon Kirkpatrick and was the grandson of Nurse Kirkpatrick.
