= Armidale =

- City
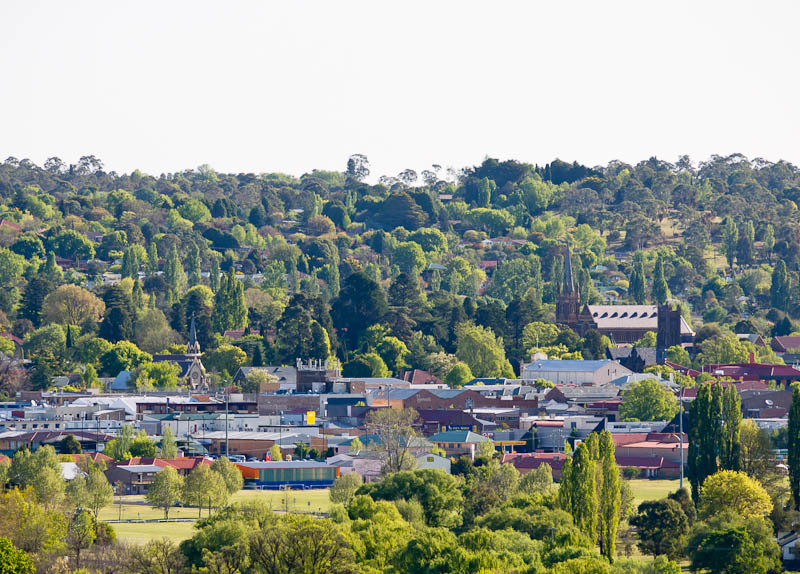
- Looking across Armidale city, December 2013

- Coordinates: 30°30′S 151°39′E
- Country: Australia
- State: New South Wales
- LGA: Armidale Regional Council
- Location: 105 km (65 mi) NE of Tamworth; 467 km (290 mi) SSW of Brisbane; 485 km (301 mi) NNE of Sydney; 190 km (120 mi) W of Coffs Harbour
- Established: 1849

Government
  - State electorate: Northern Tablelands
  - Federal division: New England
- Elevation: 980 m (3,220 ft)

Population
  - Total: 21,312 (UCL 2021)
- Postcode: 2350, 2351
- County: Sandon
- Mean max temp: 19.3 °C (66.7 °F)
- Mean min temp: 7.3 °C (45.1 °F)
- Annual rainfall: 811.4 mm (31.94 in)

Armidale is a city in the Northern Tablelands, New South Wales, Australia. Armidale had a population of 23,967 as of the 2021 census. It is the administrative centre for the Northern Tablelands region. It is approximately halfway between Sydney and Brisbane at the junction of the New England Highway and Waterfall Way.

Armidale is a rural university town, home to the University of New England (UNE). Armidale is located within the New England Renewable Energy Zone, which is expected to bring significant renewable energy development to the area.

== History ==
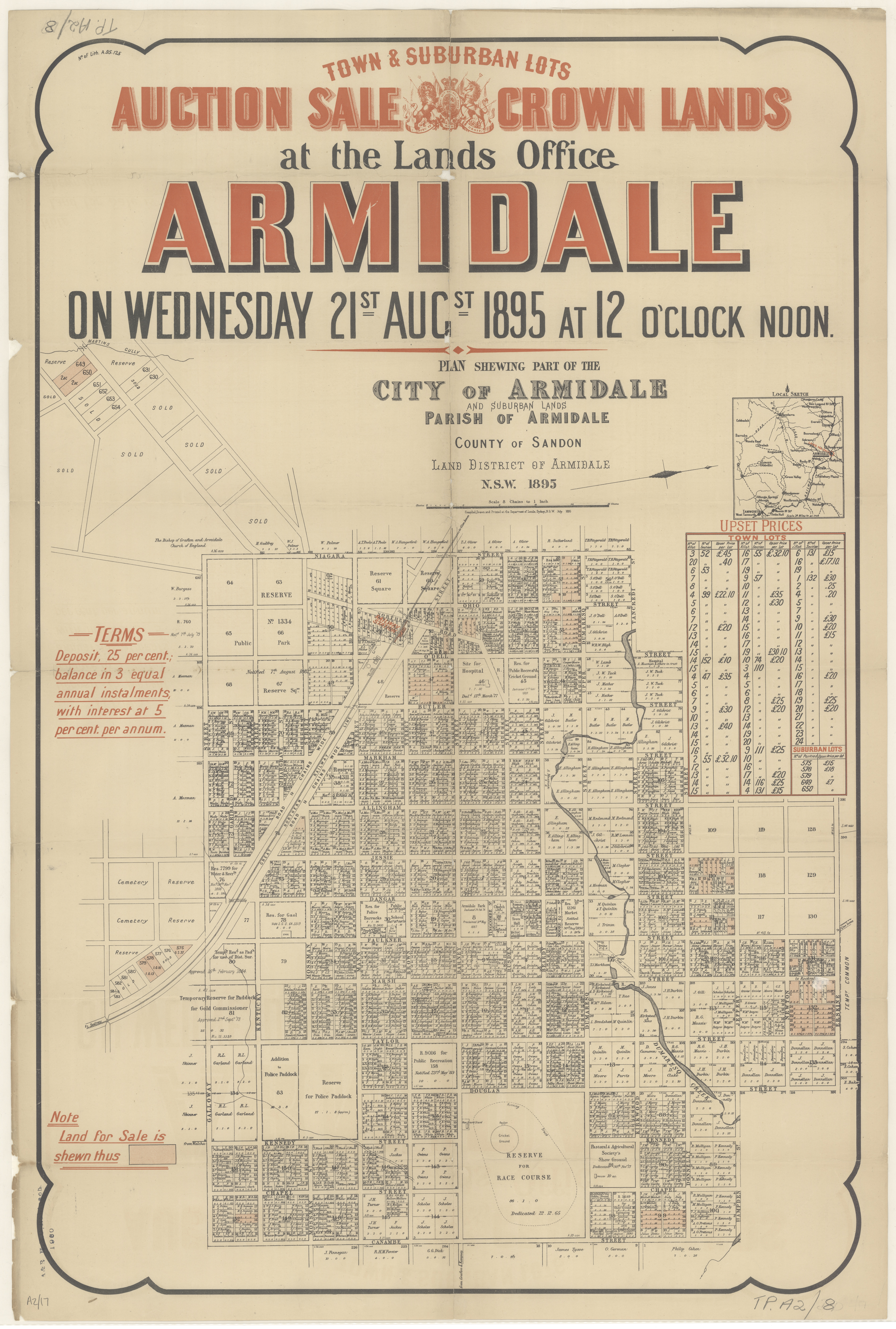
City of Armidale subdivision plan, 1895

Before the British colonial settlement of New South Wales, the indigenous Anaiwan tribe occupied the area that encompasses current day Armidale.

British pastoralists first entered the region in the early 1830s, following the earlier exploration of the area by John Oxley. Oxley recommended the region for grazing, and soon squatters established large leaseholds in the locality. Armidale was initially founded in 1839 by George James MacDonald who was the Commissioner of Crown Lands and head of the local Border Police detachment in the New England district. MacDonald established his barracks on the site and named it after Armadale on the Isle of Skye in Scotland which was the ancestral home of the MacDonald clan.

The James Barnet-designed heritage-listed Armidale Post Office opened on 1 April 1843. The town, which was surveyed in 1848 and gazetted in 1849, was established to provide a market and administration for the farms, but soon after gold was discovered at nearby Rocky River and Gara Gorges, and a gold rush ensued, enlarging the town rapidly in the 1850s. The nearby town of Uralla holds the grave of the famous Captain Thunderbolt – outlaw Fred Ward – who caused trouble in the area in the 1860s. As with Ned Kelly, the locals have adopted him as a larrikin hero and make the most of him as a tourist attraction.

Armidale became a municipality in 1863 and was proclaimed a city in 1885.

Although it does not lie between the two major cities of Sydney and Melbourne, a site just to the south of Armidale was, in the early 1900s, considered as a potential site for Australia's federal capital. Some saw its northerly location as better suited to all three eastern mainland states, including Queensland. Later, particularly in the 1920s and 1930s, Armidale was one of the centres of separatist agitation by the New England New State Movement. Local politician, David Drummond, a strong supporter of the movement, successfully lobbied for Armidale to have the second teachers' college in New South Wales, and later a university, positioning the town as a potential state capital.

== Geography ==
Armidale is on the banks of Dumaresq Creek, in the Northern Tablelands in the New England region about midway between Sydney and Brisbane at an altitude (980 m AHD) ranging from 970 metres at the valley's floor to 1,110 metres above sea level at the crests of the hills. A short distance to the east of Armidale are heavily forested steep gorges dropping down to the eastern coastal plain. Large parts of the highlands are covered by Palaeozoic aged metamorphosed sedimentary rocks. Intruding into these meta-sediments are granite plutons which decompose to form sandy soil, slightly deficient in nutrients. There are also basalt flows which are more fertile for the soil substrates. Those areas away from the deep gorge country tend to display gently undulating terrain mainly used for pastures and where granites occur the areas are usually covered in bushland.

The area contains a number of places of outstanding natural beauty and scientific interest as well as several World Heritage national parks including the New England National Park and the Oxley Wild Rivers National Park. To the west is Mount Yarrowyck Nature Reserve. The critically endangered New England Peppermint Grassy Woodland is the main vegetation community in the region.

The coastal plain can be reached directly at Coffs Harbour via Waterfall Way to Dorrigo and Bellingen on the Bellinger River, a two-hour drive.

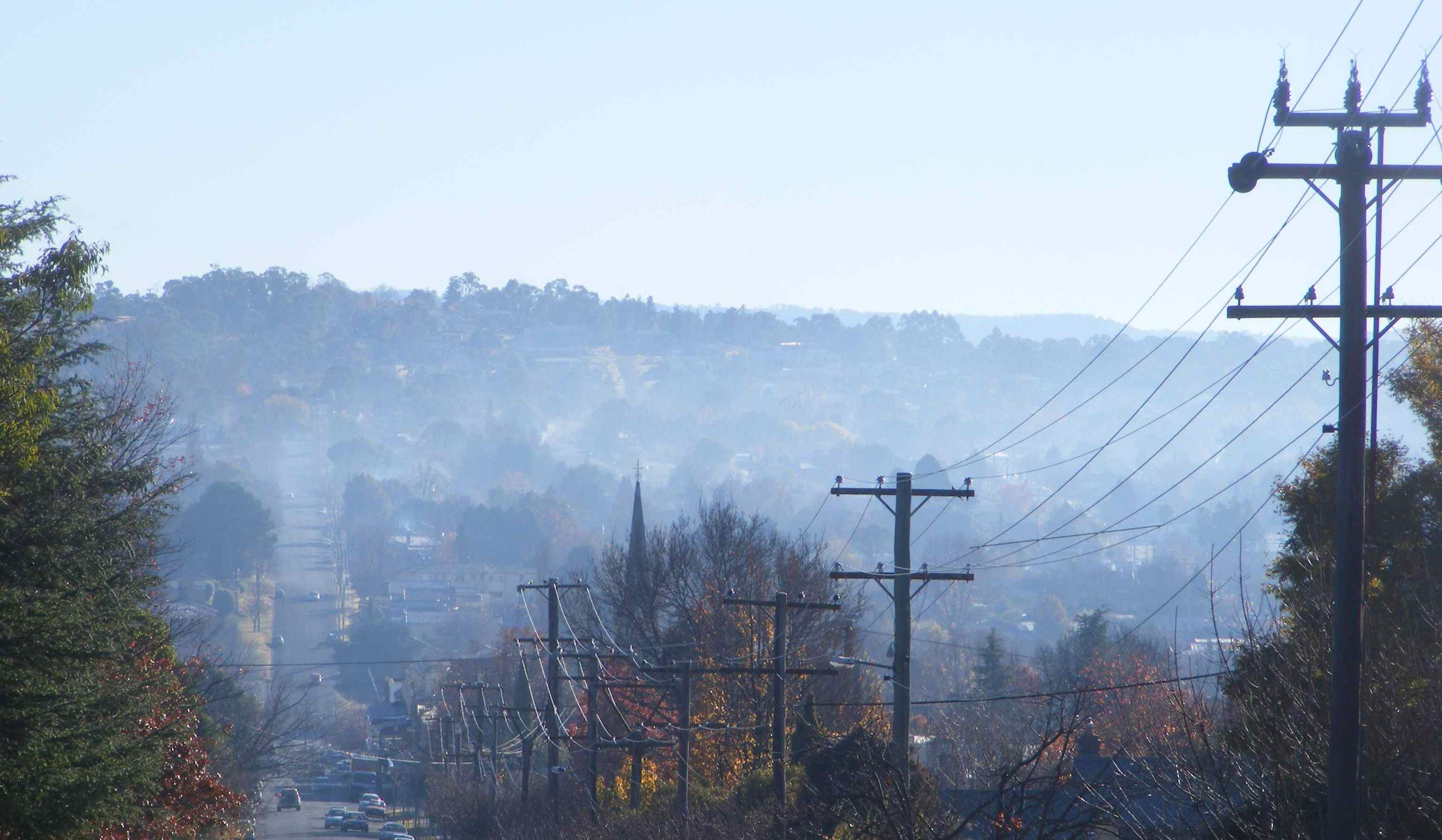
Woodsmoke pollution, Armidale, 27 May 2011

During winter there is a problem with some air quality reduction caused by the use of solid fuel domestic wood heaters. A peer-reviewed study carried out by the University of New England in 2007 found winter woodsmoke causes 8.8 additional visits per day to GPs in Armidale for respiratory complaints, i.e., about 750 additional visits per year. Another peer-reviewed study estimated the use of wood heaters in Armidale was responsible for about 11.5 premature deaths per year with estimated annual health cost of $14.95 million – about $4720 per year for every woodheater in the city.

=== Climate ===
Armidale has a subtropical highland climate (Köppen: Cfb). Armidale's elevation gives it a milder climate than most of northern New South Wales, but the summers are still very warm. Winters are long and cool, with many frosty nights. Snowfall is somewhat rare, on average only one day in every three years.

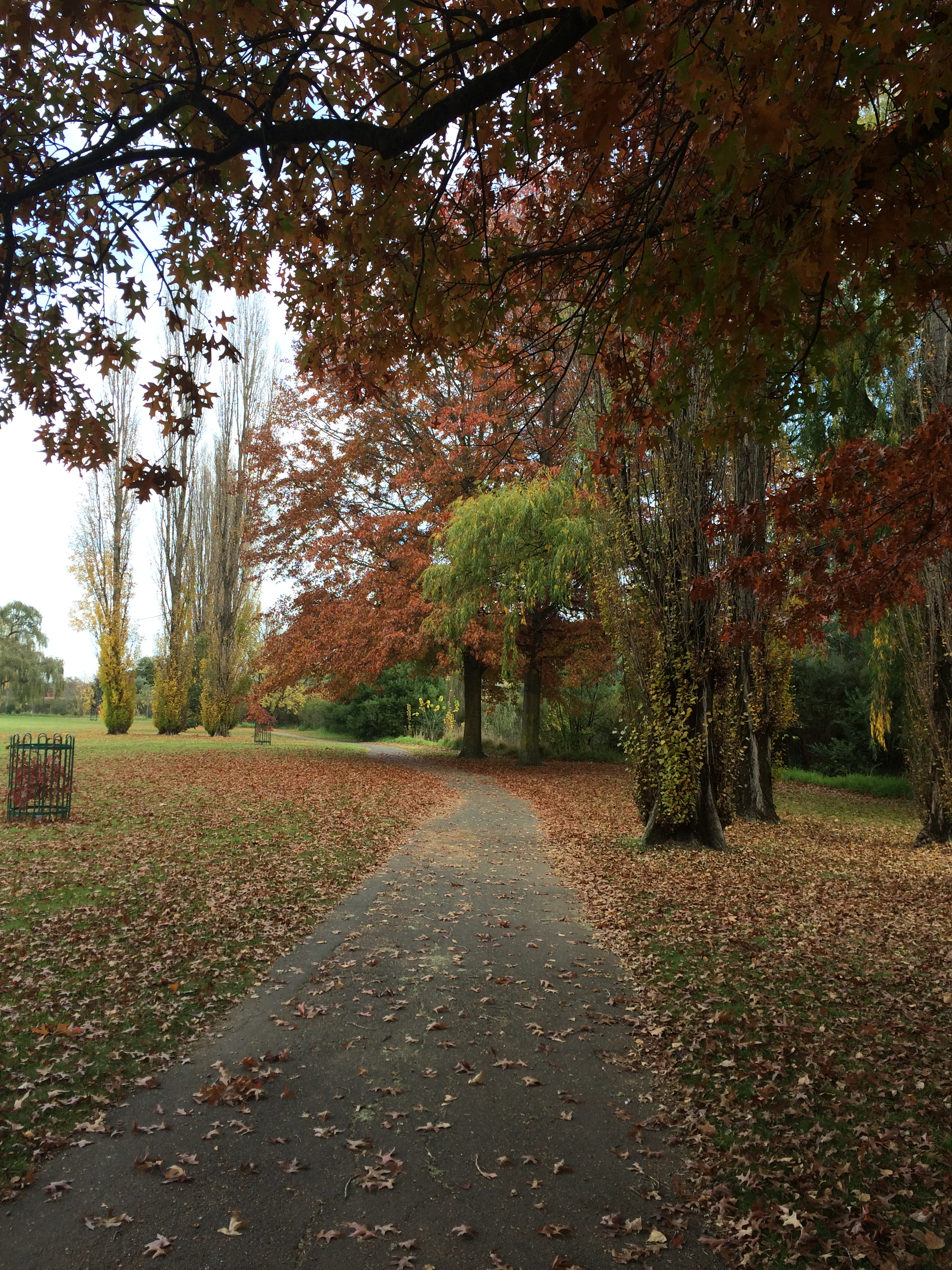
Rologas Fields during autumn

In Armidale, the presence of four distinct seasons makes it climatically unlike much of inland Australia; hence, the "New England" moniker and the autumn colours are notable features of the city. Summers are characterised by warm to very warm days followed almost always by cool, sometimes cold, nights. Thunderstorms often produce heavy falls of rain and occasionally hail in the afternoons and early evenings, also bringing a sudden drop in temperature. Unlike nearby coastal areas, Armidale does not usually experience high humidity levels making most of the summer days quite comfortable. Temperatures exceed 30 °C or 86 °F on an average of 13 afternoons per year, but rarely reach higher than 35 °C or 95 °F. The highest temperature recorded at Armidale Airport was 37.1 °C (98.8 °F), recorded in February 2017. As the leaves turn yellow and fall, day temperatures are mostly still warm, particularly in March and April. Days are sunny, the thunderstorm season is over, and rain becomes more sporadic. Nights become colder, and residents often awake to a thick fog blanketing the Armidale valley, but by 9 am fogs have cleared to be followed by a bright sunny day. The year's first frosts usually occur in April, but they are not severe.

Winters are cold; overnight temperatures drop below −5 °C or 23 °F with frost on the ground; at the Tree Group Nursery station a reading as low as −11.2 °C or 11.8 °F was record on 30 June 2010, whilst the older station at Radio 2AD recorded −9.3 °C or 15.3 °F on 15 July 1970. These cold frosty mornings are usually followed by sunny days. Day temperatures may make it as high as 16 °C or 60.8 °F, but sometimes may not climb beyond 10 °C or 50 °F. These are typical Northern Tablelands winter days with westerly winds, bleak grey clouds, and showers of rain and very occasionally snow. Rainfall during the winter months is not infrequent but is usually light.

In spring temperatures are warmer, although occasional morning frosts still can continue well into October. September is usually a pleasantly mild but windy month, and by late October with increasing heat and humidity the thunderstorm season is starting with increasing rainfalls. The spring months produce the most variable weather of the year. A week of very warm sunny weather can be followed by several milder days with temperatures right back at winter levels before gradually warming up again. This cycle often repeats itself many times until the start of summer.

Climate data for Armidale (Tree Group Nursery, 1997–2023); 987 m AMSL; 30.52° S, 151.67° E
Month	Jan	Feb	Mar	Apr	May	Jun	Jul	Aug	Sep	Oct	Nov	Dec	Year
Record high °C (°F)	37.4 (99.3)	37.6 (99.7)	33.8 (92.8)	28.0 (82.4)	24.8 (76.6)	22.3 (72.1)	21.2 (70.2)	27.4 (81.3)	28.7 (83.7)	32.4 (90.3)	35.6 (96.1)	37.8 (100.0)	37.8 (100.0)
Mean daily maximum °C (°F)	27.1 (80.8)	25.7 (78.3)	23.8 (74.8)	20.5 (68.9)	16.6 (61.9)	13.5 (56.3)	13.2 (55.8)	14.9 (58.8)	18.6 (65.5)	21.4 (70.5)	23.5 (74.3)	25.7 (78.3)	20.4 (68.7)
Mean daily minimum °C (°F)	13.0 (55.4)	12.7 (54.9)	10.8 (51.4)	6.8 (44.2)	2.3 (36.1)	0.8 (33.4)	−0.3 (31.5)	−0.2 (31.6)	2.8 (37.0)	6.0 (42.8)	9.2 (48.6)	11.5 (52.7)	6.3 (43.3)
Record low °C (°F)	2.6 (36.7)	2.5 (36.5)	−1.7 (28.9)	−5.8 (21.6)	−7.9 (17.8)	−11.2 (11.8)	−10.8 (12.6)	−8.7 (16.3)	−6.2 (20.8)	−3.5 (25.7)	−3.0 (26.6)	−0.5 (31.1)	−11.2 (11.8)
Average rainfall mm (inches)	89.4 (3.52)	96.6 (3.80)	73.9 (2.91)	37.2 (1.46)	31.8 (1.25)	40.6 (1.60)	40.1 (1.58)	45.4 (1.79)	46.3 (1.82)	70.6 (2.78)	92.7 (3.65)	90.6 (3.57)	755.2 (29.73)
Average rainy days (≥ 0.2mm)	11.1	11.6	10.9	8.3	7.8	10.5	9.5	8.3	8.1	10.4	11.3	11.8	119.6
Average afternoon relative humidity (%)	49	55	53	53	53	58	55	47	45	46	53	48	51
Source: Bureau of Meteorology

Climate data for Armidale Airport AWS (1994–2023); 1,079 m AMSL; 30.53° S, 151.62° E
Month	Jan	Feb	Mar	Apr	May	Jun	Jul	Aug	Sep	Oct	Nov	Dec	Year
Record high °C (°F)	37.0 (98.6)	37.1 (98.8)	32.4 (90.3)	27.7 (81.9)	23.3 (73.9)	21.7 (71.1)	19.9 (67.8)	26.8 (80.2)	28.2 (82.8)	31.9 (89.4)	35.0 (95.0)	36.5 (97.7)	37.1 (98.8)
Mean daily maximum °C (°F)	26.2 (79.2)	25.0 (77.0)	23.1 (73.6)	19.8 (67.6)	15.8 (60.4)	12.7 (54.9)	12.2 (54.0)	14 (57)	17.6 (63.7)	20.5 (68.9)	22.8 (73.0)	25.0 (77.0)	19.6 (67.3)
Mean daily minimum °C (°F)	13.5 (56.3)	13.1 (55.6)	11.5 (52.7)	7.8 (46.0)	4.4 (39.9)	2.4 (36.3)	1.4 (34.5)	1.8 (35.2)	4.7 (40.5)	7.4 (45.3)	10.0 (50.0)	12.1 (53.8)	7.5 (45.5)
Record low °C (°F)	4.5 (40.1)	4.1 (39.4)	1.1 (34.0)	−3.3 (26.1)	−5.9 (21.4)	−6.0 (21.2)	−7.0 (19.4)	−6.6 (20.1)	−4.9 (23.2)	−3.1 (26.4)	−1.6 (29.1)	1.3 (34.3)	−7.0 (19.4)
Average rainfall mm (inches)	91.9 (3.62)	96.1 (3.78)	67.7 (2.67)	35.1 (1.38)	40.4 (1.59)	48.2 (1.90)	44.0 (1.73)	43.2 (1.70)	52.1 (2.05)	74.7 (2.94)	95.8 (3.77)	102.9 (4.05)	792.1 (31.18)
Average rainy days (≥ 0.2mm)	12.1	13.0	12.7	11.2	12.1	14.9	13.4	9.9	10.1	11.5	12.5	13.2	146.6
Average afternoon relative humidity (%)	52	58	53	49	55	60	56	48	46	46	54	51	52
Source: Bureau of Meteorology

=== Weather ===
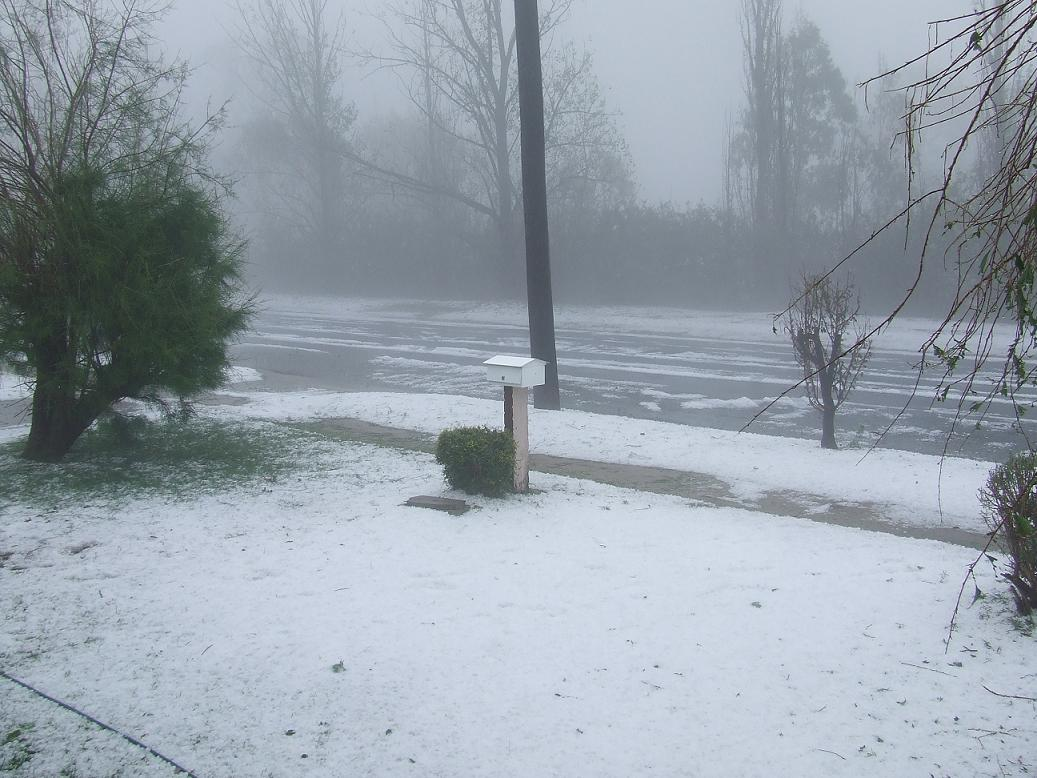
21 December 2006 hailstorm

Armidale has been prone to severe hailstorms and experienced three such storms over the ten-year period from 1996 to 2006.

On 29 September 1996 hail of up to 80 millimetres (3.1 in) in diameter and southerly winds of up to 150 kilometres per hour (93 mph) were reported at the airport weather station. The area was declared a disaster zone and State Emergency Service crews were brought in from across the state. Damage was estimated to be in excess of A$200 million.

On 1 January 2000 many homes were damaged by extreme weather conditions which brought large hail stones, strong winds and flash flooding.

On 21 December 2006 hail stones, high winds and flash flooding damaged more than 1,000 homes and destroyed the Armidale Livestock Exhibition Centre which collapsed entirely under the weight of accumulated hail. The city was declared a state of emergency by New South Wales Premier Morris Iemma the following day.

On the night of 14 October 2021 at 10pm, an intense storm produced a tornado causing extensive damage. It tore away roofs and turned vehicles upside down.

== City of Armidale ==
Armidale is a cathedral city, being the seat of the Anglican and Roman Catholic bishops of Armidale. St Peter's Anglican Cathedral, which replaced the original St Peter's Church, was designed by the Canadian architect John Horbury Hunt, who also designed Booloominbah at the University of New England. St Peter's Cathedral opened for worship in 1875 and the tower was added in 1938. The Catholic Cathedral of St Mary and St Joseph was dedicated on 12 December 1919.

The city centre is laid out in a grid of streets. The main street is called Beardy Street, named for two of the founding settlers who had beards. The court house was built in the 1850s and is still a prominent feature of the central district. Much of the rest of the city is residential.

The Australian Wool Fashion Awards, which showcases the use of Merino wool by fashion designers, are hosted by Armidale in March each year. The Autumn Festival is a popular annual event of April in Armidale. The festival features a street parade, stalls and celebrations throughout the city. It is a regular part of the city's attractions, often promoting Armidale's diverse culture (for instance, posters set up by council attempt to attract tourists with the motto "Foodies Thrive in Armidale") and autumn colours. During May the annual New England Wool Expo is staged to display wool fashions, handicrafts, demonstrations, shearing competitions, yard dog trials and demonstrations, a wool bale rolling competition and other activities.

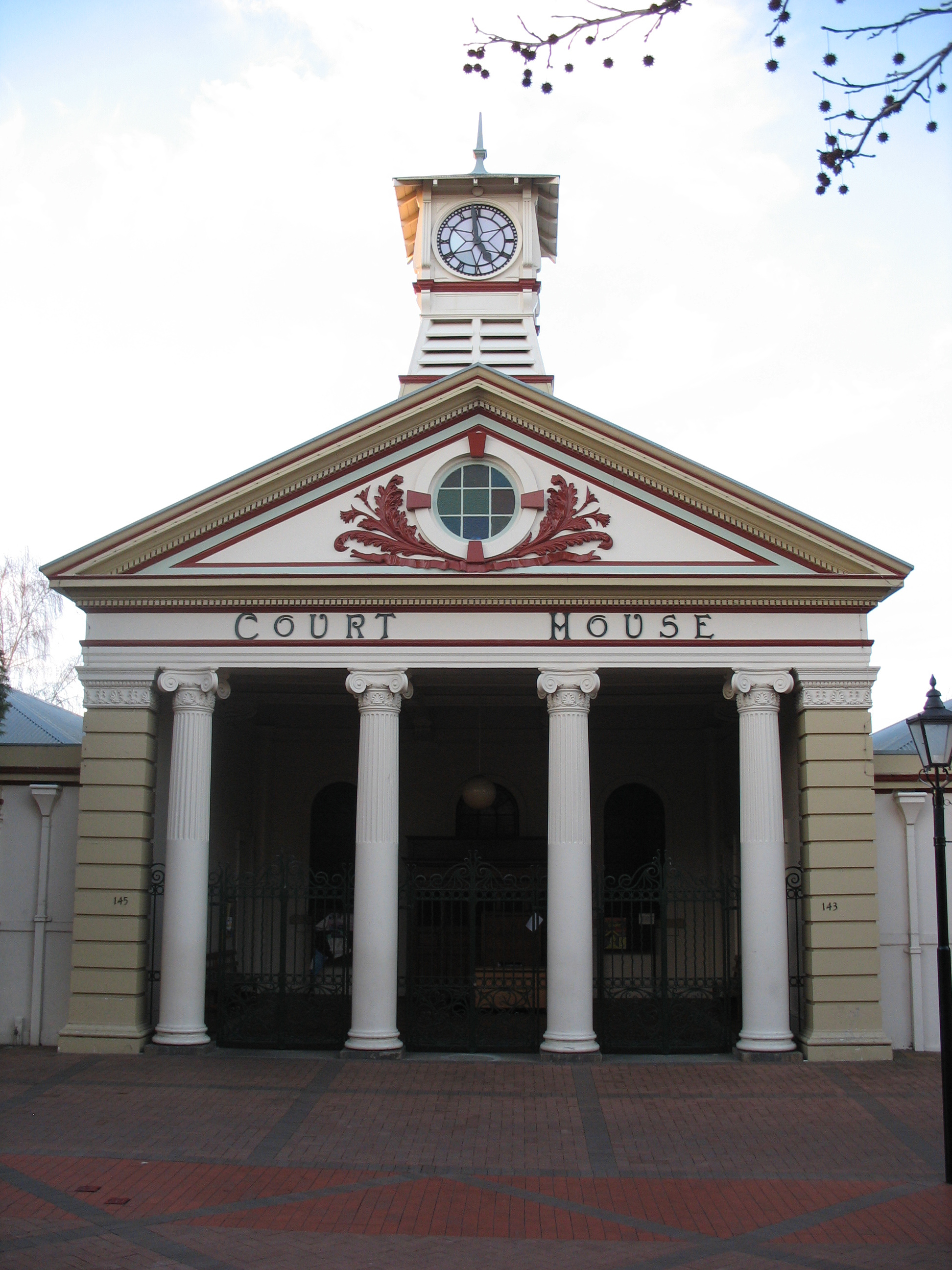
The former Armidale Courthouse

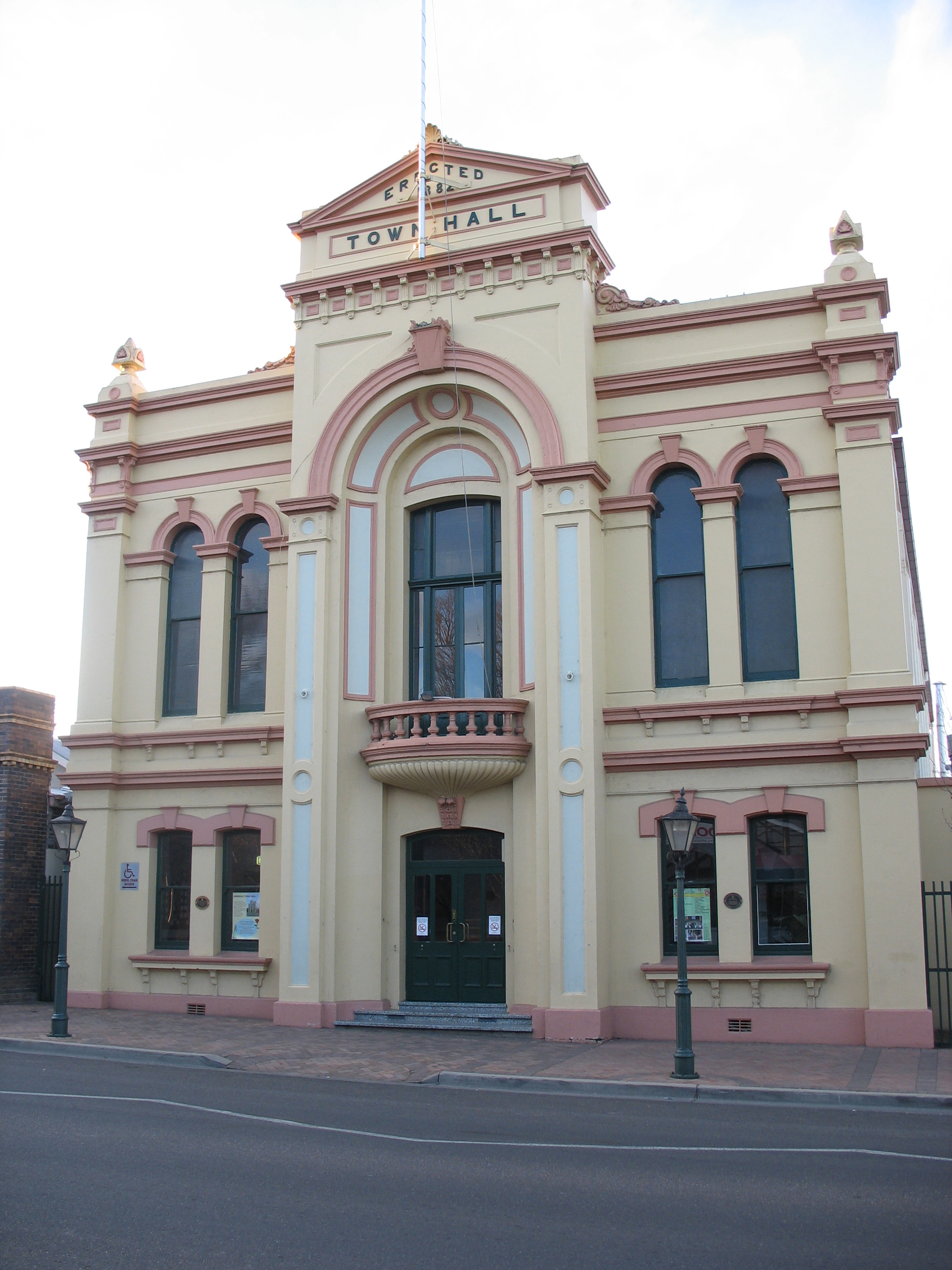
Armidale Town Hall

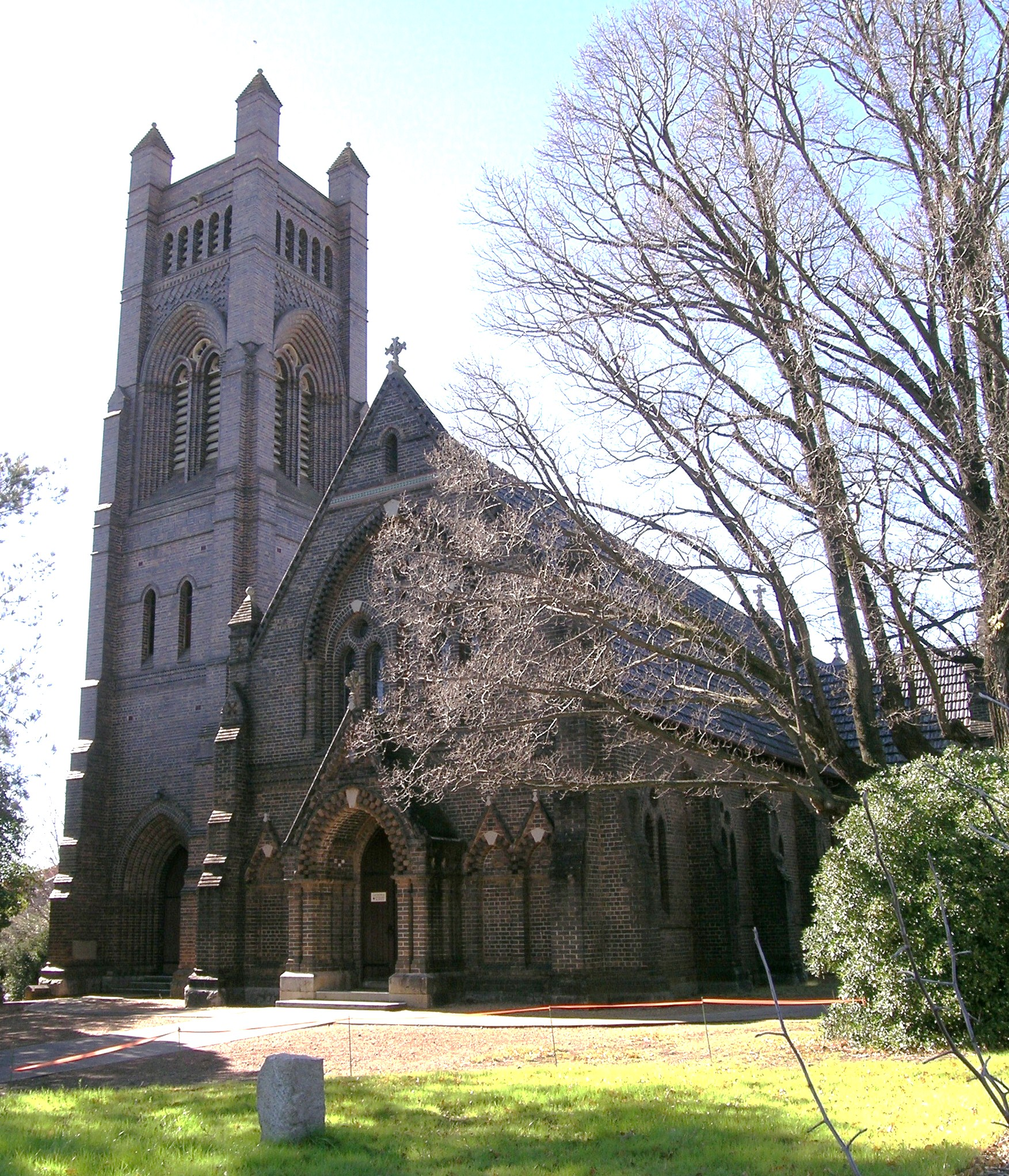
St Peter's Cathedral

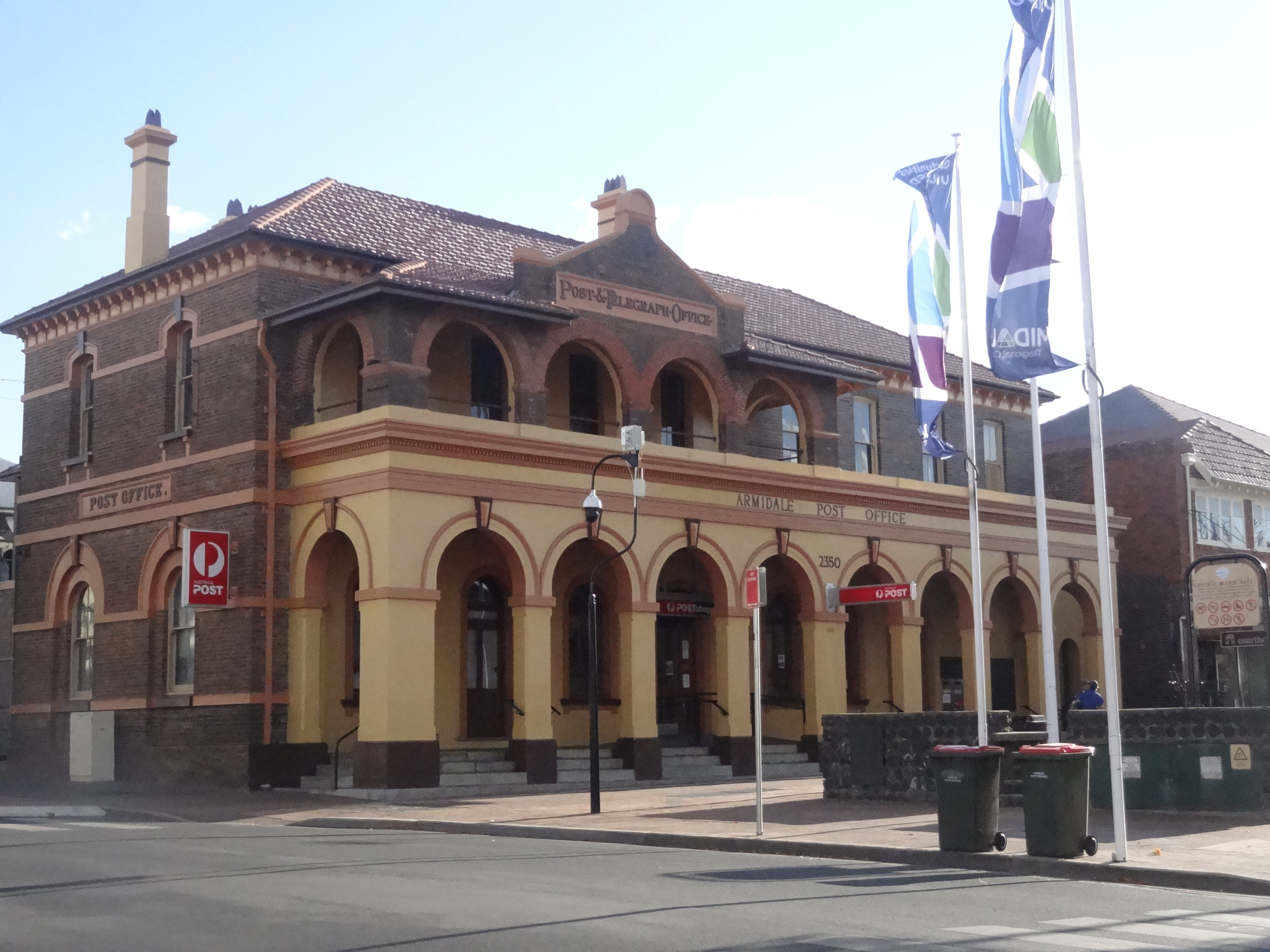
Armidale Post Office

== Demographics ==
Historical population
Year	Pop.	±%
1921	5,407	—
1933	6,794	+25.7%
1947	7,809	+14.9%
1954	8,661	+10.9%
1961	12,875	+48.7%
1966	15,360	+19.3%
1971	18,156	+18.2%
1976	19,711	+8.6%
1981	18,922	−4.0%
1986	19,525	+3.2%
1991	21,605	+10.7%
1996	21,330	−1.3%
2001	20,068	−5.9%
2006	21,660	+7.9%
2011	22,468	+3.7%
2016	23,352	+3.9%
2021	23,967	+2.6%
Source: Australian Bureau of Statistics data.

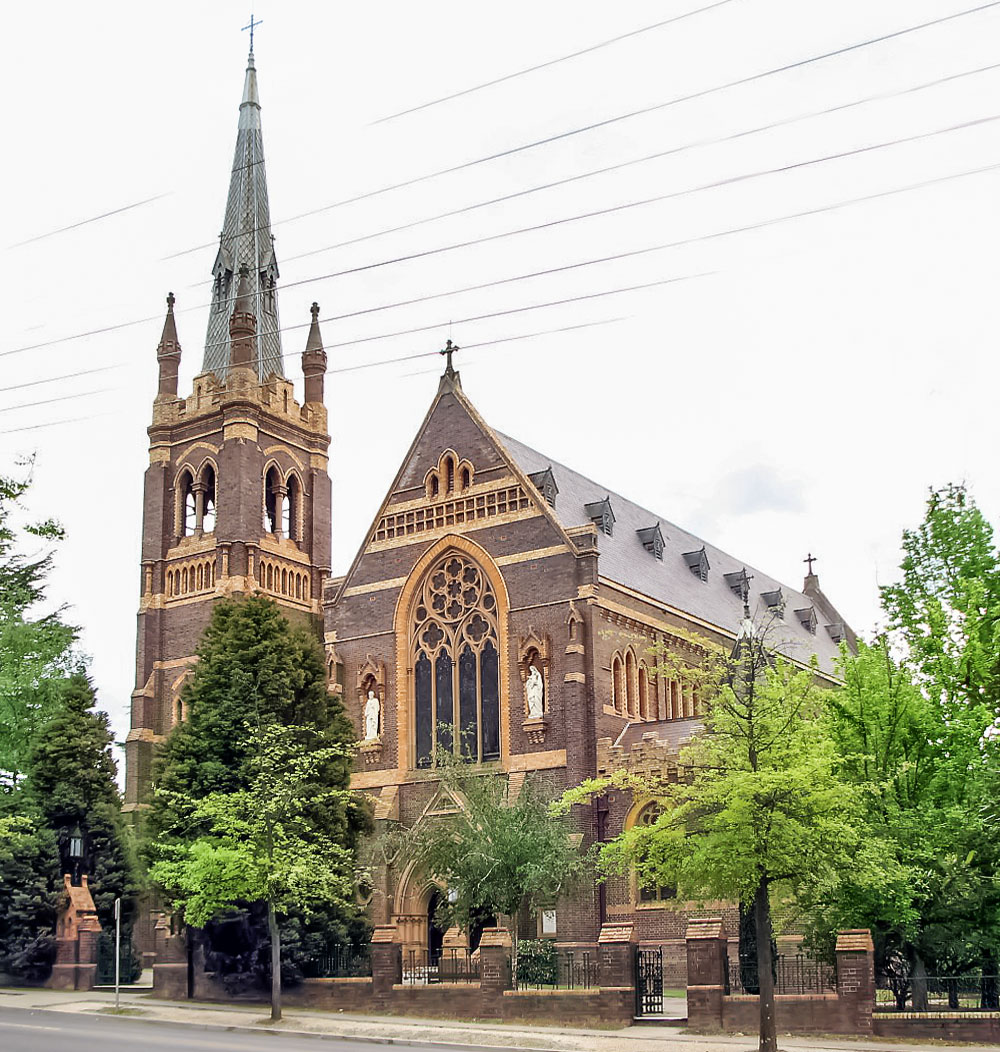
The Catholic Cathedral of St Mary and St Joseph, Armidale

According to the 2021 census, there were 23,967 people in the Armidale significant urban area.

- Aboriginal and Torres Strait Islander people made up 7.9% of the population.
- 74.0% of people were born in Australia. The next most common countries of birth were Iraq 2.4%, England 2.0%, India 1.1%, Nepal 1.1%, and New Zealand 1.0%.
- 78.6% of people only spoke English at home. Other languages spoken at home included Kurdish 1.1%, Nepali 1.1% and Mandarin 0.7%.
- The most common responses for religion were No Religion 36.1%, Catholic 16.7% and Anglican 16.1%.

Armidale is home to a Êzidî community of approximately 650.

== Suburbs ==
- Acacia Park
- Armidale (central business district)
- Ben Venue
- Bona Vista
- Commissioners Waters
- Dumaresq
- Duval
- Madgwick
- North Hill
- Newling
- Soudan Heights
- South Hill
- St. Patrick's
- The Mission

== Transport ==
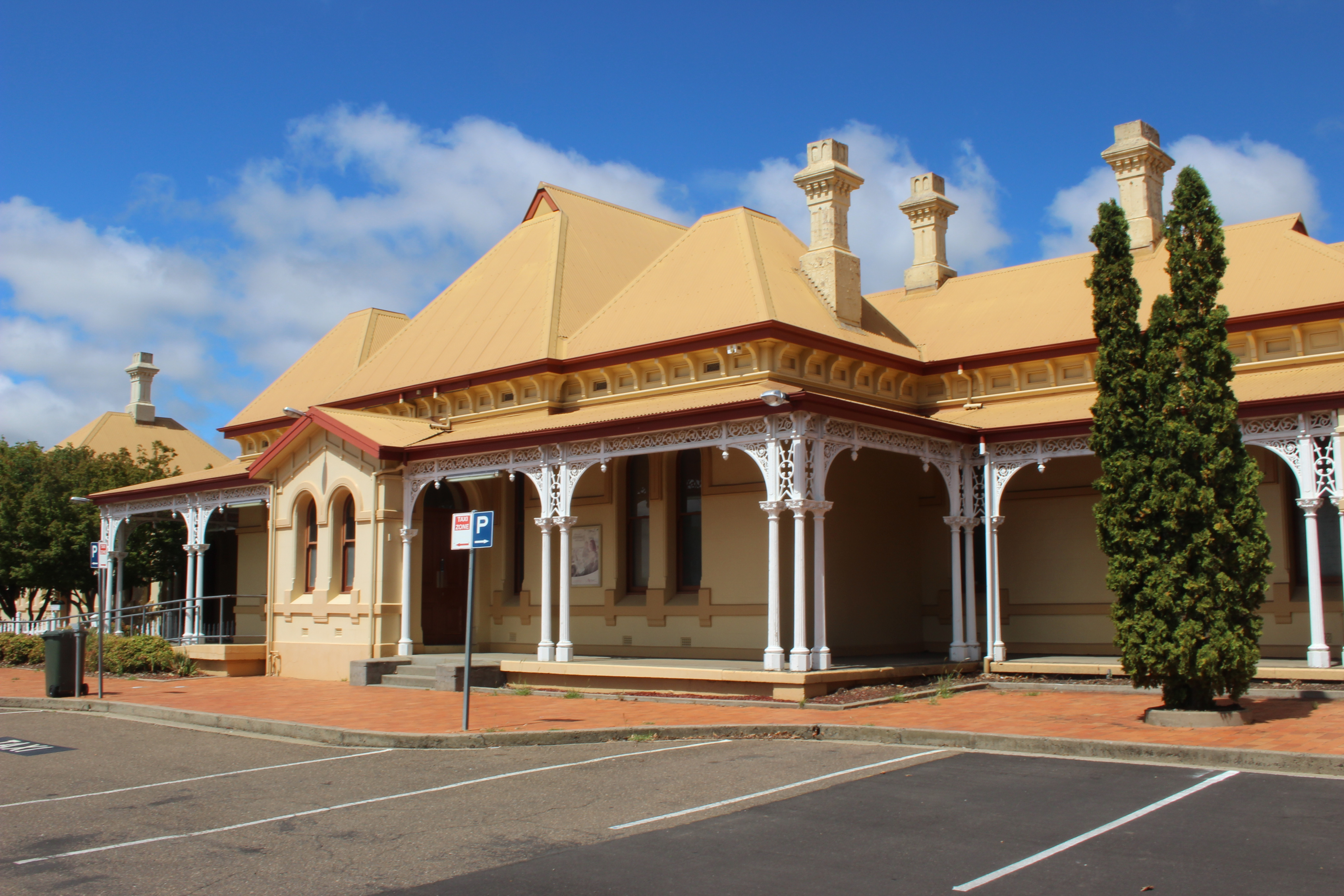
Armidale railway station opened in 1883.

The Armidale railway station is on the Main North railway line and is served by daily passenger trains to and from Sydney. Armidale's airport has five daily scheduled flights to and from Sydney with Qantaslink. Link Airways operates scheduled services between Armidale and Brisbane. Armidale Airport, at 1,084 metres (3,556 ft), is the highest licensed airport in New South Wales.

The city is linked further north by daily coach to Tenterfield provided by NSW TrainLink. Other bus companies such as Greyhound also provide numerous daily services. Local city services are provided on six different routes by Edwards Coaches and Armidale is serviced by 16 taxis.

Although the hills to the north and the south can be a challenge, cycling is an option to get around Armidale. A cycleway exists from the University of New England through the city to the residential areas on the eastern side of city. This cycleway snakes back towards Ben Venue School. The passage through the city provides easy access for cyclists to the shopping centres. Bicycle racks are in strategic locations around the city centre, including at The Armidale Food Emporium, The Armidale Plaza, and Centro Armidale. Places are also provided outside the Armidale Dumeresq War Memorial Library, and at either end of the Mall. A maze of marked cycleways on the shoulder of the roads in the city's southern residential areas allows cyclists to safely ride on the roads. There are also separate cycleways from the Armidale Arboretum along Kellys Plains Road to the south and from the north of the city along Rockvale Road to the Armidale State Forest (known as the Pine Forest by locals).

== Education ==
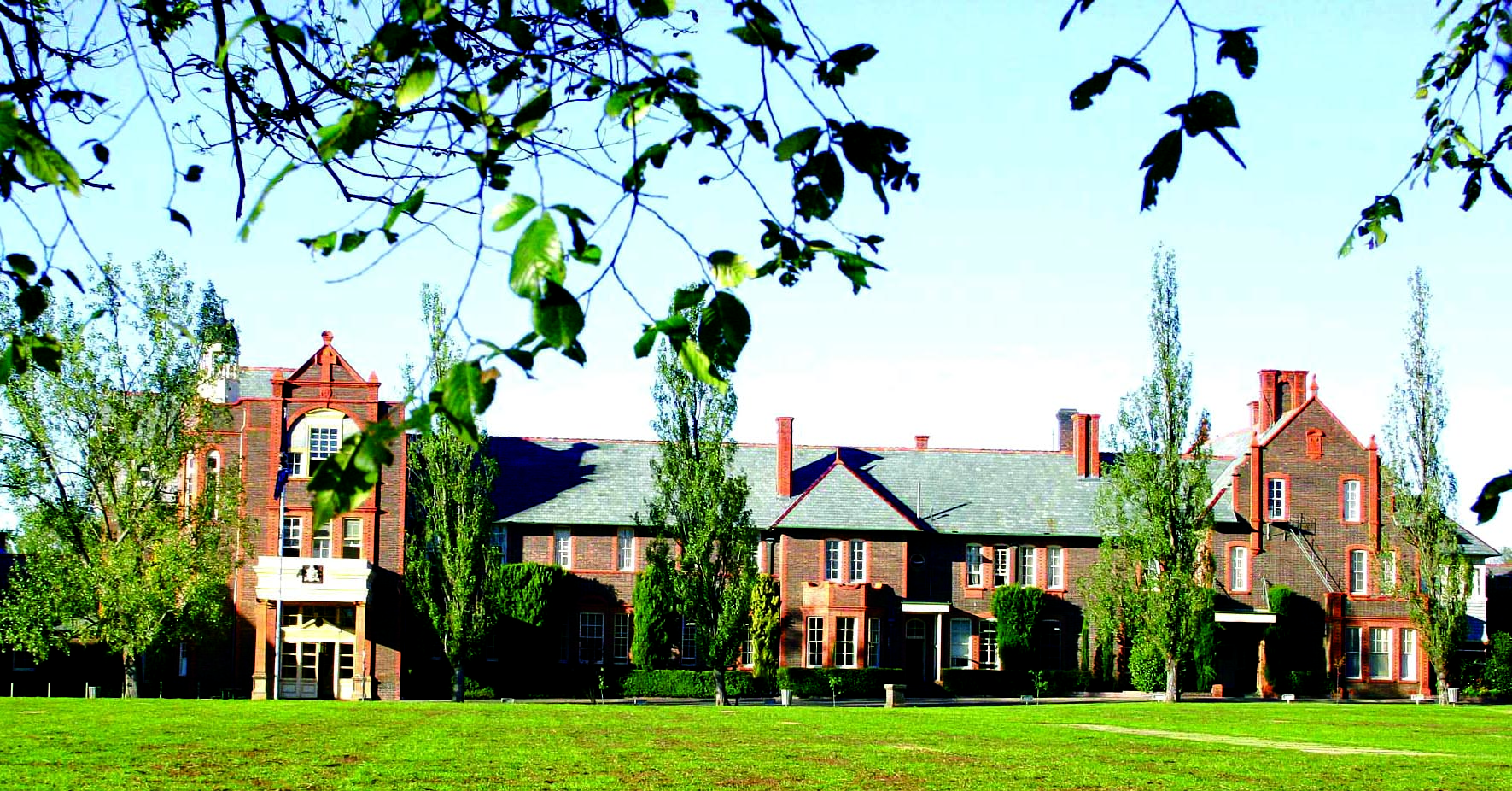
The Armidale School

The city is home to a large number of education facilities, including The Armidale School (1894), New England Girls' School (1895), Presbyterian Ladies' College (PLC Armidale) (1887), and the Armidale Waldorf School (1985), schools of the Australian independent education sector. O'Connor Catholic College (1975) and St Mary's Primary School are systemic Catholic schools. Armidale High School (1911) and Duval High School (1972) were government-funded secondary schools until their closing at the end of 2018. In 2019, the two schools were combined into one in the form of Armidale Secondary College, which is located on what was the Armidale High School campus. It was previously located on the Duval High School campus as a placeholder while the Armidale High campus was partially demolished. Approximately 27% of Armidale's total population is in the 10–24-year age group, compared with an equivalent NSW figure of 18%.

=== University of New England ===
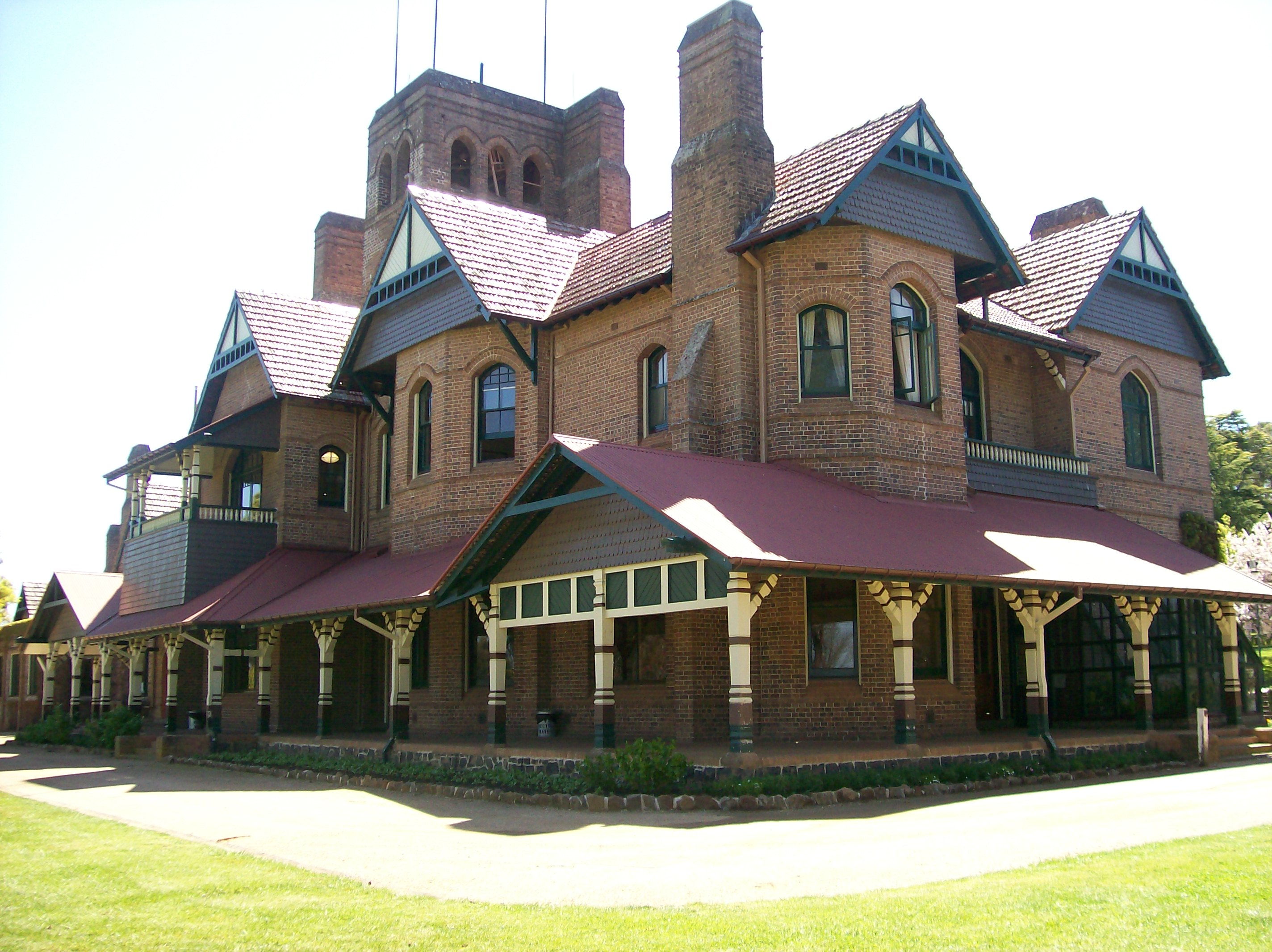
The University of New England

The university was founded in 1938, at first as a college of the University of Sydney, but then in its own right in 1954. The UNE contributes to Armidale's position as a city of culture and diversity, with a vibrant artistic and cultural element. The university has strong links to the rural community, and undertakes a lot of agricultural research. There is also a high-technology presence, as well as notable humanities teaching. UNE hosts a wide range of courses, and introduced a number of new courses in 2008, including a five-year Bachelor of Medical Science and Doctor of Medicine program as part of a joint medical program with the University of Newcastle. The university is built around the historic mansion Booloominbah, which is now used for administration and houses a restaurant. UNE is one of the city's main employers.

== Retail ==
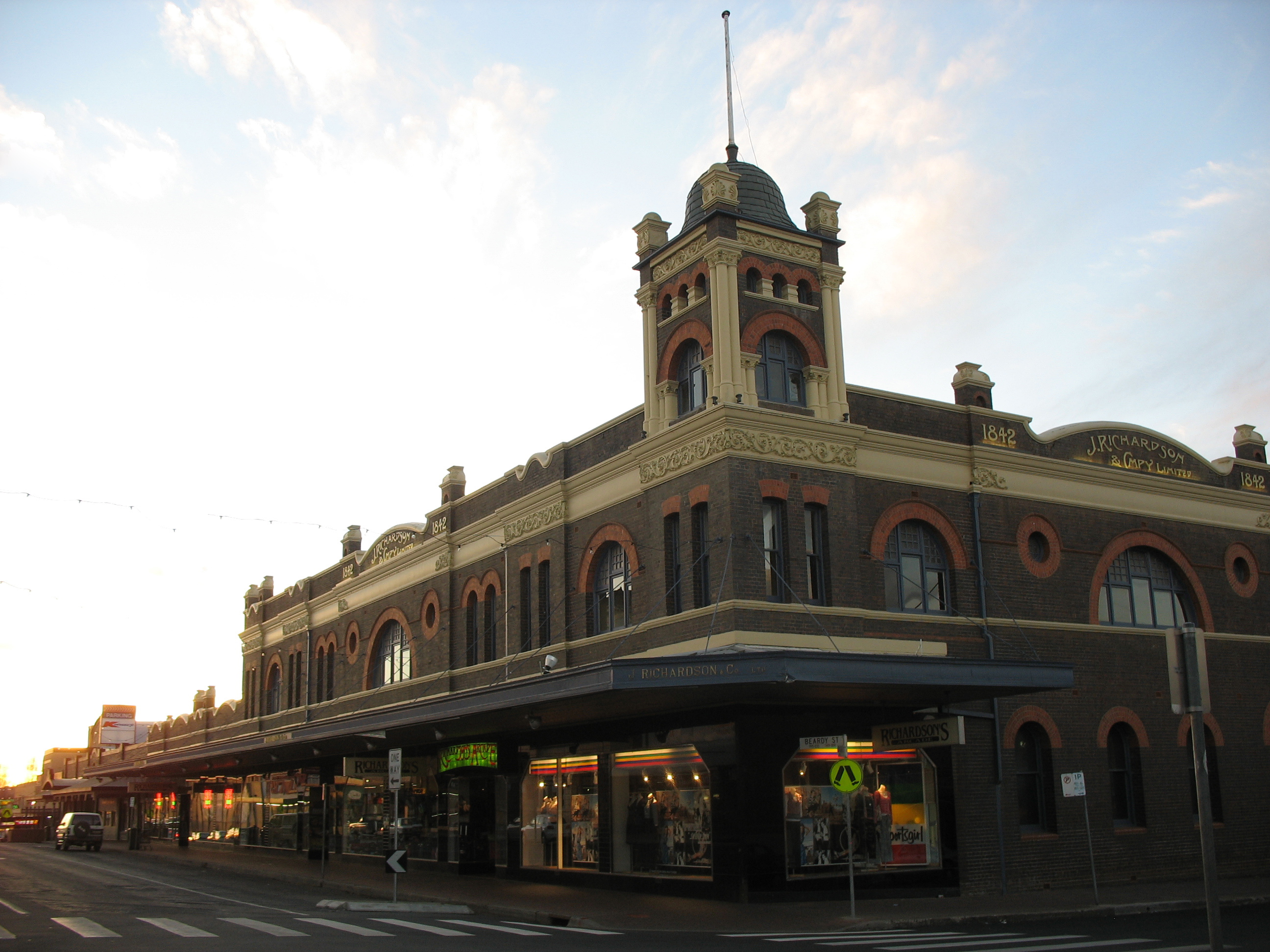
Richardson's Arcade

Armidale is a major regional retail centre, housing three shopping malls:

- Central Armidale. A A$49 million development anchored by a Woolworths, Kmart, EB Games, and 32 speciality stores. It began trading under the name 'Centro' in late November 2007, and was rebranded 'Central' in 2014.
- Armidale Plaza, a A$70 million venture, officially opened an extension, refurbishment and rebranding (formerly Kmart Plaza) in August 2007. Armidale Plaza is anchored by and 50 specialty stores.
- The East Mall was constructed in 2002 and houses Coles Supermarket and 15 speciality stores.

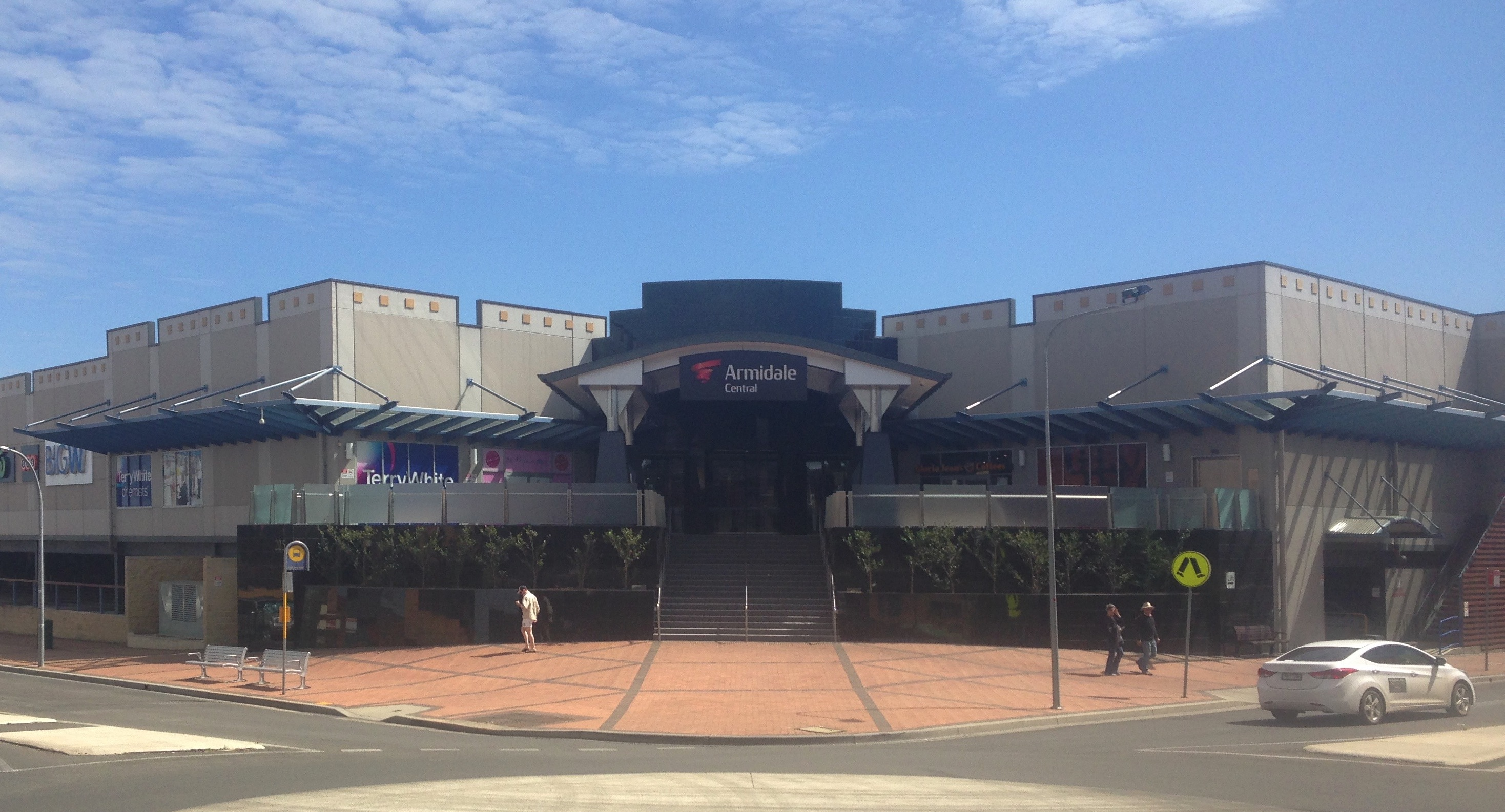
Central Armidale shopping mall

=== Mall ===
Armidale has a pedestrian mall which stretches over three blocks of Beardy Street in the centre of city. It features many shops and cafés with outdoor eating areas along with some notable architecture, including Tattersalls Hotel, built in the Art Deco style during the 1930s; Armidale Courthouse; the city's main post office; the former Commonwealth Bank and the New England Hotel. The mall was opened in 1973 and was the first of its kind in regional Australia. Armidale Dumaresq Council has been undertaking major upgrades to the mall since 2003 as part of the Armidale CBD Streetscape Design Project which aims at easing traffic in the city centre by creating an emphasis on the "ring road" around the CBD with the assistance of signage, elevation of roads using paving and the creation of one-way streets.

== Sport ==
The most popular sport in Armidale is rugby League. The city has four teams in the New England Rugby Union: Armidale Blues, Barbarians, Robb College, St. Albert's College, the latter two of which are made up of primarily university students staying on residence at the respective colleges.

A close second in popularity in the city is rugby league. Armidale has two teams competing in Group 19, the Armidale Rams RLFC, and the Narwan Eels, a club with a distinct Indigenous influence. The Rams are based at Rugby League Park on Dumaresq St in Central Armidale, whilst the Eels are based at Newling Oval on the southern outskirts of the city.

Other sports teams include the UNE New England Nomads (University AFL team) and various soccer teams in the local SportUNE League.

== Media ==
The city is serviced by one local newspaper, many radio stations including four local outlets, and all major television stations.

=== Local press ===
- Armidale Express
- Armidale Express Extra
- Armidale Independent, closed November 2014

=== Local radio ===
- TUNE! FM, one of Australia's oldest community radio stations aimed at a youth audience.
- 2AD/FM100.3, a commercial broadcaster owned by the SuperNetwork.
- 2ARM 92.1 FM, a community radio station staffed by volunteers and operating from premises in Kentucky Street with a Permanent Community Broadcasting Licence. See program guide at http://2arm.net.au
- 88.0 is a narrowcast tourist radio station.
- 87.6 Raw FM Australia (Dance Floor Radio Network)

=== National radio ===
- Triple J
- ABC Radio National
- ABC Classic
- 2KY National Racing Service
- ABC New England North West

=== Television stations ===
- Seven (formerly branded as Prime7), 7two, 7mate, 7flix, 7Bravo – Seven Network owned and operated station channels.
- Nine (NBN), 9Go!, 9Gem, 9Life – Nine Network affiliated channels, owned by WIN Corporation.
- 10, 10 Drama, 10 Comedy and Nickelodeon – Network 10 owned and operated station channels.
- ABC, ABC Family, ABC Kids, ABC Entertains and ABC News, part of the Australian Broadcasting Corporation.
- Special Broadcasting Service, SBS, SBS2, SBS Food, SBS WorldWatch, SBS World Movies and NITV.

Subscription Television services are provided by Foxtel.

== Attractions ==
- Armidale and Region Aboriginal Cultural Centre and Keeping Place
- Oxley Wild Rivers National Park, which includes Dangar Falls and Gorge and Gara Gorge
- Saumarez Homestead
- New England Regional Art Museum
- Cathedral Rock National Park
- Waterfall Way and Wollomombi Falls
- Mount Yarrowyck Aboriginal Rock Art site
- Gemstone fossicking
- Ispa Kebab Shop at Central

== Heritage listings ==
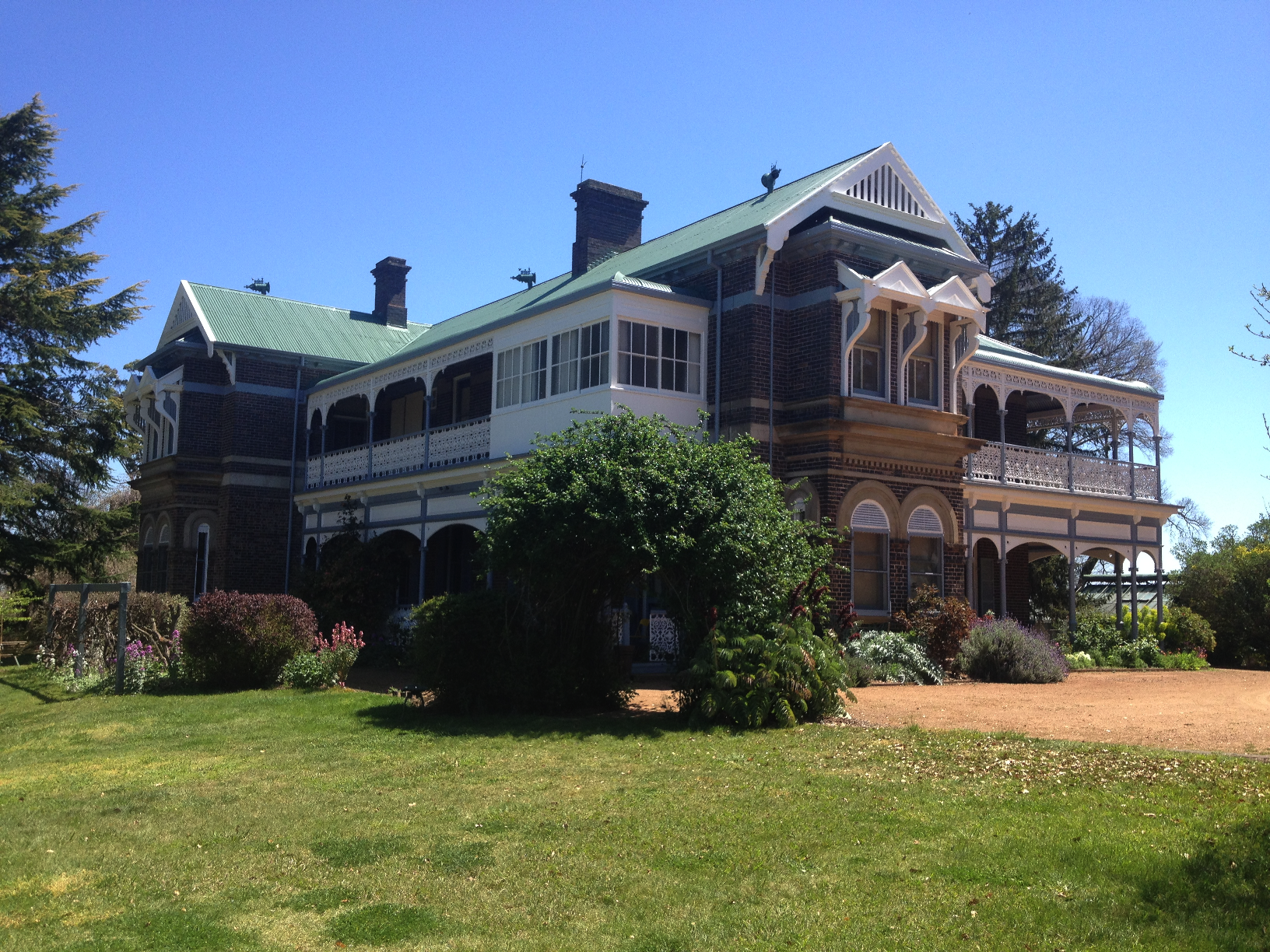
Saumarez Homestead

Armidale has a number of heritage-listed sites, including:

- 158 Beardy Street: Armidale Post Office
- 164 Beardy Street: Commercial Bank of Australia Building
- 216 Brown Street: Armidale railway station turntable
- 234 Brown Street: Armidale railway station
- 125 Dangar Street: Central Park, Armidale
- 132 Dangar Street: Saints Mary and Joseph Catholic Cathedral
- 108 Faulkner Street: Lands Board Office
- 60 Madgwick Drive: Booloominbah
- 122–132 Mossman Street: Old Teachers' College
- 36 Roseneath Lane: Roseneath
- 122 Rusden Street: St Peter's Cathedral
- 230 Saumarez Road: Saumarez Homestead
- Allingham Street: Hunter River Lancers Training Depot

== Notable people ==
The following notable people were either born in, currently live in or previously resided in Armidale

- Peter Allen, singer and stage performer
- Jillian Banfield, Geomicrobiologist
- Archie Barwick, farmer and WWI sergeant
- Jack Bedson, children's author and poet
- Kate Bell, actress
- Anya Beyersdorf, actress
- Leigh Blackmore, writer and editor
- Florence Turner Blake (1873–1959), artist and benefactor
- Michele Bullock, economist
- Zihni Buzo, engineer
- Alex Buzo, playwright
- Zelman Cowen, 19th Governor General of Australia, in office from 1977 to 1982, vice-chancellor of the University of New England (1966–1970)
- James Robert Davis (Big Dick Jimmy), cult leader charged for slavery
- Bruce Devlin, professional golfer, sportscaster and golf course designer
- Edward Doody, Catholic bishop
- Cadel Evans, professional cyclist
- Hugh Gordon, veterinary parasitologist
- Bill Hirschberg (1881–1963), rugby union player
- Fergus James, singer-songwriter
- Anthony Kelly, martial artist
- Mary Kirkpatrick, first trained midwife on the Mid North Coast of New South Wales
- John McIntosh, Australian politician, member of the New South Wales Legislative Council
- John Monckton (1938–2017), Olympic backstroke silver medallist
- Anne Plunkett, Australian Ambassador to Ireland; Portugal
- Gayla Reid, writer
- Steven Conte, writer
- Frank Roberts, boxer
- Joe Roff, rugby union player
- Caroline Ann Rowland (in religion Mother Mary Cadula), founder of St Ursula's College, Armidale
- Elzear Torreggiani, Catholic bishop
- Peter Turnbull, WW2 fighter ace
- Margaret Vyner, model and actress
- Don Walker, keyboardist for Cold Chisel
- George Warnecke (1894–1981), journalist, publisher, and founding editor of The Australian Women's Weekly
- Dean Widders, rugby league player
- Sir Thomas George Wilson (1876–1958), obstetrician and gynaecologist
- Judith Wright, poet

== Sister cities ==
- Masterton, New Zealand
- Kanuma, Japan
