= Duval High School =

Location
- Armidale, New South Wales; Australia; 30°29′40″S 151°39′52″E

Information
- Type: Government-funded co-educational bi-modal partially academically selective and comprehensive secondary day school
- Motto: Learning to Live
- Established: 1974; 52 years ago
- School district: Armidale
- Educational authority: New South Wales Department of Education
- Principal: Stafford Cameron
- Staff: 68
- Teaching staff: 48.3 FTE (2018)
- Years: Year 7 to Year 12
- Enrolment: 602 (2018)
- Colours: Bottle green and white

Duval High School was a government-funded co-educational bi-modal partially academically selective and comprehensive secondary day school, located in Armidale, New South Wales, Australia.

Founded in 1974, the school enrolled approximately 600 students in 2018, from Year 7 to Year 12, of whom 17 percent identified as Indigenous Australians and 15 percent were from a language background other than English. The school was operated by the NSW Department of Education; and the school's motto was Learning to Live.

In 2018 it was announced that Duval High would merge with Armidale High School to form the newly established Armidale Secondary College that will cater for approximately 1,500 students from Year 7 to Year 12. The installation of a temporary additional school at Duval High School started, in readiness for students during the transition period from January 2019. Construction of Armidale Secondary College commenced in 2019 and continue in 2020. Armidale Secondary College commenced in the new buildings in Term 1, 2021.

== History ==
The school sits at the foot of Duval Mountain, which was named after stockman John Duval, a farmer from Staffordshire, England who, following the break and enter of a property, was sentenced to death in 1825. Duval was transported to New South Wales and worked for Captain William Dumaresq guiding squatters to the north.

== The arts ==
Duval High School is also recognised for the talent of students in the field of arts, particularly drama and public speaking.

== See also ==
- List of government schools in New South Wales
- List of selective high schools in New South Wales
- Education in Australia
