= Johnson's Building, Warwick =

Johnson's Building
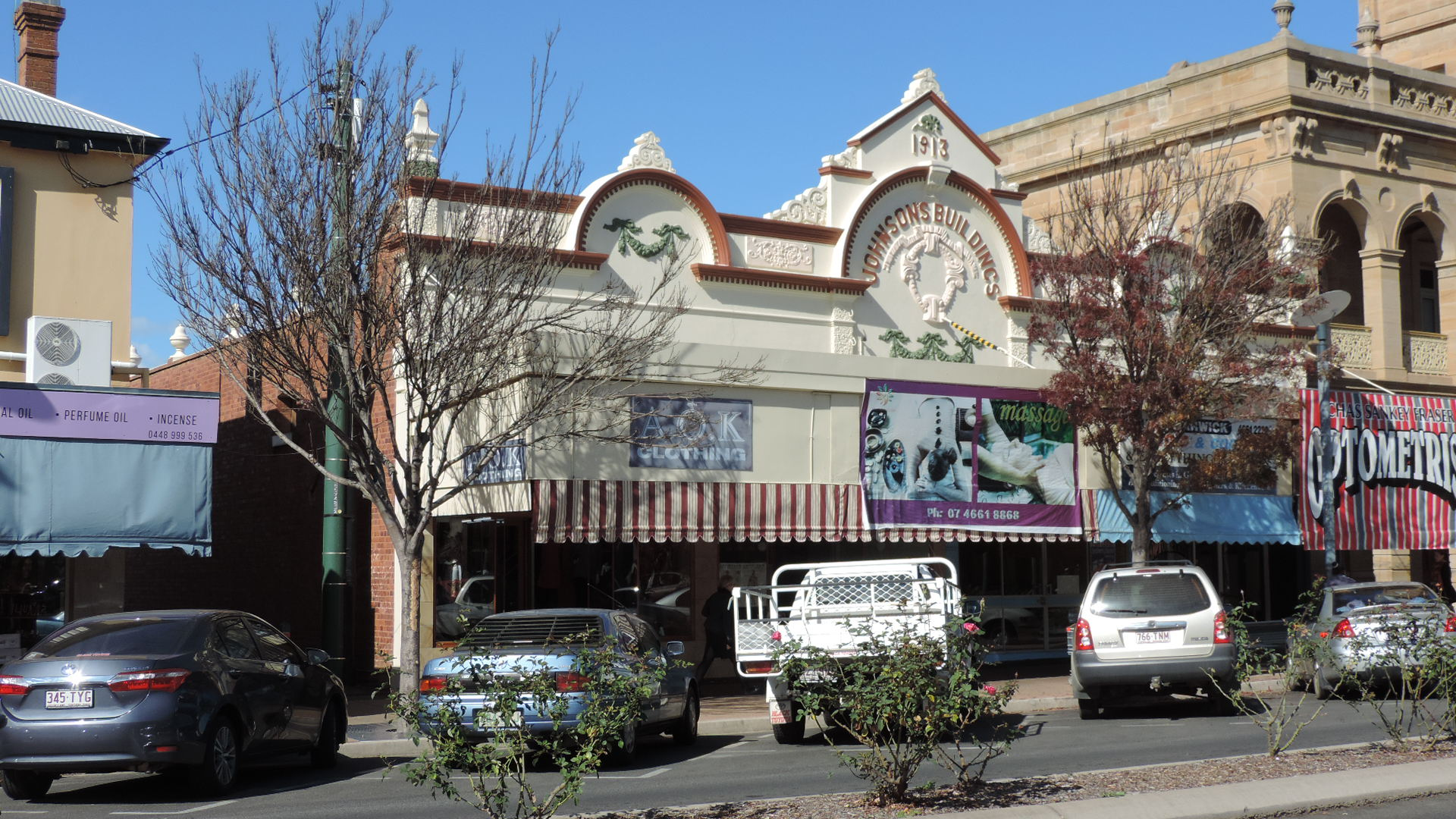
- Johnson's Building, 2015

- Location within Queensland Location within Australia
- 28.2149°S 152.0331°E
- Location: 64–70 Palmerin Street, Warwick, Southern Downs Region, Queensland, Australia

History
- Design period: 1870s–1890s (late 19th century)
- Built: 1898–1913

Site notes
- Architect(s): Conrad Cobden Dornbusch, Hall & Dods

Queensland Heritage Register
- Official name: Johnson's Building
- Type: state heritage (built)
- Designated: 11 June 1993
- Reference no.: 600960
- Significant period: 1890s, 1910s (fabric); 1898–ongoing (historical commercial use); 1900–1930 (bank use)
- Significant components: out building/s
- Builders: Daniel Connolly

Johnson's Building is a heritage-listed set of shops at 64–70 Palmerin Street, Warwick, Southern Downs Region, Queensland, Australia. It was designed by Conrad Cobden Dornbusch and built in 1898 by Daniel Connolly. It was altered to a design by Hall & Dods in 1900 and then extended in 1913 to a design by Hugh Campbell and built by L. A. Tessman. It was added to the Queensland Heritage Register on 11 June 1993.

== History ==
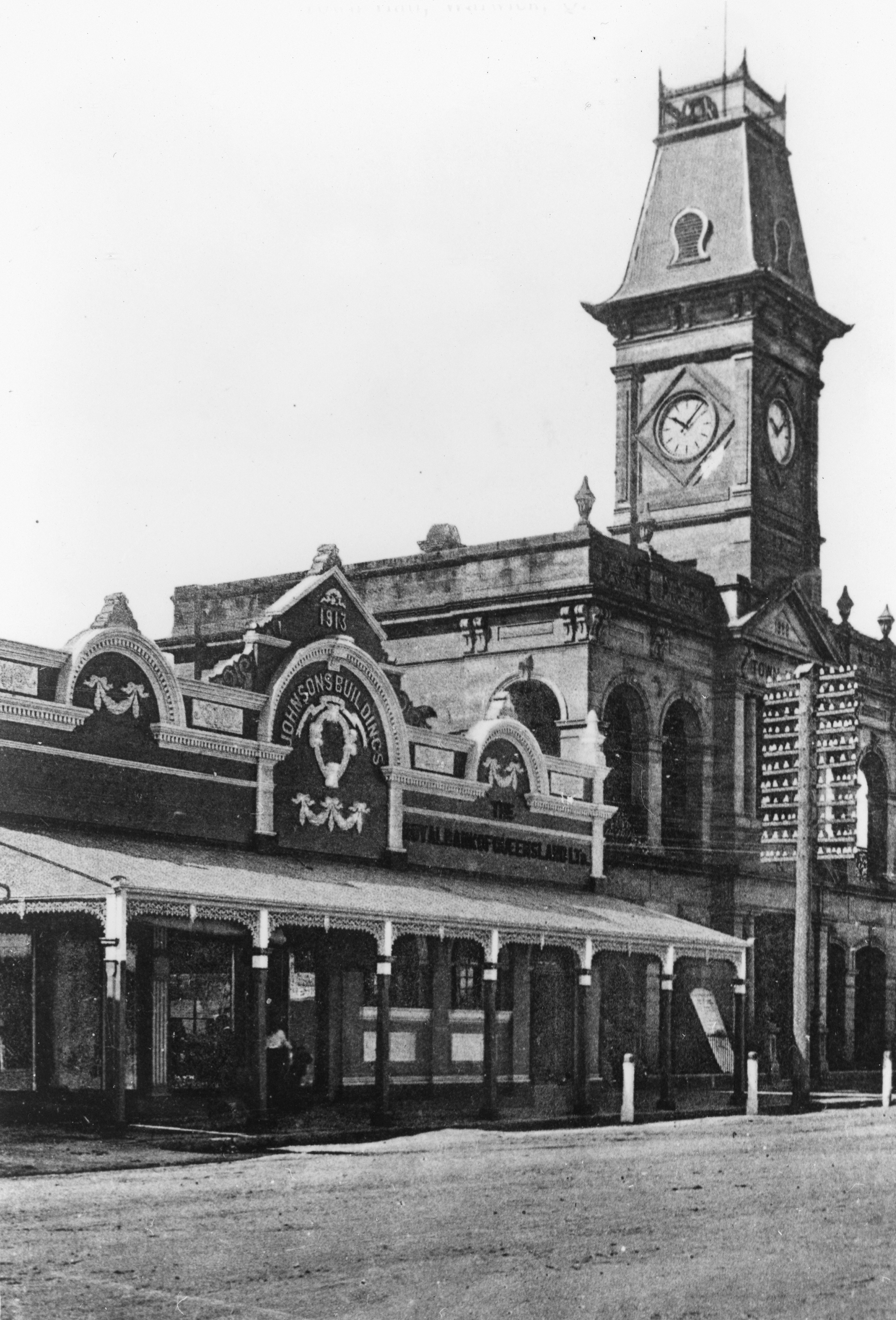
Johnson's Building (left) and Warwick Town Hall (right), 1918

Johnson's Building is a set of four single-storey masonry shops linked by a common facade, adjacent to the Warwick Town Hall in Palmerin Street.

The land was acquired by Frederick Hudson in 1857 who held the land for a number of years before it was sold to Thomas Alexander Johnson in 1896. Johnson was an Alderman on the Warwick Municipal Council from 1879 to 1898, and was Mayor of Warwick from 1881 to 1884. Johnson was subsequently a Member of the Queensland Legislative Council from 1904 until his death in 1914. Johnson also held various positions such as President of the Warwick Progress Association, Vice-president of the Eastern Downs Agricultural and Pastoral Association and Chairman of the Warwick Farmers' Milling Co.

The two shops adjacent to the Town Hall were built in 1898. They were designed by Conrad Cobden Dornbusch and built by Daniel Connolly.

In 1900 these shops were altered and converted into premises for the Warwick branch of the Royal Bank of Queensland. The alterations were overseen by Dornbusch, acting for Hall & Dods in Brisbane.

In 1913 the premises occupied by the Bank were altered, and two new shops were constructed adjacent to the northern side of the Bank. A new facade was also constructed to link the existing and new buildings. The new shops and alterations were designed by local architect Hugh Campbell and built by L. A. Tessman.

Johnson died in 1914 and the building was divided between three of his children, leaving the two new shops to his daughters Helena Maria Rowell (64 Palmerin St) and Elizabeth Ellen Hardaker (66 Palmerin St). The premises leased to the bank were left to one of his sons, Thomas James Johnson (68–70 Palmerin St).

64 Palmerin Street was rented by Mrs Gertrude Florence Jensen from 1932 until 1948 at which time she purchased the shop. Mrs Jensen ran a ladies fashion shop known as "Jennette Salon". The shop was acquired by her son, Mervyn W. Jensen in 1989, and continues to operate as a ladies fashion shop.

Elizabeth Hardaker owned 66 Palmerin Street until her death in 1923 when it passed into the hands of trustees. The property was purchased in 1949 by Mrs Jensen's son and daughter, Mervyn W. Jensen and Dulcie D. Jensen, and continues to trade under the name of Jensens Men and Boys wear.

The Royal Bank of Queensland, subsequently the National Bank of Australia, continued to occupy part of Johnson's Buildings until 1930 (68–70 Palmerin St), after which the premises were leased to a succession of tenants who operated a cafe. The property was acquired by Peter Stephanos, one of the lessees in 1943. In recent years, the premises have been divided into two shops, currently the Warwick Newsagency (68 Palmerin Street), and the Fair Lady Hair/Beauty Salon (70 Palmerin Street).

== Description ==
Johnson's Buildings comprise four single-storeyed shops linked by a rendered masonry facade. The shops have brick party walls, individual pitched corrugated iron roofs, timber framed additions at the rear, and out-buildings.

The facade above the awning line has a cornice with dentils which forms a large central arch flanked by two smaller ones. These arches are topped with scrolls and a central stepped pediment. The parapet is decorated with acroteria and plaster reliefs of drapes and scrolls; the central arched panel bears the name "Johnson's Buildings", with "1913" set in the pediment above.

The cantilevered awning replaced an earlier one which was supported by posts. Internally, the shops retain some of their original fabric, including pressed metal ceilings in the two 1913 shops to the north. These ceilings have floral motifs set in a grid pattern to a large central panel, with a finer floral motif pattern to the edge and cornice.

The elaborately decorated facade of the Johnson's Buildings makes a distinctive contribution to the streetscape of Warwick's main street, which includes some particularly fine and intact nineteenth and early twentieth century buildings.

== Heritage listing ==
Johnson's Building was listed on the Queensland Heritage Register on 11 June 1993 having satisfied the following criteria.

The place is important in demonstrating the evolution or pattern of Queensland's history.

The buildings are important in demonstrating the pattern of Queensland's history, in particular the development of the commercial centre of Warwick.

The place is important in demonstrating the principal characteristics of a particular class of cultural places.

Further, they are important in demonstrating the principal characteristics of a group of early twentieth-century shops.

The place is important because of its aesthetic significance.

The richly decorated facade makes a distinctive contribution to the main street of Warwick which is valued by the community.

The place has a special association with the life or work of a particular person, group or organisation of importance in Queensland's history.

The Johnson's Buildings have special association with the life of Warwick businessman and politician, the Hon TA Johnson and his family.
