= Thomas George Wilson =

Australian obstetrician and gynaecologist

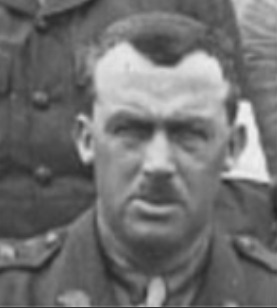
- Born: March 27, 1876; Armidale, New South Wales
- Died: March 15, 1958 (aged 81); Adelaide
- Education: University of Sydney
- Occupations: Obstetrician and gynaecologist
- Years active: 1901–47
- Employer(s): Royal Adelaide Hospital, University of Adelaide
- Organization: Royal Australasian College of Surgeons
- Spouse: Elsa May Couzens
- Children: Charles Graham Wilson, David George Wilson
- Parent(s): Charles Wilson MP, Annie McBride

Sir Thomas George Wilson (March 27, 1876 – March 15, 1958) was an Australian obstetrician and gynaecologist. He was a founding fellow of Royal Australasian College of Surgeons, the Royal College of Obstetricians and Gynaecologists and State Nurses Registration Board of South Australia.

== Early life ==
Generally knows as George, Wilson was born in Armidale in 1876, the fourth child of Charles Wilson, an Irish-Australian politician, and his wife Annie (née McBride) who was also Irish born. Wilson was educated at New England Grammar School and The University of Sydney, graduating from his undergraduate studies in 1899 and his medical degree in 1904, though qualifying as a fellow of the Royal College of Surgeons, Edinburgh, in 1901. He also undertook postgraduate work in Vienna, London and Dublin.

== Career ==
After completing his studies, Wilson returned to Australia, settling in Adelaide. He co-founded the Australasian Trained Nurses' Association's South Australia branch organisation with hospital owner Kate Hill and Dr A. A. Lendon in 1905. He established an innovative ante-natal clinic at the Royal Adelaide Hospital in 1910, believing that routine examination during pregnancy would reduce labour complications. He operated as the sole doctor of the clinic until 1914.

At the outbreak of World War I in 1914, Wilson was commissioned as a Major in the Australian Army Medical Corps, part of the Australian Imperial Force. He served in Lemnos and Egypt in an army hospital in 1915, before being briefly sent back to Australia in 1916 because of illness. In May 1916, he was re-appointed to the Australian Imperial Force as lieutenant colonel, commanding troops on the hospital ship Karoola. From September 1918, Wilson worked at the Australian army hospitals in France and England. His military service ended in August 1919, in Adelaide.

Resuming practice in Adelaide in 1919, Wilson revived the ante-natal clinic he had founded, which had been dormant in his absence during the war. The clinic transferred to Queen's Home in 1923 and was named in his honour in 1932. Wilson traveled overseas in 1935, researching ways to reduce maternal mortality. On his return, he lobbied for better medical training for improving medical training for doctors and nurses to improve maternal mortality.

Wilson became a lecturer in gynecology at the University of Adelaide in 1920, though he never held a full-time academic position and received no payment for his work in hospitals, the majority of his income being earned from his private practice. In 1922, Wilson was elected president of the South Australian branch of the British Medical Association. In 1924, he was elected a fellow of the American College of Surgeons, in 1927, he was a founding fellow of the Royal Australasian College of Surgeons. He was also a founding fellow of the Royal College of Obstetricians and Gynaecologists, London in 1929.

Wilson endowed a traveling scholarship in obstetrics at the University of Adelaide in 1938.

Wilson was created a Knight Bachelor in 1950 for his services to the field of obstetrics.

== Personal life ==
Wilson married Elsa May Couzens (1884–1960), a nurse, in 1923 at the Holy Trinity Church of England in Adelaide. They had two sons, David George Wilson, who became a diplomat and was the Australian ambassador to Spain, and Charles Graham Wilson (1924–2005, who was also a surgeon.

He was president of the Royal Adelaide Golf Club from 1941 to 1950, had represented New South Wales in tennis while at university and represented the University of Sydney in rowing.
