= Old Newcastle East Public School =

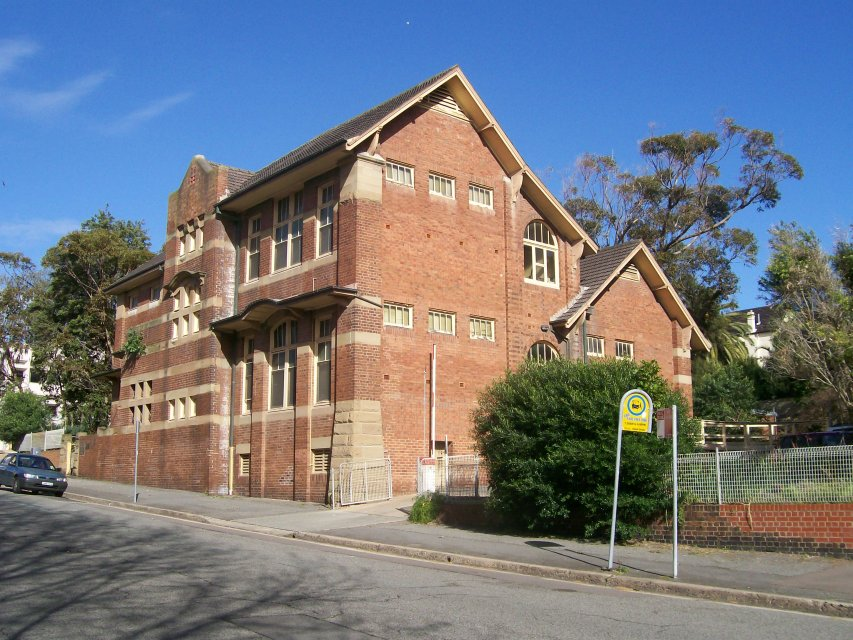
- Newcastle East Public School

- Location within New South Wales Location within Australia
- 32.9295°S 151.7822°E
- Location: 58 Bolton Street, Newcastle, City of Newcastle, New South Wales, Australia

History
- Built: 1908–1912

Site notes
- Architect: WL Vernon
- Owner: Attorney General's Department

New South Wales Heritage Register
- Official name: Newcastle Annexe; Newcastle East Public School; Newcastle Public School
- Type: state heritage (built)
- Designated: 2 April 1999
- Reference no.: 795
- Type: Courthouse
- Category: Law Enforcement

Old Newcastle East Public School is a heritage-listed former school building at 58 Bolton Street, Newcastle, City of Newcastle, New South Wales, Australia. It was designed by Walter Liberty Vernon and built from 1908 to 1912. It is also known as Newcastle Public School. It was added to the New South Wales State Heritage Register on 2 April 1999.

== History ==
The building housed the Newcastle East Public School until it moved to the former Newcastle Junior High School site in 1982. It was then used as an annexe to the Newcastle Court House across the street, serving as the Community Justice Centre.

It was sold by the Department of Attorney-General and Justice in March 2014, having become surplus to their needs due to the court house's move to a new building. It was subsequently developed as the Parque Newcastle East apartments, with the heritage-listed buildings adaptively reused and multi-storey apartments built on the unused parts of the site.

== Description ==
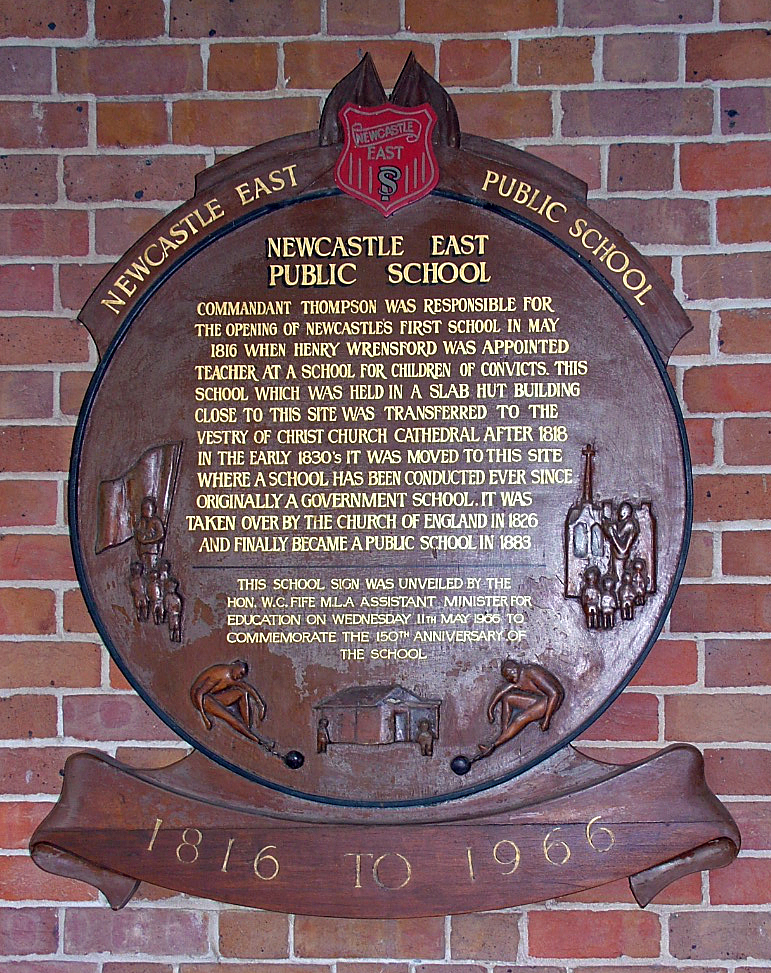
Plaque with the history of the school, 2007

The Old Newcastle East Public School is designed in Vernon's typical federation Free Classical adopted school style. The building was designed as a substantial school classroom block with a hipped roof dominated by several tall chimneys. The bolton Street entrance is marked by a small gable roofed projecting entrance bay which features a stone capped parapet.

The building is constructed in face brick and features contrasting sandstone trim, abutments and string coursing. Original slate roofing material was replaced with tiles c. 1970.

== Heritage listing ==
The Old Newcastle East Public School is of considerable historical, social and townscape significance being reputably the oldest school building in Australia. The substantial Federation Free style designed building is a good example of Vernon's work. It is prominently located on a corner site within the centre of Newcastle.

The Old Newcastle East Public School was listed on the New South Wales State Heritage Register on 2 April 1999.
