= Broken Hill Post Office =

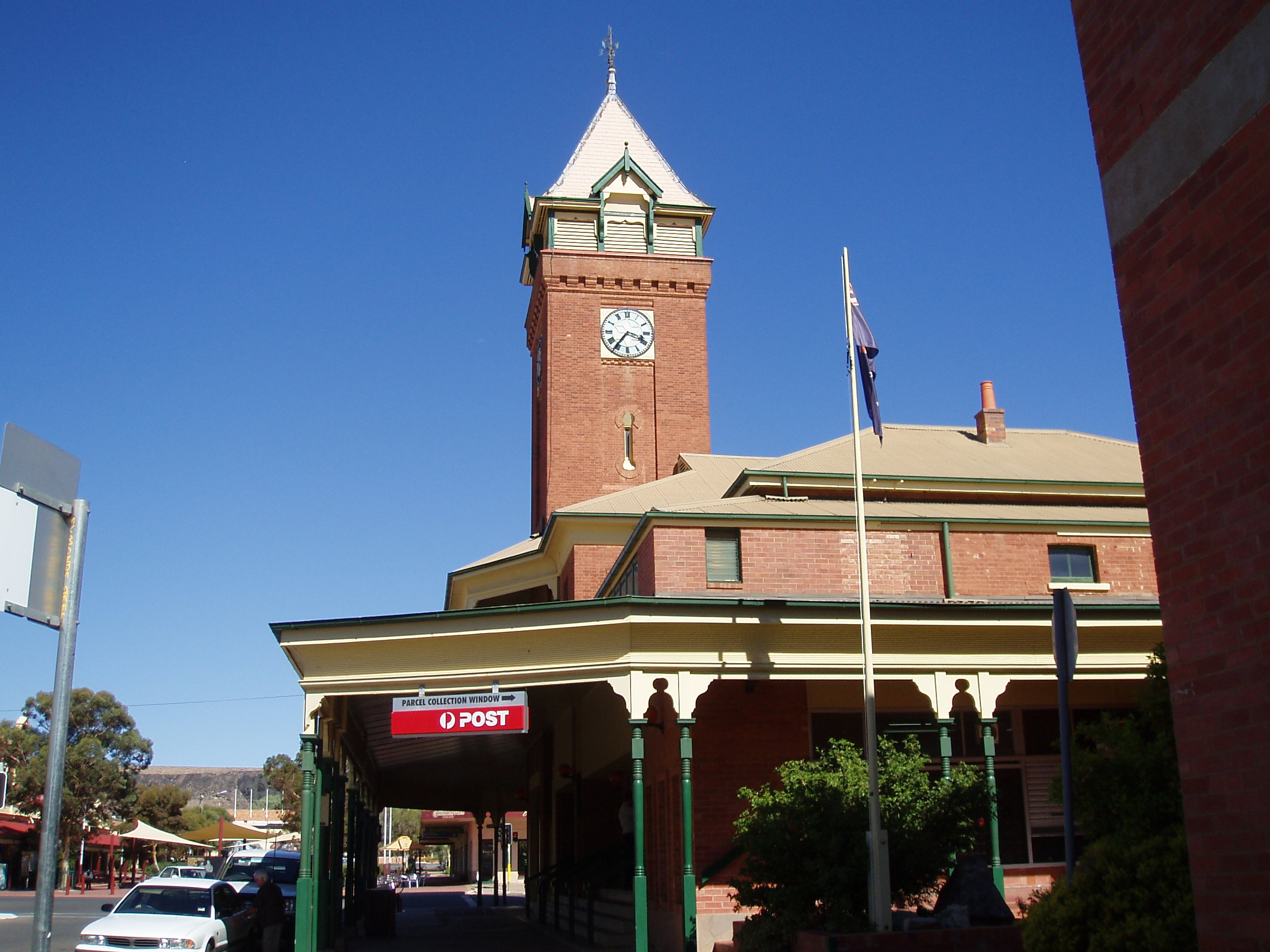

- Location within New South Wales Location within Australia
- 31.9581°S 141.4653°E
- Location: 258–260 Argent Street, Broken Hill, City of Broken Hill, New South Wales, Australia

History
- Built: 1890–1892

Site notes
- Architect: James Barnet 1900; additions/alterations by Walter Liberty Vernon.
- Owner: Australia Post

New South Wales Heritage Register
- Official name: Broken Hill Post Office
- Type: state heritage (built)
- Designated: 22 December 2000
- Reference no.: 1423
- Type: Post Office
- Category: Postal and Telecommunications
- Builders: Mr John Dobbie

Commonwealth Heritage List
- Official name: Broken Hill Post Office
- Type: Listed place (Historic)
- Designated: 08 November 2011
- Reference no.: 105499

Broken Hill Post Office is a heritage-listed post office at 258–260 Argent Street, Broken Hill, in the Far West of New South Wales, Australia. The original building was designed by James Barnet, and was built from 1890 to 1892 by John Dobbie. Walter Liberty Vernon designed a telegraph office addition in 1900. The property is owned by Australia Post. It was added to the New South Wales State Heritage Register on 22 December 2000. It was added to the Australian Commonwealth Heritage List on 8 November 2011.

== History ==
=== Background ===
The first official postal service in Australia was established in April 1809, when the Sydney merchant Isaac Nichols was appointed as the first Postmaster in the colony of NSW. Prior to this mail had been distributed directly by the captain of the ship on which the mail arrived, however this system was neither reliable nor secure.

In 1825 the colonial administration was empowered to establish a Postmaster General's Department, which had previously been administered from Britain.

In 1828 the first post offices outside Sydney were established, with offices in Bathurst, Campbelltown, Parramatta, Liverpool, Newcastle, Penrith and Windsor. By 1839 there were forty post offices in the colony, with more opening as settlement spread. The advance of postal services was further increased as the railway network began to be established throughout NSW from the 1860s. Also, in 1863, the Postmaster General W. H. Christie noted that accommodation facilities for Postmasters in some post offices was quite limited, and stated that it was a matter of importance that "post masters should reside and sleep under the same roof as the office".

The appointment of James Barnet as Acting Colonial Architect in 1862 coincided with a considerable increase in funding to the public works program. Between 1865 and 1890 the Colonial Architect's Office was responsible for the building and maintenance of 169 Post Offices and telegraph offices in NSW. The post offices constructed during this period were designed in a variety of architectural styles, as Barnet argued that the local parliamentary representatives always preferred "different patterns".

The construction of new post offices continued throughout the 1890s Depression years under the leadership of Walter Liberty Vernon, who retained office from 1890 to 1911. While twenty-seven post offices were built between 1892 and 1895, funding to the Government Architect's Office was cut from 1893 to 1895, causing Vernon to postpone a number of projects.

Following Federation in 1901, the Commonwealth Government took over responsibility for Post, Telegraph and Telephone offices, with the Department of Home Affairs Works Division being made responsible for Post Office construction. In 1916 construction was transferred to the Department of Works and Railways, with the Department of the Interior responsible during World War II.

On 22 December 1975 the Postmaster General's Department was abolished and replaced by the Postal and Telecommunications Department, with Telecom and Australia Post being created. In 1989, the Australian Postal Corporation Act established Australia Post as a self-funding entity, which heralded a new direction in property management, including a move towards smaller shop-front style post offices away from the larger more traditional buildings.

For much of its history, the post office has been responsible for a wide variety of community services including mail distribution, as agencies for the Commonwealth Savings Bank, electoral enrolments, and the provision of telegraph and telephone services. The town post office served as a focal point for the community, most often built in a prominent position in the centre of town close to other public buildings, creating a nucleus of civic buildings and community pride.

=== Broken Hill Post Office ===
In September 1883, Charles Rasp, a boundary rider on the Mount Gipps sheep station, pegged out a mineral lease on the property, in the belief that a rock outcrop within the lease area bore tin oxide. Rasp was joined by two other property workers, who in turn advised the manager of Mount Gipps, George McCulloch. McCulloch suggested a "syndicate of seven" investors to pay for the development of the lease. Early samples proved to have a low bearing of tin and the main settlement was at Silverton to the north.

It was not until January 1885, when silver ore was discovered in the tailings of the Rasp shaft that people began to take an interest in the Broken Hill area. In June, the "syndicate" decided to register itself as the Broken Hill Proprietary Company Limited, to mine the ore load. With the establishment of the mine, the town began to grow rapidly with a Broken Hill Progress Committee being established in November to encourage the town's development. The first storekeeper, Walter Sully, operated a postal service pending the construction of a post office.

In January 1886 the first post office was opened in Broken Hill following pressure from the Progress Committee on the postmaster at Silverton, the nearest post office. The Broken Hill office was run by Marie Wilson from a small building attached to Walter Sully's general store in Argent Street. Wilson was the first Government Official appointed in Broken Hill.

In August 1886 a telegraph station was established in Broken Hill, also operating out of the post office building, with William Newtown appointed as Post and Telegraph Master. By the end of 1886, Broken Hill's population had risen to 3,000, and the post office building was deemed no longer adequate for the bustling mining town. From October 1886, the Progress Committee began to make official requests to the Post Master General's (PMG) Department for the erection of an official post office. Initially, the PMG Department was reluctant to approve the erection of a large office due to the uncertainty of Broken Hill settlement being permanent. Many other frontier mining towns had disappeared when the ore had dried up. However, by October 1888, the Department had accepted Broken Hill's permanency and plans had been drawn up by the Colonial Architects Office under James Barnet, for a large office, with a residence attached. These were rejected on the grounds of being too small and it was not until 11 November 1889 that the final plans were accepted.

The tender for the construction was awarded to John Dobbie of Balmain for £6,475 on the condition that the new office be erected in twelve months.

The new office was finished in 1892, opening for business on 9 May. The most striking feature of the new office was the tower, standing 86 feet high. A balcony adorned the tower and second storey of the office, with a verandah encircling the ground level. The internal fittings, including entrance door in Argent Street, mail counters and stairways were made out of cedar. The postmaster was accommodated within the building, with a residence for a postal assistant also provided. See Image 10 for the layout of the double residence.

In 1973 the rear section of the Post Office was removed to make way for the building of a new telephone exchange. The postmaster's residence was also removed at this stage. Between August and November 1979 a major refurbishment and renovation program was undertaken in the post office, during which time the service operated out of temporary accommodation.

== Description ==
Broken Hill Post Office is a two-storey, Flemish bond, red-brick corner building in the Federation Free Style with Arts and Crafts influence. It has a complex, corrugated steel roof, comprising hipped and gable-hipped forms, with a small dormer to the northwestern side of the original two-storey roof. There is an 86 ft high, square, heavy corner clock and bell tower that dominates the building and the streetscape. It has a light-coloured slate pyramidal roof with lead flashing, decorative metal finials at the apex and four clock faces. Timber gablets are centred over each face with louvred vents to the bell room and a dentilled, corbelled brick course between.

To the southwest is an English bond, gable hipped single storey addition, c. 1912, a two-storey addition fronting Chloride Street, and to the rear, much later stretcher bond additions c. 1960s. Two chimneys punctuate the roofline; one rendered and painted corbelled chimney to the east and a single face brick chimney with a terracotta pot to the west.

A wide, high verandah wraps around three facades at ground level, surmounted by a first-floor faceted balcony wrapping around the tower. The verandah and balcony have board and batten soffits and are supported by paired, turned-timber posts painted green, with cream painted, shaped timber brackets topped by a plain, cream entablature, which also continues below the eaves of the first floor. The balcony has a non-original, intrusive asbestos sheet and batten balustrade, and flooring comprises exposed timber joists and temporary covering.

There is a smaller, hipped verandah attached to the rear of the building, sheltering the loading dock and access to the stairwell, at the northern end of the verandah.

The red-brick facade is both concave-tooled and tuck-pointed, and retains rounded arches over the front-arched windows. There is a cream-painted, rendered skirting around the perimeter of the building and painted detailing to the single storey addition fronting Argent Street. The painted detailing comprises pilasters between windows, sills and lintels, corbelled string course below the parapet, entablature, balustraded parapet and coping. All window joinery is painted dark green. The upper-floor openings retain shallow-brick header arches and cream-painted sills. There are red pavers to the verandah footpath, modern square tiles to the main entries and concrete paving to the rear yard, with a bitumen surface to the laneway to the southwest.

First-floor fenestration appears to be original to the street facades, retaining uniformly distributed, two pane upper and lower sash timber-framed windows and French doors to the balcony. There are small vertical slit windows with round brick ends below each clock face of the tower. The ground floor retains shallow brick arches to the southwestern additions and early windows with six-coloured pane upper and two clear-pane lower sashes to the front facade of this addition. The original corner building ground-floor windows have recent glazing in timber frames, and the ground floor has later doors, sidelights and later banks of post boxes to the northern facade.

The ground floor interior of Broken Hill Post Office is divided into four main areas, comprising a carpeted retail area to the eastern corner, carpeted timber and glass partitioned offices adjacent at centre, sheet vinyl floored mail sorting and storage and staff amenities.

Ceilings to the ground floor vary in height and material, including early decorative plaster and batten ceiling with a moulded cornice to the mail sorting areas, and some boarded timber with a moulded cornice south of the centre strong room. There is board and batten ceiling to the office areas, plasterboard to the later additions to the rear spaces and acoustic tiling of a false ceiling to the southern mail rooms. There are many exposed beams throughout this level, largely due to the extensive changes to the original fabric and removal of material. Air-conditioning ducting is also exposed and is intrusive. The ground floor has predominantly attached and suspended fluorescent lighting. The retail space has some pendant light fittings, and some spaces have had ceiling fans installed.

The standard Australia Post grey colour scheme c. 1990s dominates the entire interior of the Post Office, and the ground floor retains some original architraves and some sections of original skirting in the mail sorting areas. The walls are largely rendered and painted, with some asbestos or fibre cement sheeting and glass partitioning. The ground floor interior has been altered dramatically from its original form, and no evidence of items such as fireplaces has been preserved.

The stairwell servicing the first floor is located to the rear of the building off the rear verandah. The stair has red-sheet vinyl flooring, grey-painted brackets, turned-timber posts and balusters. It divides at the first landing, separate stairs leading up to the female bathroom on the return to the south, and up to the main body of the first floor to the east.

The first floor has not been altered as dramatically as the ground floor, however several changes appear to have occurred. The layout is divided in plan into quarters. These quarters comprise vinyl-floored male and female bathrooms to the west, vinyl-floored recreation room, observation gallery and infilled-verandah to the north, carpeted tenanted office space to the east and staff lunch room and storerooms to the south. Access to the tower is via two separate ladders from a store room in the southern quarter and up again within the roof space and tower body.

Ceilings to the first floor are painted, wide, beaded boards, with a raked section to the western corner bathrooms where it appears a verandah has been infilled, and there is a narrow coved cornice. The only exception is in the commercial office of the eastern quarter, which has a false ceiling with air-conditioning ducting installed. Original skirting is retained, along with original internal four-panel doors with operable fanlights over, and architraves. The exception is in the eastern corner office, which has some modern flush internal doors. Architraves are retained to windows, excepting those of the verandah infill, having later windows. Original wall vents are retained to some external walls, which have been rendered and painted.

There is an intrusive modern kitchenette fitout, which is in very poor condition, to the southern corner lunch room, and the bathrooms have modern fitouts. Lighting to this level incorporates attached and suspended fluorescent tubing. All fireplaces to the first floor have been bricked in, excepting the lunch room fireplace which is retained in fair condition with its marble surround, cast iron grate and built in cupboards either side.

At the centre of the mail sorting and storage area is a strong room stepped down from ground floor level. An unusual feature of this element is the square, mirrored observation window built into the walls above, linking to an observation room situated over. Another retained feature is the series of telegram chute pipes which can be seen in the eastern corner office.

Signage to Broken Hill Post Office comprises suspended modern Australia Post signs at either end of the ground-floor verandah, and there is a coloured coat of arms located on the Argent Street facade above the ground floor awning and next to the first-floor balcony. Broken Hill Post Office does not have its name located prominently on the building.

The Post Office is a landmark feature in its surrounding landscape, contributing greatly to the civic centre of central Broken Hill and its historic Argent Street setting as the key building that visually defines the centre of the city. It is complemented by surrounding civic buildings such as the elaborate Court House in the Victorian Second Empire style and the Arts and Crafts style Technical College. The intrusive Telstra building to the northwest, fronting Chloride Street and telecommunications tower to the rear, detract from the appearance of the Post Office.

Vegetation within the site is limited to a young tree located within the footpath to the eastern facade and landscaped beds either side of the driveway on Chloride Street. Adjacent to the west is a large bitumen carpark behind the Court House, and the rear yard is concreted. There is an early brick outbuilding to the western corner of the site, possibly a former stables, that has been converted to a cycle shed and garage for postal vehicles.

As at 5 July 2000, Broken Hill Post Office was reported to be generally in very good condition, excepting a few minor interior elements, even retaining the original clock and bell mechanisms in situ, now fitted with an electric motor. The archaeological potential of the site is considered high, with the open rear yard concreted over and the potential for remnants of early structures within the site boundaries and nearby. While there have been a series of additions and alterations to Broken Hill Post Office, and the original form of the building is still apparent in remnant fabric, the remaining original interior fabric has been altered substantially. The exterior is in very good condition and intact. The post office retains the features which make it culturally significant, including architectural details such as the imposing square corner clock tower, verandahs and decorative mansard roof, and its overall form, scale and style.

=== Modifications and dates ===
- 1890–92: Original construction of the one and two-storey corner building during 1890–92, comprising five arched openings in width (the existing first five openings, including porch from the corner) at ground floor to Argent Street and two and a half times this distance in depth along Chloride Street. The original construction incorporated a double, two-storey residence to the northwest.
- 1900: Construction of the Vernon-designed, gable-ended Telegraph Office to front Argent street occurred c. 1900. This addition included an exchange, fitter's room, operating room, public area and postal manager's room, with a verandah to the side and rear. Steps led up to the northern side lobby doors, now infilled as the southernmost arched window.
- 1902: The clocks were installed into the tower in 1902.
- 1912: It is estimated that the balustraded parapet addition and alterations of the 1900 telegraph office occurred c. 1912.
- date unknown: The residence appears to have been altered, date unknown, but some time after 1912, with the removal of the side entry (probably to the residence) to Chloride Street and the removal of the original ground-floor service wing to the northwest, shown in historic plans Image 13.
- date unknown: Internal rearrangement led to the changing location of the entries into the building, causing the opening up of the current ground-floor corner porch to each facade, date unknown.
- possibly c. 1950s–60s: The upper-floor verandah has been infilled, with a change in staircase location and bathrooms being installed, possibly c. 1950s–60s. The western stairwell, as located on the 1988 plans was probably removed during this time.
- c. 1970s–80s: Installation of modern post boxes along northern wall and to northern end of west wall c. 1970s–80s.
- 1988: 1988 plans show internal partitioning of the centre offices and other minor changes such as steps being removed and a ramp created to Argent Street.
- c. 1990s: Standard Australia Post retail fitout c. 1990s.

== Heritage listing ==
Broken Hill Post Office is significant at a State level for its historical associations, aesthetic qualities and social meaning. The form and scale of Broken Hill Post Office also reflect the wealth derived from the late nineteenth-century mining boom, and confidence in the permanency of the town by the late 1880s. Broken Hill Post Office also provides evidence of the changing nature of postal and telecommunications practices in NSW, particularly in servicing an isolated regional community. Broken Hill Post Office also provides important information on the changing requirements and standards in working conditions in NSW. Broken Hill Post Office is aesthetically significant because it is a strong example of the Federation Free Classical style with Arts and Crafts influence, and makes an important aesthetic contribution to the civic precinct in Broken Hill. As an early example of this architectural style, Broken Hill Post Office is considered to be rare in NSW. Broken Hill Post Office is also associated with the Colonial Architect's Office under James Barnet and the NSW Government Architect's Office under Walter Liberty Vernon. Broken Hill Post Office is also considered to be significant to the Broken Hill community's sense of place.

Broken Hill Post Office was listed on the New South Wales State Heritage Register on 22 December 2000 having satisfied the following criteria.

The place is important in demonstrating the course, or pattern, of cultural or natural history in New South Wales.

Broken Hill Post Office is historically significant because it has been the centre of communications for the community for over a century. The form and scale of Broken Hill Post Office also reflect the wealth derived from the late nineteenth century mining boom, and confidence in the permanency of the town by the late 1880s.

The provision of a double residence for the postmaster and postal assistant provides an important insight into the changing requirements and standards in working conditions in NSW.

Broken Hill Post Office also provides evidence of the changing nature of postal and telecommunications practices in NSW, particularly in servicing an isolated regional community. Broken Hill Post Office was designed by Colonial Architect James Barnet. The Colonial Architect's Office under Barnet designed and maintained a number of post offices across NSW between 1865 and 1890.

The additions and alterations carried out in 1900 were designed by the NSW Government Architect's Office under WL Vernon.

The place is important in demonstrating aesthetic characteristics and/or a high degree of creative or technical achievement in New South Wales.

Broken Hill Post Office is aesthetically significant because it is a fine example of the Federation Free Classical style. It is also an early building showing Arts and Crafts influence.

Broken Hill Post Office is a key building in an important group including the town hall, court house, police station and technical college. The architectural style and location of the building, along with the monumental square clock tower, also make it a focal point defining the centre of the civic precinct of Broken Hill, endowing it with landmark qualities.

The place has strong or special association with a particular community or cultural group in New South Wales for social, cultural or spiritual reasons.

Broken Hill Post Office is a prominent civic building and a local landmark, and has been the centre of communications for the region for over a century. It also reflects the confidence of the local community in its continued prosperity. As such, it is considered to be highly significant to the Broken Hill community's sense of place.

The place has potential to yield information that will contribute to an understanding of the cultural or natural history of New South Wales.

The site has some potential to contain archaeological information relating to the previous use of the site and the evolution of the building and out-buildings associated with the use by the Post Office

The place possesses uncommon, rare or endangered aspects of the cultural or natural history of New South Wales.

As an early building showing Federation Free Classical style and Arts and Crafts influence, Broken Hill Post Office is considered to be a rare building in the history of NSW. A particularly imposing monumental tower contributes to this building being an exemplar of the style.

The earlier provision of a double residence for the postmaster and postal assistant also appears to be a rare aspect of post offices in NSW.

The place is important in demonstrating the principal characteristics of a class of cultural or natural places/environments in New South Wales.

Broken Hill Post Office is a good example of the Federation Free Classical style of architecture. It is part of the group of nineteenth-century post offices in NSW designed by the Colonial Architect's Office under James Barnet. The 1900 additions and alterations provide good evidence of the portfolio of work were designed by the NSW Government Architect's office under Walter Liberty Vernon.
