= Darlinghurst Fire Station =

Fire station in New South Wales

Coordinates: 33°52′34″S 151°13′18″E

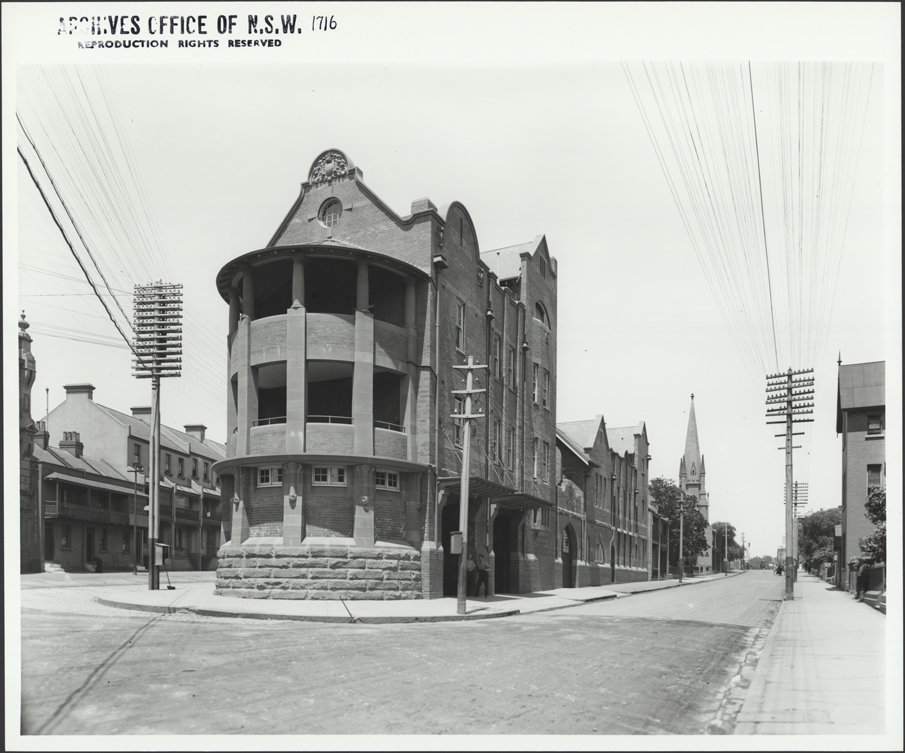
1912 image of the new fire station

Darlinghurst Fire Station is a three-storey brick and stone building situated at the prominent location of the junction of Darlinghurst Road and Victoria Street in Darlinghurst in Sydney, New South Wales, Australia.

It was designed in 1910 by Walter Liberty Vernon it was built in 1911 and opened in 1912.
