= Casino Post Office =

- Location within New South Wales Location within Australia
- 28.8643°S 153.04704°E
- Location: 102 Barker Street, Casino, New South Wales, Australia

History
- Built: 1879–

Site notes
- Architect(s): Extensions by the office of the NSW Government Architect; Walter Liberty Vernon.
- Owner: Australia Post

New South Wales Heritage Register
- Official name: Casino Post Office
- Type: state heritage (built)
- Designated: 23 June 2000
- Reference no.: 1405
- Type: Post Office
- Category: Postal and Telecommunications
- Builders: Builder H Van der Waerden. Extensions by a Mr Stead, porch contractor was WK Mackney.

Casino Post Office is a heritage-listed post office at 102 Barker Street, Casino, in the Northern Rivers region of New South Wales, Australia. It was designed by the NSW Colonial Architect's Office and built from 1879. The property is owned by Australia Post.

== History ==
The first official postal service in Australia was established in April 1809, when the Sydney merchant Isaac Nichols was appointed as the first Postmaster in the colony of NSW. Prior to this mail had been distributed directly by the captain of the ship on which the mail arrived, however this system was neither reliable nor secure.

In 1825 the colonial administration was empowered to establish a Postmaster General's Department, which had previously been administered from Britain.

In 1828 the first post offices outside Sydney were established, with offices in Bathurst, Campbelltown, Parramatta, Liverpool, Newcastle, Penrith and Windsor. By 1839 there were forty post offices in the colony, with more opening as settlement spread. The advance of postal services was further increased as the railway network began to be established throughout NSW from the 1860s. Also, in 1863, the Postmaster General W. H. Christie noted that accommodation facilities for Postmasters in some post offices was quite limited, and stated that it was a matter of importance that "post masters should reside and sleep under the same roof as the office".

The appointment of James Barnet as Acting Colonial Architect in 1862 coincided with a considerable increase in funding to the public works program. Between 1865 and 1890 the Colonial Architects Office was responsible for the building and maintenance of 169 Post Offices and telegraph offices in NSW. The post offices constructed during this period were designed in a variety of architectural styles, as Barnet argued that the local parliamentary representatives always preferred "different patterns".

The construction of new post offices continued throughout the 1890s Depression years under the leadership of Walter Liberty Vernon, who retained office from 1890 to 1911. While twenty-seven post offices were built between 1892 and 1895, funding to the Government Architect's Office was cut from 1893 to 1895, causing Vernon to postpone a number of projects.

Following Federation in 1901, the Commonwealth Government took over responsibility for Post, Telegraph and Telephone Offices, with the Department of Home Affairs Works Division being made responsible for Post Office construction. In 1916 construction was transferred to the Department of Works & Railways, with the Department of the Interior responsible during World War II.

On 22 December 1975 the Postmaster General's Department was abolished and replaced by the Postal & Telecommunications Department, with Australia Post and Telecom formed. In 1989, the Australian Postal Corporation Act established Australia Post as a self-funding entity, which heralded a new direction in property management, including a move towards smaller shop-front style post offices away from the larger more traditional buildings.

For much of its history, the post office has been responsible for a wide variety of community services, including mail distribution, as agencies for the Commonwealth Savings Bank, electoral enrolments, and the provision of telegraph and telephone services. The town post office served as a focal point for the community, most often built in a prominent position in the centre of town close to other public buildings, creating a nucleus of civic buildings and community pride.

=== Casino Post Office ===
The first European settlers in the Casino district were cedar-getters, who had moved into the area in c. 1838, ten years after its exploration in the late 1820s. Pastoralists soon followed, with George Stapleton and Henry Clay claiming land for the first station on what was to become the town of Casino. They named their 30,000 acre station "Cassino", apparently after Mount Cassino in Italy. Part of their property included an easy crossing point on the Richmond River and it was around this that the first small settlement appeared. Originally named The Falls, it was surveyed and renamed Casino in 1855 with land going on sale in 1856. By this time a weekly mail service was already operating from Sydney with the post being collected out of a store in town. The settlement also had a police station, court house, school and race course. By the late 1850s Casino had developed as the centre of settlement in the upper Richmond River district.

The first official postmaster, William Scott, was appointed in the town in c. 1872 with the Post and Telegraph Office operating from the Tomki Shire Offices. In 1879 a new Post Office building was started in Casino, with Postmaster Scott moving into the residence on 21 March 1880. The new office was a single-storey building with an office, four rooms, kitchen and stable.

In 1881 permission was obtained to construct an underground water-storage tank and a boundary fence. The ground in the front of the office was also levelled during this period. In 1883, the Casino office was staffed by Mr Scott as postmaster, his wife as an assistant, a junior telegraph operator, a letter carrier and a messenger. Mail was delivered from Sydney twice a week via coach from Ballina.

In 1889 extensions to the Post Office were approved with the Office being extended to the street frontage and an extra room being added. In 1893, to prevent rain from wetting the private mail boxes and the mailing slot, a portico was added to the front of the building, with a bathroom being added at the same time. In 1894 the first telephone in Casino was installed in the office.

Early in 1915 plans were approved for further alterations. The works included the partial re-erection of the existing building, the addition of an extra floor containing residential quarters, and the rearrangement of the office on the first floor. These were completed by late 1915.

== Description ==
The two-storey, combined Post Office and residence is constructed of double brick with the symmetrical ground-floor front facade rendered as ashlar blockwork. The eastern wall to the ground floor is cream-painted English bond brickwork. The upper floor, a later addition, is constructed of stretcher bond, face sandstock brickwork.

Casino Post Office is an eclectic mix of architectural styles. The main body of the building is in the Victorian Italianate style, with apricot painted ashlar render, arched windows and pilaster details. First completed in 1879, it has c. 1970s extensions to the rear, along the western boundary in stretcher bond, face, reddish-brown brickwork and has a predominantly hipped, corrugated steel roof with a gable at the northern end. There is a later addition along the western wall with the extension of private post office boxes comprising a covered, raised verandah with attached ramp to the footpath, beneath the widened eaves of the c. 1970s extensions to the rear. This extension has a round head picket fence along the boundary and is supported by plain, squared timber posts. Post boxes are located on each wall of the southwest corner, the southern section of wall being set back from the original wall boundary, forming a recessed arcade. Later steps have been installed to each section of boxes.

The ground-floor front facade has a visually heavy, full-length, single-storey classically-arranged portico in the Georgian Revival Style, added between 1889 and 1893. It is supported by paired, rendered and painted Ionic-styled columns, with a squared column at each front corner. They rest on c. 1980s burnt red, clay-tiled, terraced portico floor and steps, and support a plain, banded entablature and balustraded parapet, which conceals a shallow, hipped, corrugated steel roof. The deep portico retains a white-painted timber boarded and shaped batten soffit, with later pendant lighting installed, and a recent steel balustrade to the disabled retail entry terrace leading around from the western ramp.

The ground-floor rear addition of the residence to the eastern side is a combination of face and cream-painted brickwork, with a weatherboard and asbestos cement-sheet laundry and bathroom addition to the northern end. There is a timber porch to the eastern wall, with a corrugated steel roof and timber boarded soffit, supported on squared timber posts and with a cream-painted, timber-slatted balustrade, unpainted timber floorboards and slate on rendered brick steps. This forms the main ground-floor entry to the residence hallway.

The upper-floor residence, added c. 1915, is centered over the ground-floor building and portico and has a balcony to the front facade. The balcony comprises a corrugated steel skillion roof and has the same fabric and detailing as the ground-floor eastern porch, with the addition of a flagpole protruding from the centre of the balcony. The remainder of the upper floor has a gabled hip roof with east and west vent gables. Three face brick chimneys with terracotta pots punctuate the upper-floor roof, and two painted chimneys punctuate the rear additions to the ground-floor section of the residence.

Fenestration is largely symmetrical to the front facade, and the openings of the ground-floor front facade retain original elliptical fanlights with rendered mouldings and keystones. The ground-floor projecting sills are painted a tan colour to match the column capitals and bases, and the window elements are painted dark green. The upper-floor French doors and windows to the front facade are also symmetrical and original, excepting the more recent, outer screen doors. Windows to the east and west facades appear largely original to the ground and upper floors, being predominantly six pane upper and lower timber sash windows with mainly clear glazing. The ground-floor retail entry door is a later addition, as are some later doors and windows to the later rear ground-floor additions and alterations.

The Post Office interior is made up of three main sections, the carpeted front retail area, the vinyl floored mail sorting and storage area to the western side and staff facilities to the rear.

The interior walls to the ground-floor Post Office comprise rendered and painted double brickwork, fibre cement sheeting and timber and glass partitions. The retail area layout and finishes are modern in the standard Australia Post retail fitout in a predominantly grey colour scheme, comprising display wall panelling, laminated shelving and counter. The offices, sorting and storage areas have a predominantly light green and cream colour scheme and have a complete modern fitout, including doors, with the later additions. Original and early architraves have been retained in good condition.

Ceiling height varies at ground-floor level with the installation of air-conditioning ducting and services, and fabric includes plasterboard with scotia moulded cornices and square set acoustic tile to the retail area. The Post Office areas have banks of suspended and flush fluorescent lighting.

Large areas of original wall fabric appear to have been removed as a result of the additions and some original and early windows have been modified with the changes in use, especially concerning current wet areas. Air conditioning ducting is visible as an intrusion in the southern end post box areas. Any original features such as fireplaces have been removed at the ground-floor Post Office level, however a chimney breast corresponding with a chimney above is retained to the retail area, though completely obscured.

The residence comprises the eastern section of the ground floor to the rear, and the upper floor. The ground-floor concrete-floor laundry and tiled bathroom is a later skillion addition with asbestos cement sheeting and raked timber boarded ceiling. The rest of the ground-floor and upper-floor walls are of plastered and painted double brick, excepting the upper-floor bathroom and store to the northeastern corner, containing asbestos cement sheeting and timber board lining.

The ceiling to the ground floor is plaster and batten in the vinyl-tiled kitchen, with a scotia cornice, flush plaster with wide moulded cornice to the lounge room and v-joint timber boards to the main hallway and stair soffit. The upper-floor ceiling is completely v-joint timber boarded with a narrow ovolo cornice. Lighting to the upper floor is largely later pendants, and ceiling fans have been installed to the bedrooms and to the lounge and kitchen below.

The carpeted residence appears to retain its original spatial configuration of four upper-floor bedrooms and hall, lounge and services to the ground floor, excepting the later, tiled bathroom, wc and store addition and fitout. Original features retained include skirtings, picture rails, architraves, wall vents and face-brick fireplaces. The face-brick fireplaces have corbelled-brick brackets, timber mantle and cast iron grates to the lounge room and southwestern bedroom. There is a painted cast-iron Victorian fireplace to the northwestern bedroom on the upper floor with timber surround. The kitchen retains its original hearth with a timber-bracketed mantle over and early combustion stove, a "Canberra by Metters".

The central stair of the residence is original with turned timber posts, with a squared body and squared timber balusters. Floor-to-ceiling height timber panelling in excellent condition beneath the second flight, conceals under-floor storage and passage to a rear door and the verandah. The rear L-shaped verandah provides shelter to the rear ground-floor walls and access points.

The Casino Post Office and postcode signage is located across the centre of the entablature in simple lettering and there is a standard illuminated Australia Post sign freestanding to the eastern side at the footpath edge. A bank of public telephones is located against the western wall of the adjacent building to the east of the post office.

A cyclone wire fence and high security gates enclose the rear of Casino Post Office. There is a c. 1980s brick motorcycle shed is to the north in the concreted rear yard, with an adjacent timber shed to the grassed rear yard of the residence. The rear yard of the residence is separated from the Post Office yard by another high cyclone mesh fence. There is a steel framed and clad carport to the eastern side of the building adjacent to the residence.

To the north of the Post Office site is Telstra property, containing a large, intrusive telecommunications tower that dominates the roofscape of the civic centre of Casino. To the west of the building is the former CBC Bank, separated by a laneway to the rear yard. Prominent street lighting is well spaced to the side at the front of the post office.

The vegetation of the rear yard to the residence comprises garden beds of dense trees and shrubs, individual large trees, and to the front of the post office, isolated palm trees located at the footpath's edge.

The building was reported to be in good physical condition as at 22 June 2000, with medium archaeological potential.

Casino Post Office is substantially intact since the alterations and additions made in 1915, and retains the features which make it culturally significant including architectural features such as the classical porch, Ionic columns and overall scale, form and style.

=== Modifications and dates ===
The original building was completed in 1879, comprising four rooms, office, kitchen and stable.

The extension of the building to the street frontage, the erection of the classical portico and the addition of bathroom were requested and completed between 1889–1893.

The upper storey was completed c. 1915.

In around 1976, the later additions to the ground-floor Post Office sorting and storage area along the western boundary, new letter boxes and motorcycle shed appear to have been constructed.

Later alterations include the standard Australia Post fitout to the retail area of the mid-1990s.

== Heritage listing ==
Casino Post Office is significant at a State level for its historical associations, aesthetic qualities and social meaning.

Casino Post Office is historically significant because it has played a central role in the development of communication services in the town and the Upper Richmond River district. Casino Post Office also provides evidence of the changing nature of postal and telecommunications practices in NSW.

Casino Post Office is aesthetically significant because it a rare composition of the Victorian Italianate and Georgian Revival styles of architecture, and makes an important aesthetic contribution to the civic precinct in Casino. Casino Post Office is also associated with the Colonial Architect's Office under Walter Liberty Vernon.

Casino Post Office is also considered to be significant to the Casino community's sense of place.

Casino Post Office was listed on the New South Wales State Heritage Register on 23 June 2000 having satisfied the following criteria.

The place is important in demonstrating the course, or pattern, of cultural or natural history in New South Wales.

Casino Post Office is historically significant because it has played a central role in the development of communication services in the town and the Upper Richmond River district.

Casino Post Office also provides evidence of the changing nature of postal and telecommunications practices in NSW.

The additions made to Casino Post Office to improve the accommodation facilities for the residing postmasters reflects the changing requirements and standards in working conditions in NSW. Casino Post Office is associated with the NSW Government Architect's office under Walter Liberty Vernon.

The place is important in demonstrating aesthetic characteristics and/or a high degree of creative or technical achievement in New South Wales.

Casino Post Office is an architecturally distinct building incorporating a combination of the Victorian Italianate and Georgian Revival architectural styles, which such characteristics as the classical porch and ionic columns. As such, it is considered a unique country town post office with strong aesthetic value.

Casino Post Office is also the predominant architectural element in a diverse streetscape of Victorian, Edwardian and Inter-War period buildings. These qualities make it a landmark in the civic precinct of Casino.

The place has strong or special association with a particular community or cultural group in New South Wales for social, cultural or spiritual reasons.

As a prominent civic building, and an important link in the network of communications for the region, Casino Post Office is considered to be significant to the Casino community's sense of place.

The place has potential to yield information that will contribute to an understanding of the cultural or natural history of New South Wales.

The site has some potential to contain archaeological information that may provide information relating to the previous use of the site, and the evolution of the building and out-buildings associated with the use by the post office.

The place possesses uncommon, rare or endangered aspects of the cultural or natural history of New South Wales.

As an unusual example of a combination of Victorian Italianate and Georgian Revival architectural styles, Casino Post Office is considered to be a rare building in NSW.

The place is important in demonstrating the principal characteristics of a class of cultural or natural places/environments in New South Wales.

Casino Post Office is part of an important group of works by Government Architect Walter Liberty Vernon.

Casino Post Office is also considered to be a particularly clear example of the changing requirements for accommodating the postmaster during the early twentieth century in NSW post offices.
