= Glen Innes Post and Telegraph Office =

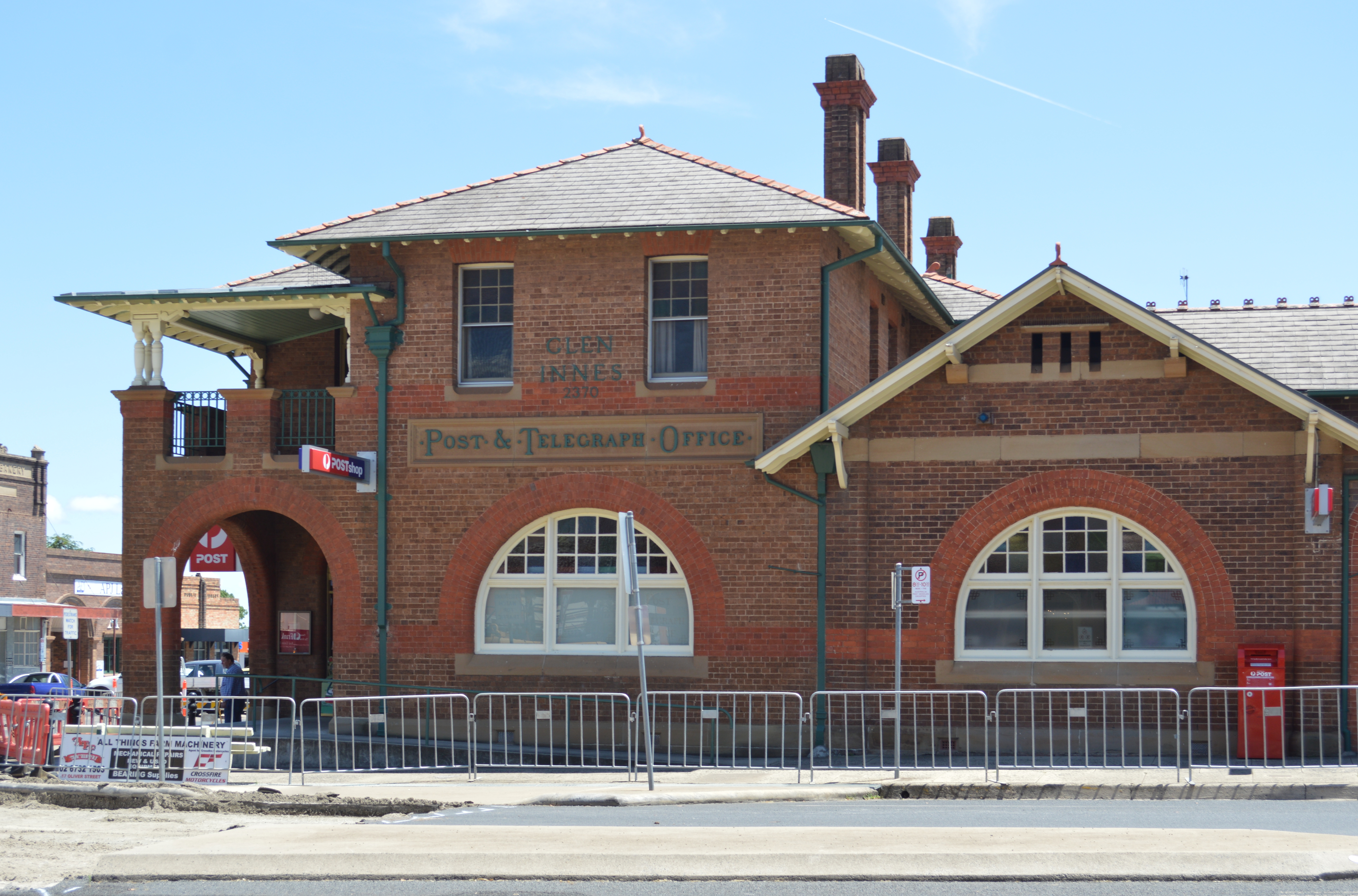

- Location within New South Wales Location within Australia
- 29.7368°S 151.7362°E
- Location: Grey Street, Glen Innes, Glen Innes Severn, New South Wales, Australia

History
- Built: 1895–1896

Site notes
- Architect: NSW Government Architect’s Office under Walter Liberty Vernon.
- Owner: Australia Post

New South Wales Heritage Register
- Official name: Glen Innes Post and Telegraph Office; Post Office; Glen Innes
- Type: state heritage (built)
- Designated: 23 June 2000
- Reference no.: 1406
- Type: Post Office
- Category: Postal and Telecommunications
- Builders: Sandbrook Brothers

Commonwealth Heritage List
- Official name: Glen Innes Post Office
- Type: Listed place (Historic)
- Designated: 08 November 2011
- Reference no.: 105494

Glen Innes Post and Telegraph Office is a heritage-listed post office at Grey Street, Glen Innes, in the New England region of New South Wales, Australia. It was designed by NSW Government Architect's Office under Walter Liberty Vernon. and built from 1895 to 1896 by Sandbrook Brothers. The property is owned by Australia Post. It was added to the New South Wales State Heritage Register on 23 June 2000. It was added to the Australian Commonwealth Heritage List on 8 November 2011.

== History ==
In 1828 the first post offices outside Sydney were established, with offices in Bathurst, Campbelltown, Parramatta, Liverpool, Newcastle, Penrith and Windsor. By 1839 there were forty post offices in the colony, with more opening as settlement spread. The advance of postal services was further increased as the railway network began to be established throughout NSW in the 1860s.

The appointment of James Barnet as Acting Colonial Architect in 1862 coincided with a considerable increase in funding for the public works program. Between 1865 and 1890 the Colonial Architects Office was responsible for the building and maintenance of 169 Post Offices and telegraph offices in NSW. The post offices constructed during this period were designed in a variety of architectural styles, as Barnet argued that the local parliamentary representatives always preferred "different patterns".

The 1890s witnessed a building boom in the town of Glen Innes with many of the grand public and commercial buildings along the main street being erected. In 1896 a new post office was constructed on the site of the former office which had been demolished to make way for it. The building was designed by the Office of the Colonial Architect under the direction of Walter Liberty Vernon, with the building tender being awarded to the Sandbrook Brothers for £2505. The office was opened for business on 7 December 1896.

A gable-ended addition to the east fronting Meade Street was constructed between 1913 and 1914. Major sympathetic additions to the east also appear to have occurred during a c. 1980s.

== Description ==
Glen Innes Post Office is a two-storey building designed in the Federation Arts and Crafts Style, constructed of predominantly tan-coloured face brickwork, rubbed red brick banding and sandstone detailing. The exterior of the building appears largely intact to its original construction. The original two-storey section of the building, built in 1895, is constructed in English bond brickwork on a sandstone ashlar block base course, with later single-storey sections to the rear being of stretcher bond brickwork. The building has a complex, predominantly hipped slate roof with decorative terracotta ridge-capping, bracketed eaves and boarded soffits. There is a bracketed gable end to the southern facade with a later-phase addition. The roof is punctuated by five corbelled face brick chimneys, four to the two-storey section and one over the existing kitchen to the rear.

Large arches dominate the main building facade with rubbed red-brick trim at the ground-floor level. There are two arched entries complemented by small, multi-pane arched windows with sandstone sills set into brickwork arches. The main entry, with a later tiled porch and steps, later doors and board and batten soffit, is located on the corner, the residential entry and porch, with bullnose slate steps, earlier hexagonal pavers and corrugated iron soffit, is at the centre of the western facade.

Glen Innes Post Office and residence was reported to generally in very good condition as at 22 June 2000. There is some archaeological potential to the remaining open areas of the site, including the residence yard and rear concrete yard for evidence of former structures and uses.

The Glen Innes Post Office appears largely intact structurally, and retains the features which make it culturally significant including architectural features such as the large round arches, hipped slate roof, arcaded porches at street level, along with the prominence of the building in the streetscape and its overall form, scale and style.

== Heritage listing ==
Glen Innes Post Office is significant at a State level for its historical associations, strong aesthetic qualities and social value. Glen Innes Post and Telegraph Office was listed on the New South Wales State Heritage Register on 23 June 2000 having satisfied the following criteria.

The place is important in demonstrating the course, or pattern, of cultural or natural history in New South Wales.

Glen Innes Post Office is historically significant because it is associated with the development of communications services in the New England district during the second half of the nineteenth century. Through its links with the earlier post offices in the town, the current post office is also associated with the historical evolution of Glen Innes.

The scale, form and architectural style of Glen Innes reflect the building boom in the mid-1890s in the main street of Glen Innes.

Glen Innes Post Office also provides evidence of the changing nature of postal and telecommunications practices in NSW. Glen Innes Post Office is historically significant because it is associated with the NSW Government Architect Walter Liberty Vernon, and it is part of an important group of works by Vernon, a key practitioner of the Federation Arts and Crafts Style.

The place is important in demonstrating aesthetic characteristics and/or a high degree of creative or technical achievement in New South Wales.

Glen Innes Post Office is aesthetically significant because it is a particularly fine example of the Federation Arts and Crafts Style, designed by Vernon, with strong visual appeal. It has such distinctive characteristics as the prominent roof forms, large arched openings and the arcaded porches.

The architectural style and prominent location of the post office also make it a focal point of the Glen Innes civic precinct, endowing it with landmark qualities.

The c. 1914 and 1980 additions have been carried out appropriately and are sympathetic to the aesthetic values of the original building.

The place has strong or special association with a particular community or cultural group in New South Wales for social, cultural or spiritual reasons.

As a prominent civic building, Glen Innes Post Office is considered to be significant to the community of Glen Innes' sense of place.

The place has potential to yield information that will contribute to an understanding of the cultural or natural history of New South Wales.

The site has some potential to contain an archaeological resource, which may provide information relating to the previous use of the site, and use associated with the post office.

The place possesses uncommon, rare or endangered aspects of the cultural or natural history of New South Wales.

Glen Innes Post Office is a particularly fine example of the work of the NSW Government Architect Walter Liberty Vernon.

The place is important in demonstrating the principal characteristics of a class of cultural or natural places/environments in New South Wales.

Glen Innes Post Office demonstrates the principle characteristics of the group of post offices constructed in the late nineteenth century in NSW by the Government Architect's Office.

Glen Innes Post Office is a strong example of the Federation Arts and Crafts style of architecture. It is also part of an important group of works by Government Architect Walter Liberty Vernon.
