= Millers Point Post Office =

Millers Point Post Office (former)
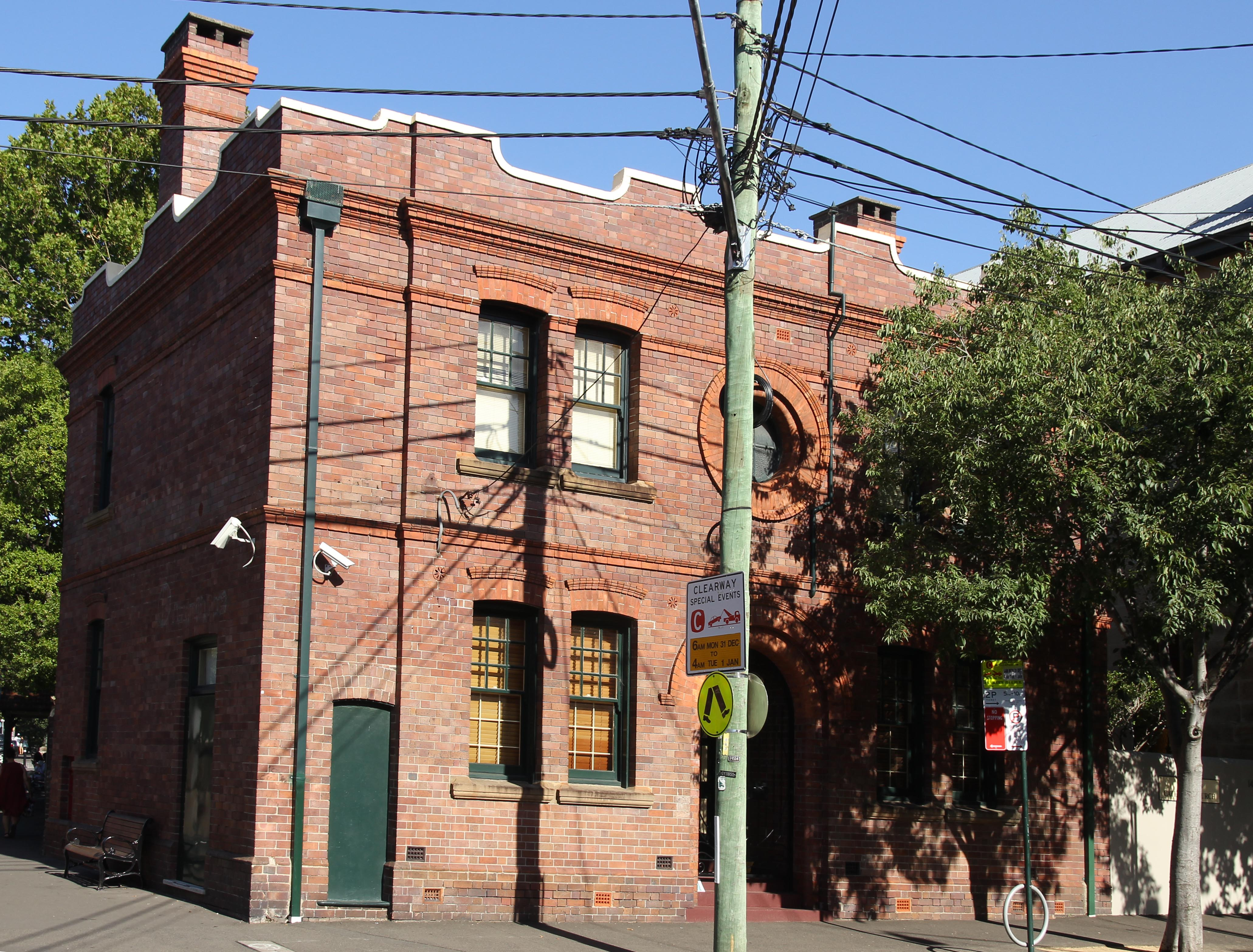
- The former Millers Point Post Office, located on the corner of Argyle and Kent Streets, pictured in 2019.

- Location within Sydney Location within Australia
- 33.8585°S 151.2038°E
- Location: 12 Kent Street, Millers Point, City of Sydney, New South Wales, Australia

History
- Built: 1900

Site notes
- Architect: NSW Government Architect;s Office under Walter Liberty Vernon
- Owner: Australia Post

New South Wales Heritage Register
- Official name: Millers Point Post Office
- Type: state heritage (built)
- Designated: 23 June 2000
- Reference no.: 1408
- Type: Post Office
- Category: Postal and Telecommunications

The Millers Point Post Office is a heritage-listed former post office and office building and now residence at 12 Kent Street, Millers Point, City of Sydney, New South Wales, Australia. It was designed by NSW Government Architect's Office under Walter Liberty Vernon. It was added to the New South Wales State Heritage Register on 23 June 2000.

== History ==
The first post office for Millers Point opened in 1878 in Argyle Street. The lease on this building was extended in 1887; however, it was considered too small and not in a convenient location. In August 1887 the office was relocated to 83 George Street North.

By 1891 considerable pressure from the Millers Point community saw plans for the erection of a post office on the corner of Kent and Argyle Street. The chosen site was occupied by a watchhouse for the Police Department which was removed in June 1891, and a new residence built for Sub Inspector Mitchell, Officer in Charge, Number Four Division, on the same site. However, it became evident that the location of this building was not quiet enough for a residence. Subsequently, it was agreed that the existing building could be utilised for the post office, on the condition that the post office built a suitable building in a quieter location for the Sub-Inspector.

On 31 December 1900 this building was opened as the new Millers Point Post Office, and remained so until the 1990s. The prominent corner location of this building ensured that the post office was situated in a much more convenient site for the local community.

In the late 1990s, the use of the building changed with the post office services only occupying the front corner of the ground floor. The remainder of the building was leased out as office space. An office tenant during this period was prominent lobbying firm Hawker Britton, which based its Sydney office in the building from 1999 to 2002.

The post office continued in a much reduced capacity until c. 2009, when the licensee was arrested in a high-profile fraud case, following which it was closed entirely.

In 2017, a development application was lodged with the City of Sydney seeking to change the use of the building from a mix of commercial office and residential use to only residential.

== Description ==
Millers Point Post Office is a simply detailed, square, two-storey Victorian reddish-pink Flemish and stretcher bond brick building in the Federation Free Classical Style. It has a single-storey, early brick outbuilding to the east, separated by a courtyard. The main building has a rendered and cream painted coping to a convoluted parapet that flattens out to the rear of the building, behind which is a hipped corrugated sheet metal roof with two corbelled brick chimneys and louvred dormer window to the east.

There is a round arched entry porch to Kent Street and painted stone steps, with stained glass fanlight and sidelights to the original timber door set back into the façade.

The entry is flanked by a pair of shallow arched sash windows (upper sash nine pane, lower one pane) with sandstone sills. The windows located above each at the ground floor have six upper panes and one lower, the oculus retaining six panes of ripple glass.

=== Modifications and dates ===
Some evidence exists of modifications to the Kent Street facade and timber boarded arched doorway.

The ground floor stair hall shows evidence of an infilled door to the northern wall, with a break in the painted-over dado, possibly from the time the Post Office and commercial office tenancies separated, date unknown. The installation of a storeroom beneath the stair, with the fibre cement infill to the north of the stair at ground floor, possibly occurred at around the same time.

Removal of central wall fabric to the Post Office area (northern half – ground floor) probably occurred for the Post Office tenancy, but possibly earlier to create a larger room.

Modern fitout and possibly infill of fireplaces to the Post Office area (northern half ground floor) c. mid-1990s.

Weatherboard and fibre cement sheet addition to the northern end of the outbuilding and later brick infill with installation of a later window to the western wall of the brick outbuilding, dates unknown.

Modern bathroom fitout to the upper floor, causing moisture damage to the architraves of the oculus, date of installation unknown, c. 1960–70s.

Ducting for services has also been constructed in the hallway behind the bathroom, date unknown.

== Heritage listing ==
The former Millers Point Post Office is a simply detailed, square, two-storey Victorian reddish-pink Flemish and stretcher bond brick building in the Federation Free Classical Style. It has a single-storey, early brick outbuilding to the east, separated by a courtyard. The main building has a rendered and cream painted coping to a convoluted parapet that flattens out to the rear of the building, behind which is a hipped corrugated sheet metal roof with two corbelled brick chimneys and louvred dormer window to the east.

Millers Point Post Office was listed on the New South Wales State Heritage Register on 23 June 2000 having satisfied the following criteria.

The place is important in demonstrating the course, or pattern, of cultural or natural history in New South Wales.

Millers Point Post Office is historically significant because it is associated with the development of the area into a busy inner city suburb of Sydney, as a separate suburb to the Rocks.

Millers Point Post Office is historically significant because it is associated with the development of communications services in Millers Point during the late nineteenth century and into the twentieth century, as the growing population required improved services.

The place is important in demonstrating aesthetic characteristics and/or a high degree of creative or technical achievement in New South Wales.

Millers Point Post Office is aesthetically significant because it is a fine example of the Federation Free Classical architectural style.

Millers Point Post Office is a simply detailed Federation Free Style corner building, set in a historically significant precinct, and contributes to the streetscape architecturally in both style and scale.

The architectural style and prominent corner location of Millers Point Post office also make it a local landmark.

The place has a strong or special association with a particular community or cultural group in New South Wales for social, cultural or spiritual reasons.

Millers Point Post Office is considered to be significant to the community of Millers Point's sense of place, as a well known local building and a focus for community meeting and activity.

The place has potential to yield information that will contribute to an understanding of the cultural or natural history of New South Wales.

The site of the Millers Point Post Office has some potential to contain archaeological information.

The place possesses uncommon, rare or endangered aspects of the cultural or natural history of New South Wales.

Built in 1891, Millers Point Post Office is a rare early example of the Federation Free Classical architectural style

The place is important in demonstrating the principal characteristics of a class of cultural or natural places/environments in New South Wales.

Millers Point Post Office is part of a group of works by the NSW Government Architect's Office under Walter Liberty Vernon. It is also an important part of the historic fabric of the highly significant Millers Point area

== See also ==
- Australian non-residential architectural styles
