= 182 Cumberland Street, The Rocks =

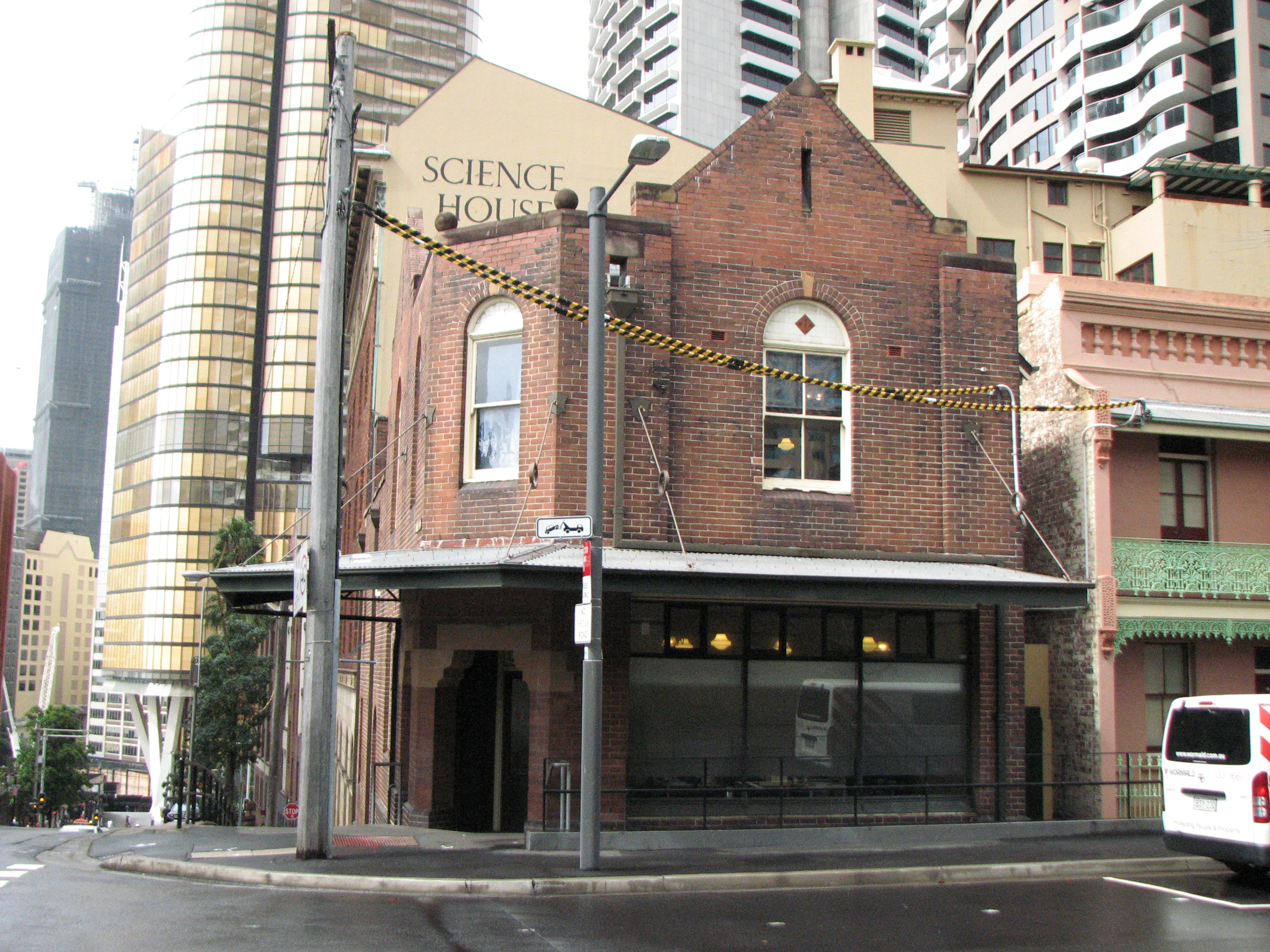
- 182 Cumberland Street, The Rocks, New South Wales

- Location within Sydney Location within Australia
- 33.8619°S 151.2060°E
- Location: 182 Cumberland Street, The Rocks, City of Sydney, New South Wales, Australia

History
- Built: 1911–1912

Site notes
- Architects: Walter Liberty Vernon; E. L. Drew (Assistant architect)
- Owner: Property NSW

New South Wales Heritage Register
- Official name: Shop and Residence
- Type: State heritage (built)
- Designated: 10 May 2002
- Reference no.: 1581
- Type: Shop
- Category: Retail and Wholesale

182 Cumberland Street, The Rocks is a heritage-listed retail building and residence located at 182 Cumberland Street, in the inner city Sydney suburb of The Rocks in the City of Sydney local government area of New South Wales, Australia. It was designed by Walter Liberty Vernon with the assistance of E. L. Drew and built from 1911 to 1912. The property is owned by Property NSW, an agency of the Government of New South Wales. It was added to the New South Wales State Heritage Register on 10 May 2002.

== History ==
Early maps of the area show a rectangular building located at the corner of Cumberland and Essex Streets as early as 1832. Rate books for the Council of the City of Sydney list a two-roomed, stone building with a shingled roof. The building was described as a house in rate books in 1852 but in 1853 was described as a shop with a "bake house at the back". The land was transferred to the Surveyor-General on 9 May 1834 and granted on 30 June 1834 to Aaron Byrne and Joseph Moss. On 13 February 1852 the property was sold to Samuel Watson, a grocer of Sydney.

At some time after the resumption of the property in 1902 by the NSW Government and prior to the construction of the present building in 1911/1912 the existing stone shop and house was demolished. This most likely occurred just prior to the construction of the present building as confectioner, Anders P Johnson is listed as the occupant of the building in 1907 and also from 1913 to 1918. The existing shop and dwelling at 182 Cumberland Street was designed in 1911 and possibly being completed in 1912. The original working drawings of the proposed scheme located in the Archives Office of NSW were signed by W. L. Vernon, Government Architect on 2 March 1911 and by E. L. Drew, Assistant Architect on 3 March 1911.

The building remained little changed until 1966, when some changes were proposed by the then owner, the Maritime Services Board. Prior to the conservation works undertaken in 1995-96, the building became derelict and was boarded up for some time. The building is now used as a shop and residence.

Archaeology Notes: granted as Lot 1, Section 64 to Aaron Byrne and Joseph Moss, executors of the will of Elizabeth Moss, 6 September 1834.

== Description ==
The two storey building at the corner of Cumberland and Essex Streets has brick parapet walls, with a slate roof behind. The part of the building on the corner is grander, with stepped sandstone lintels above the shop entry and windows and sandstone keystones above the first floor arched windows. The lower part of the building facing Essex Street features an arched brick entry doorway and does not have a parapet.

Style: Classic Free Style Edwardian; Facade: Brick; Internal Walls: Plastered brick walls; Roof Cladding: Slate.

=== Condition ===
As at 27 April 2001, Archaeology Assessment Condition: Partly disturbed. Assessment Basis: Terraced into hill slope.

=== Modifications and dates ===
- 26 January 1967 – The Council of the City of Sydney approved alterations to the building. The drawings were prepared by architect G. Rae clearly show that the building had remained substantially intact from 1912 until 1966. In G. Rae's alterations to the ground floor the original recessed corner entry was removed and replaced with a plate glass window, the walls around the store room behind the shop were demolished, the stairs down to the Essex Street level were demolished. On the first floor the brick walls around the south bedroom were removed.
- 1995–96 – Conservation works were undertaken on the building, to restore its former use as a shop and residence.

== Heritage listing ==
As at 26 June 2002, this shop and residence and site are of State heritage significance for their historical and scientific cultural values. The site and building are also of State heritage significance for their contribution to The Rocks area which is of State Heritage significance in its own right (see item no. 4500458).

The building is part of the Rocks Conservation Area and, as such, contributes to the overall character and interpretation of the area. It is one of the few remaining corner shops and residences within the area. It is representative of government-designed worker housing from the pre-World War I period. It is an example of the work of a well-known architect Walter Liberty Vernon. It is an excellent example of small-scale Classic Free Style Edwardian architecture and one of the most intact of such buildings in The Rocks (the others being the former morgue in George Street, the facade of the Brooklyn Hotel and the facade of the former Chamber of Commerce building on the corner of George and Grosvenor Streets).

High Significance Fabric: Brick walls; shop fronts; windows and doors; former shop and former store; former sitting room; WC; ceiling, floor boards and brick wall of enclosed verandah; former three bedrooms; bathroom; linen room; stair hall; former laundry; former entry hall (except door). Medium Significance Fabric: Small flight of stairs to staircase landing (former shop & former store); timber shelves (former laundry); concrete floor, plastered brick walls, ceiling, cornice and window of part of former back porch; new gutters, new downpipe at east elevation. Low Significance Fabric: Copper downpipes; new slate roof and metal roof; WC pan; wall basin (part of former back

Shop and Residence was listed on the New South Wales State Heritage Register on 10 May 2002 having satisfied the following criteria.

The place is important in demonstrating the course, or pattern, of cultural or natural history in New South Wales.

This shop and residence and site are of State heritage significance for their historical and scientific cultural values. The site and building are also of State heritage significance for their contribution to The Rocks area which is of State Heritage significance in its own right.

The building is part of the Rocks Conservation Area and, as such, contributes to the overall character and interpretation of the area. It is one of the few remaining corner shops and residences within the area.

The place is important in demonstrating aesthetic characteristics and/or a high degree of creative or technical achievement in New South Wales.

It is an example of the work of a well-known architect Walter Liberty Vernon. It is an excellent example of small-scale Classic Free Style Edwardian architecture and one of the most intact of such buildings in The Rocks (the others being the former morgue in George Street, the facade of the Brooklyn Hotel and the facade of the former Chamber of Commerce building on the corner of George and Grosvenor Streets).

High Significance Fabric: Brick walls; shop fronts; windows and doors; former shop and former store; former sitting room; WC (except smashed WC pan); ceiling, floor boards and brick wall of enclosed verandah; former three bedrooms; bathroom; linen room; stair hall; former laundry; former entry hall (except door). Medium Significance Fabric: Small flight of stairs to staircase landing (former shop & former store); timber shelves (former laundry); concrete floor, plastered brick walls, ceiling, cornice and window of part of former back porch; new gutters, new downpipe at east elevation. Low Significance Fabric: Copper downpipes; new slate roof and metal roof; WC pan; wall basin (part of former back).

The place is important in demonstrating the principal characteristics of a class of cultural or natural places/environments in New South Wales.

It is representative of government-designed worker housing from the pre-World War I period.

== See also ==
- Australian residential architectural styles
