= Pyrmont Post Office =

Pyrmont Post Office (former)
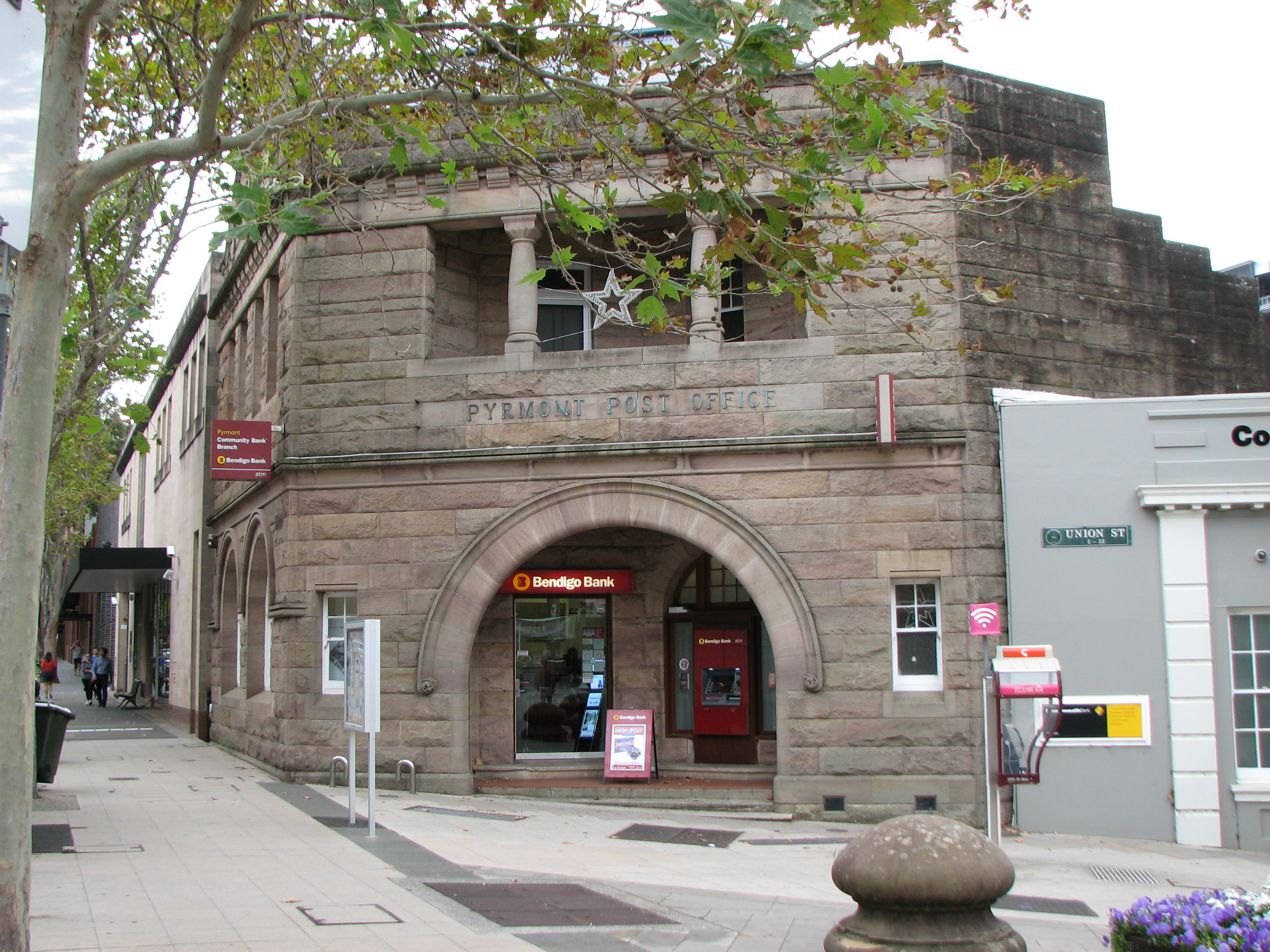
- Former Pyrmont Post Office, 2019

- Location within Sydney Location within Australia
- 33.8693°S 151.1940°E
- Location: 148 Harris Street, Pyrmont, Sydney, New South Wales, Australia

Site notes
- Architect: Government Architect’s Office under Walter Liberty Vernon
- Architectural style: Federation Free Style
- Owner: Australia Post

Commonwealth Heritage List
- Official name: Pyrmont Post Office
- Type: Listed place (Historic)
- Designated: 22 June 2004
- Reference no.: 105510

New South Wales Heritage Register
- Official name: Pyrmont Post Office
- Type: State heritage (built)
- Designated: 22 December 2000
- Reference no.: 1440
- Type: Post Office
- Category: Postal and Telecommunications

Pyrmont Post Office is a heritage-listed former post office and now bank branch office located at 148 Harris Street, in the inner city Sydney suburb of Pyrmont in the City of Sydney local government area of New South Wales, Australia. It was designed by the Government Architect’s Office under Walter Liberty Vernon. The property is owned by Australia Post, an agency of the Commonwealth Government of Australia. It was added to the Australian Commonwealth Heritage List on 22 June 2004 and to the New South Wales State Heritage Register on 22 December 2000.

== History ==
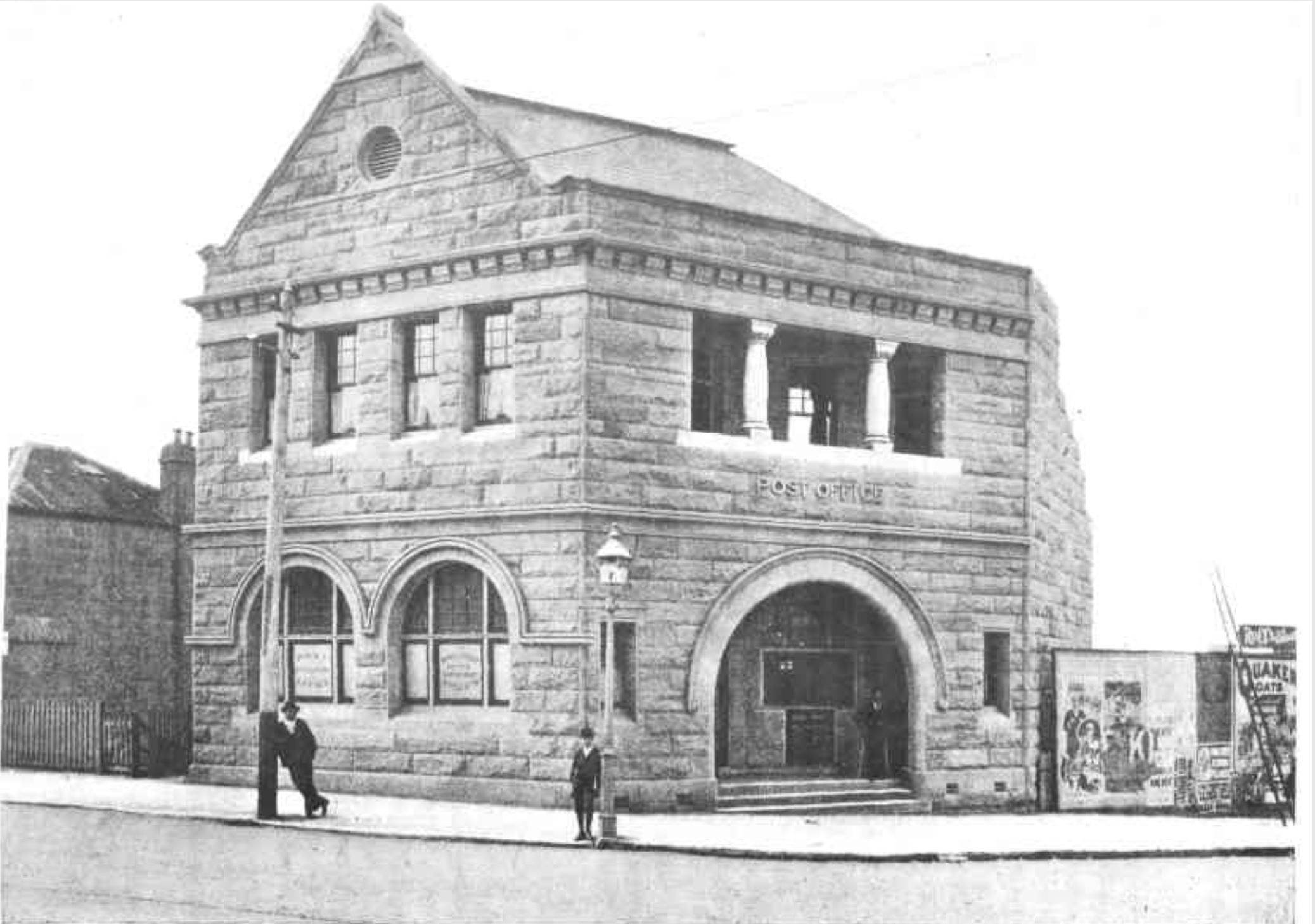
Pyrmont Post Office, 1902

=== History of Pyrmont ===
Pyrmont was isolated from early Sydney and initial development in the area was generally related to waterfront industries, such as shipyards. The establishment of the Australasian Steam Navigation Company shipyard on Darling Island, plus several other industrial enterprises, including Charles Saunders' stone quarry, brought a residential population of workers, though anyone of means tended to travel to the area from somewhere more desirable. The opening of the Pyrmont Bridge across Darling Harbour in the 1850s facilitated development in both industry and population. Several large businesses became established in Pyrmont in the late nineteenth century, including Colonial Sugar Refinery (CSR) and the woolstores began to move here during the 1880s. A new bridge in 1901, the opening of the power stations (Ultimo Power Station in 1899 and Pyrmont Power Station in 1904) and the extension of wharfage around the waterfront from Darling Harbour cemented the industrial character of the peninsula and it remained this way until after the end of World War II. With only a few notable exceptions, residential development remained largely working class and in fact progressively reduced in size as the new industries demolished housing to accommodate larger premises. After World War II, though, most of the characterising industries either ceased operating or moved to other locations. Since the 1970s, redevelopment of the area has moved slowly, with numerous schemes and proposals. Many of the industrial buildings have been demolished or converted to other uses.

=== Australian postal history ===
The first official postal service in Australia was established in April 1809, when the Sydney merchant Isaac Nichols was appointed as the first Postmaster in the colony of NSW. Prior to this, mail had been distributed directly by the captain of the ship on which the mail arrived, however this system was neither reliable nor secure.

In 1825 the colonial administration was empowered to establish a Postmaster General's Department, which had previously been administered from Britain.

In 1828 the first post offices outside of Sydney were established, with offices in Bathurst, Campbelltown, Parramatta, Liverpool, Newcastle, Penrith and Windsor. By 1839 there were forty post offices in the colony, with more opened as settlement spread. During the 1860s, the advance of postal services was further increased as the railway network began to be established throughout NSW. In 1863, the Postmaster General WH Christie noted that accommodation facilities for Postmasters in some post offices was quite limited, and stated that it was a matter of importance that "post masters should reside and sleep under the same roof as the office".

The first telegraph line was opened in Victoria in March 1854 and in NSW in 1858. The NSW colonial government constructed two lines from the GPO, one to the South Head Signal Station, the other to Liverpool. Development was slow in NSW compared to the other states, with the Government concentrating on the development of country offices before suburban ones. As the line spread, however, telegraph offices were built to accommodate the operators. Unlike the Post Office, the telegraph office needed specialised equipment and could not be easily accommodated in a local store or private residence. Post and telegraph offices operated separately until 1870 when the departments were amalgamated, after which time new offices were built to include both postal and telegraph services. In 1881 the first telephone exchange was opened in Sydney, three years after the first tests in Adelaide. As with the telegraph, the telephone system soon began to extend into country areas, with telephone exchanges appearing in country NSW from the late 1880s onwards. Again the Post Office was responsible for the public telephone exchange, further emphasising its place in the community as a provider of communications services.

The appointment of James Barnet as Acting Colonial Architect in 1862 coincided with a considerable increase in funding to the public works program. Between 1865 and 1890 the Colonial Architects Office was responsible for the building and maintenance of 169 Post Offices and telegraph offices in NSW. The post offices constructed during this period featured in a variety of architectural styles, as Barnet argued that the local parliamentary representatives always preferred "different patterns".

The construction of new post offices continued throughout the Depression years under the leadership of Walter Liberty Vernon, who held office from 1890 to 1911. While twenty-seven post offices were built between 1892 and 1895, funding to the Government Architect's Office was cut from 1893 to 1895, causing Vernon to postpone a number of projects.

Following Federation in 1901, the Commonwealth Government took over responsibility for post, telegraph and telephone offices, with the Department of Home Affairs Works Division being made responsible for post office construction. In 1916 construction was transferred to the Department of Works and Railways, with the Department of the Interior responsible during World War II.

On 22 December 1975 the Postmaster General's Department was abolished and replaced by the Post and Telecommunications Department. This was the creation of Telecom and Australia Post. In 1989, the Australian Postal Corporation Act established Australia Post as a self-funding entity, heralding a new direction in property management, including a move away from the larger more traditional buildings towards smaller shop front style post offices.

For much of its history, the post office has been responsible for a wide variety of community services including mail distribution, an agency for the Commonwealth Savings Bank, electoral enrolments, and the provision of telegraph and telephone services. The town post office has served as a focal point for the community, most often built in a prominent position in the centre of town close to other public buildings, creating a nucleus of civic buildings and community pride.

=== Pyrmont Post Office ===
The first Post Office in Pyrmont was opened in April 1852 as a sub-office, receiving and delivering letters within the rapidly growing Pyrmont/Ultimo area. The first subdivisions of land within Pyrmont had been held in December 1839, with most of the lots having been sold and developed by 1843. By the early 1850s a number of major developments were beginning to transform the Pyrmont peninsula as large-scale industry sought to established itself there. Industries such as shipbuilding and quarrying attracted workers to settle in the area who in turn encouraged the growth of infrastructure. In 1858 the Pyrmont Bridge was constructed, linking the peninsula to the town of Sydney, further encouraging the development of Pyrmont.

From 1 July 1871, money orders became available from Pyrmont Post Office, with a branch of the Government Savings Bank opening from October 1871. The introduction of money orders and Government Savings Banks into Pyrmont indicates that by this time the Post Office had been upgraded from a sub-branch to an official office.

With an increase in the population of the area throughout the 1870s and 1880s, local residents began to petition for a new Post and Telegraph Office for Pyrmont. Pyrmont did not have a telegraph office as all telegraphs were delivered via the GPO in Sydney. By the early 1880s approximately 1000 telegrams per week were being delivered to the Pyrmont/Ultimo area, underlining the need for a telegraph office.

A temporary post office existed for some years in Harris Street before the local Member of the Legislative Assembly, Francis Abigail, requested a more substantial facility in 1882. Premises were rented from Francis Buckle in Union Street and Frederick Lassre was appointed postmaster, a position he held until his death in 1905. In July 1882 the Post Master General advertised for tenders to lease a new building in Pyrmont for use as a Post and Telegraph Office. Following the advertisement, a number of sites along the peninsula were reviewed with the majority being based around Harris and Union Streets. Of the applicants, seven were eventually shortlisted, with an eight-room shop/residence in Union Street close to the junction of Harris Street being leased from Mr F Buckler for £100pa. In contrast to post offices in other districts, Pyrmont Post Office had two long-term postal officers in its founding years. The first Postmistress, Elizabeth Fleming, served in Pyrmont from 1853 until 1881, after which her son Charles Fleming continued as Postmaster from 1881 until 1896. It was common during this period for postmistresses or postmasters to leave the job due to its poor pay and demanding nature, particularly when an office was still a sub-branch or unofficial office. Many had other jobs, running the postal business from a store or inn that they may also have operated.

Pressure to build an official office was again placed on the Post Master General by Pyrmont residents during the 1890s, and by 1899 a site for a new office had been secured. The new office was designed by New South Wales Government Architect Walter Liberty Vernon and built by day labour at a cost of £4,347. The Minister for Public Works, Edward William O'Sullivan, officially opened it on 19 January 1901. The office was built using surplus Pyrmont sandstone from the construction of the General Post Office (GPO) and Customs House buildings. The office was two storeys with a basement. The basement originally held the kitchen, dining room, laundry and bathroom, the ground floor housed the main office space and one bedroom, with three more bedrooms on the first floor. It continued to function as the post office for Pyrmont for many years and remains a key part of the civic centre.

Renovations were carried out on the building during the 1950s when the original entry door was relocated to the western end of the building and Post Boxes were installed.

In December 2009, the post office building became the Pyrmont Community Branch of the Bendigo Bank.

== Description ==
Pyrmont Post Office is located in a prominent position at 148 Harris Street, corner Union Street, Pyrmont, fronting onto Union Square. It was built in 1901 in the Federation Free Style, and is a two-storey, rock-faced, ashlar block building with a basement. The two-storey section of the building has a complex hipped, Marseille tiled roof sited behind a gable-ended parapet on Harris Street that continues straight across the truncated corner of the building and steps down to the rear. The lower skillion sections of roof are clad with corrugated iron. Three rock-faced sandstone chimneys punctuate the roofline, one at each roof level stepping down towards the rear. The Union Street facade faces the splayed corner of the block and has a massive ground floor entry arch. Over the arch is a dressed and moulded stone archivolt ending in rosettes. On either side is a small sash window. Above the arch, on the first floor, is a balcony with two columns. Above this is a stone cornice supported by scrolls and then there is a parapet which steps down behind where the post office abuts the bank next door. There is a string course between the floors. On the Harris Street elevation the ground floor is dominated by two Diocletian windows with dressed and moulded archivolts. The first floor has four sash windows, which like all the windows feature multiple panes in the upper half or upper sash. The parapeted gable has a round vent and the gable ends in a scroll. The basement was originally part of the living quarters of the postmaster. The Diocletian windows, the parapeted gable with scroll, the contrast between rough and smooth stonework and the use of multiple panes in the upper sashes are all features of Federation Free Style design, of which Vernon was a notable practitioner. The building is a prominent one, fronting onto Pyrmont Square and its scale and materials assist the cohesiveness of this central precinct.

There is a continuous dentilled string course below the parapet, as well as carved coping, and a shaped stone string course below the first floor. Each street facade is symmetrical and label moulds decorate the ground-floor arched windows of the Harris Street facade and the wide ground-floor arch of the main entry porch. It is a smooth archway with carved label mould ends. Some of the smaller squared windows have thick stone lintels and all the window frames have been painted white.

There is a first-floor balcony on the symmetrical, truncated corner of the building. The sandstone balustrade has rounded coping, supporting two thick sandstone columns. It has a v-joint boarded soffit, green painted concrete floor and a single pendant light at the centre. The ground-floor entry porch is housed behind the entry arch, and has a boarded soffit with a moulded cornice and attached fluorescent lighting. The floor has modern red tiles and there is a four-panelled early door to the right and a modern timber and glass door to the left, serving as the retail entry. The basement level has two concrete porches positioned on either side of the former laundry at the rear. Timber posts sit on concrete pedestals and support the skillion roof with a boarded soffit and attached fluorescent lights.

The basement level of Pyrmont Post Office remains divided in half as per the original construction of the building, keeping the residence and post office facilities separate. The flooring of the entire basement level is sheet vinyl, excepting the modern tiled bathrooms of the post office area. The post office half of the building has been substantially modified from early plans and currently houses staff facilities including toilets and a lunch room. The residential half to the rear of the building comprises a kitchen, dining room, laundry (not inspected) and store room.

Ceilings in the basement of the residence are square set plaster with intrusive, attached fluorescent lighting. The post office side of the basement level has a combination of fibre cement ceilings and square set plaster. Walls of the entire basement level are predominantly rendered and painted masonry in a cream colour scheme, with blind arches adjacent to the two retained fireplaces of the residence. The residence retains a high picture rail in the former dining room, with a cut render dado rail to the rest of the rooms, excepting the small store room. Wide moulded skirtings and architraves appear to be original or early. The Post Office side has later skirting along with a modern fitout, with some original or early architraves retained to the window and external door.

Windows to the residence basement are generally nine pane upper and single pane lower timber sash windows with some modifications from air conditioner/exhaust fan installations. Internal doors are four and six panelled, two original doors in the east walls of the kitchen and dining room have been removed. There is a single fanlight over the southern dining room door and the adjacent external door. The Post Office basement level has a squared multi-pane window and a louvred window to the male toilet. Doors to this area are modern flush doors.

The ground floor of the Post Office comprises the retail area at the front. There is a small mail room/post box area behind the counter and an office and store room within the former residence space on the next level up, accessed via the main stair and a later constructed stair at the north. There is a small area of sheet vinyl at the front staff entry to the right of the entry porch.

The ceilings on the ground floor are a combination of square set plaster in the office and adjacent store room, shallow vaulted corrugated iron and concrete in the safe room and set plaster with a moulded cornice and exposed beams in the retail area. There are both suspended and attached fluorescent lights located on the ground floor, as well as an attached air conditioning unit on the ceiling of the retail area.

Architraves are largely original, with some modern architraves to later and altered openings. There is also some minor damage to some detailing through later modification. Some original skirting has been retained, excepting the modern fitout in the retail area.

The retail area and office have modern sliding doors, as well as retaining some original or early six panel internal doors. Windows in the front facades include multi-pane, arched windows with casement lower panes, and four to nine pane upper and single lower pane squared sash windows. There are fanlights retained over the internal doors to the office and adjacent store room.

The ground-floor walls are painted and rendered masonry in a pastel pink and grey colour scheme. The retail area has a standard Australia Post fitout incorporating a grey colour scheme and some partition walls forming the retail counter area. Three chimney breasts have been retained in the ground floor and a surround has been retained in the office, however the rest are currently concealed behind wall panelling.

The first floor is currently vacant, previously in use as the postal residence. It comprises three carpeted bedrooms, a sheet vinyl floored c. 1950s fitout bathroom and timber-floored storage room. Square set plaster ceilings, with some cracking evident, are located on the first floor with pendant light fittings excepting the fluorescent light to the store room. Architraves and skirting appear to be original or early, excepting the c. 1950s bathroom fitout and tiling. There is a cut dado rail in the bathroom. The first floor retains four and six panel original or early doors. Windows are predominantly nine pane upper and single pane lower sash squared windows and there are fanlights located over all internal doorways excepting the bathroom. The walls of this level are painted and rendered masonry in a pastel pink colour scheme with grey and white detailing. Two fireplaces have been retained in the first floor with cast iron basket grates, tiled inserts and timber surrounds.

There are two stairs accessing the various levels of the building. The original carpeted main stair on the southern side accesses all three levels of the former residence and joins with the Post Office side at the ground floor. It has polished, painted, and turned timber posts and balusters, carved brackets and original or early skirting. The original flight of stairs accessing the basement level of the Post Office matches the main stair, with sheet vinyl treads.

Signage on the Post Office is limited to the verdigris brass lettering "Pyrmont Post Office" above the first floor string course, a standard "Australia Post" sign attached to the right side of the Harris Street facade and smaller location and information signs located within the ground-floor porch area.

The surrounding streetscape of Pyrmont Post Office is predominantly two to three-storey nineteenth to early-twentieth century mixed-use buildings, with Star City Casino dominating the roofscape to the rear of the site. The building fronts onto the paved and terraced Union Square, which retains several trees and recent flower plantings. There is a war memorial near the front of the building within the Square and seating and public phones have been provided. There are also recent street tree plantings along Harris Street.

The only outbuilding within the site is a small recent metal shed located at the centre and to the rear boundary of the site. It is located within the bitumen paved rear yard, which is enclosed by a tubular steel and corrugated iron fence. Access to the yard is via a narrow passageway along the northern boundary stepping down from Harris Street through a security gate.

=== Condition ===
As at 1996, the building was still in use as a post office and is in good condition, with a high level of integrity. The entrance was slightly altered in the 1950s. As at 4 August 2000, the building was generally in very good condition, with particular reference to the exterior. The archaeological potential of the site is considered high for evidence of early uses of the site. Pyrmont Post Office is substantially intact to its original form. It retains the features that make it culturally significant, including details such as the sandstone exteriors, large round arched entrance and stone parapet and gable, as well as its overall form and style.

=== Modifications and dates ===
Pyrmont Post Office, as it stands today, was completed in 1901. It is a two-storey sandstone building with basement, providing a Post Office area to the front half of the building and three-storey residence to the rear half. In c. 1950 the original front entry was altered with the rearrangement of the interior ground floor. Post boxes were installed in their current locations and the current entry door replaced an existing telephone booth. This is possibly when the reconfiguration of the Post Office basement section also occurred.

=== Further information ===
Physical condition and/or Archaeological potential – The building is generally in very good condition, with particular reference to the exterior. There has, however, been substantial moisture damage to paintwork and some plaster. This has occurred within several ceilings and walls, particularly to the first floor and the underside of the main stair, with paint peeling in the basement level. All levels show evidence of general wear and tear. The archaeological potential of the site is considered high for evidence of early uses of the site or previous structures, with the open rear yard currently paved in bitumen and little evidence of other works within the site boundary since first construction.

== Heritage listing ==
Pyrmont Post Office, dating from 1901, has historical importance for its association with the development of Pyrmont/Ultimo which, by the turn of the century, was a key industrial and warehouse suburb of inner Sydney. The construction of a permanent postal building, at the time, illustrates the consolidation of the peninsula's infrastructure during the period. Sited prominently on a major intersection fronting onto Pyrmont Square and complementing other buildings nearby, the post office is an important element in the streetscape.

As at 4 August 2000, Pyrmont Post Office is significant at a State level for its historical associations, strong aesthetic qualities and social value.

Pyrmont Post Office is linked with the original post office established in 1852, and as such is associated with the early development of the Pyrmont/Ultimo area. Pyrmont Post Office is historically significant because it is associated with the population growth in the area during the late nineteenth century, which was the result of its development as a key industrial and warehouse suburb in Sydney. The Post Office was also an important part of the consolidation of communications services to the Pyrmont/Ultimo community. The building has a history of continuous original use that spans almost a century. The unusual architectural footprint of the building reflects the difficulty with designing and constructing new buildings in already well-established suburbs in Sydney. Pyrmont Post Office also provides evidence of the development of workers' conditions in NSW, particularly with regard to the level of self-containment of the residence.

Pyrmont Post Office is aesthetically significant because it is a distinctive example of the Federation Free Style of architecture, and makes an important contribution to Pyrmont's historic civic precinct. The architectural style and prominent location of the post office also make it a local landmark. Pyrmont Post Office is also associated with the NSW Government Architect's Office under Walter Liberty Vernon, a key practitioner of the Federation Free Style of architecture. Pyrmont Post Office is also considered to be significant to the community of Pyrmont's sense of place.

=== Australian Commonwealth Heritage List ===
Pyrmont Post Office was listed on the Australian Commonwealth Heritage List on 22 June 2004 having satisfied the following criteria.

Criterion D: Characteristic values

The building, with its Diocletian and other windows, its contrasting finishes to stonework, its parapeted gable with scroll and other features reflects well the characteristics of Federation Free style architecture.

Criterion H: Significant people

Additional significance is attributable to the fact that the building was designed by New South Wales (NSW) Government Architect, W. L. Vernon.

=== New South Wales State Heritage Register ===
Pyrmont Post Office was listed on the New South Wales State Heritage Register on 22 December 2000 having satisfied the following criteria.

The place is important in demonstrating the course, or pattern, of cultural or natural history in New South Wales.

Pyrmont Post Office is associated with the early development of the area, as it is linked with the original post office established in 1852. The construction of a new, larger building in 1901 reflects the development of the area as a key industrial and warehouse suburb of Sydney, which resulted in the growth of the local population during the end of the nineteenth century. The growing community required improved services, and lobbied for a new post office.

The Post Office was also an important part of the consolidation of communications services to the Pyrmont/Ultimo community. The building has a history of continuous original use that spans almost a century.

Pyrmont Post Office provides evidence of the development of workers' conditions in NSW, particularly with regard to the level of self-containment of the residence. The residence at Pyrmont included the laundry and kitchen, which differs from post offices constructed up to the 1880s. These facilities were previously housed separately from the main building and added later.

The unusual architectural footprint of the building reflects the difficulty with designing and constructing new buildings in well-established suburbs in Sydney. Pyrmont Post Office was designed by the NSW Government Architect's Office under Walter Liberty Vernon, a key practitioner of the Federation Free Style of architecture.

The place is important in demonstrating aesthetic characteristics and/or a high degree of creative or technical achievement in New South Wales.

Pyrmont Post Office is aesthetically significant because it is a distinctive example of the Federation Free Style of architecture in NSW. Constructed predominantly of sandstone, Pyrmont Post Office is a visually pleasing element in the historic civic precinct of Pyrmont.

The use of stone as a walling material is comparable with earlier post office designs at Cooma (1879) and Wilcannia (1880), and its design compares with Burwood Post Office (1892).

Located in the Pyrmont Square Group, the Post Office forms part of a significant late Victorian and Federation period streetscape, which is the focal point of the Pyrmont urban area.

The place has a strong or special association with a particular community or cultural group in New South Wales for social, cultural or spiritual reasons.

Pyrmont Post Office was constructed after the local community lobbied the Post Master General for improved services to the area. It has also been the centre of communications in Pyrmont for almost a century, and is an important part of the civic precinct. As such, it is considered to be significant to the Pyrmont community's sense of place.

The place has potential to yield information that will contribute to an understanding of the cultural or natural history of New South Wales.

Pyrmont Post Office has some potential to provide archaeological information about the previous use of the site.

The place possesses uncommon, rare or endangered aspects of the cultural or natural history of New South Wales.

Pyrmont Post Office is a largely intact as per its original form, which is rare for post offices in NSW. The unusual architectural footprint of the building adds to its rarity.

The place is important in demonstrating the principal characteristics of a class of cultural or natural places/environments in New South Wales.

Pyrmont Post Office is a strong example of the Federation Free style of architecture. It is part of a group of post offices designed by the NSW Government Architect Office under Walter Liberty Vernon.

== See also ==
- List of post office buildings in New South Wales
