= Annandale Post Office =

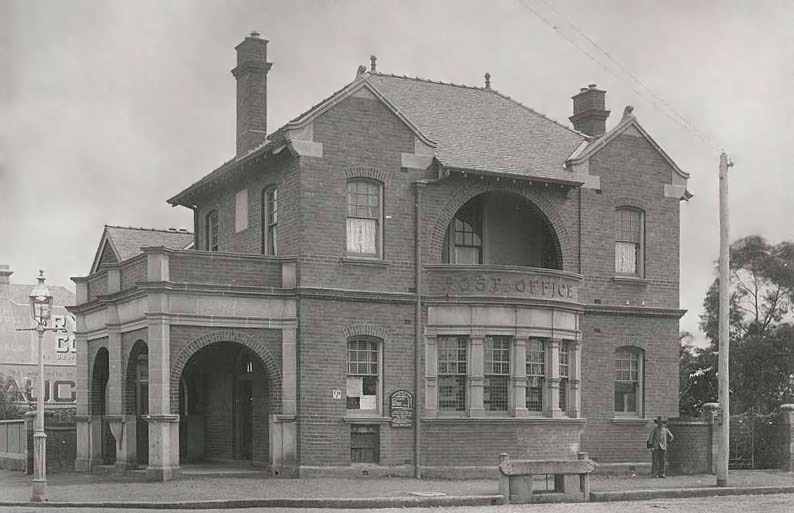
- An historical image of the post office, from NSW State Records
- Interactive map of the Annandale Post Office area

General information
- Status: Completed
- Type: Post office
- Architectural style: Federation Free Classical
- Location: 115–117 Booth Street, Annandale, New South Wales, Australia
- Coordinates: 33°52′52″S 151°10′14″E
- Construction started: 1895
- Completed: 1896
- Owner: Australia Post

Technical details
- Material: Brick, Sydney sandstone and timber, with terracotta tile roof
- Floor count: 2

Design and construction
- Architect: Walter Liberty Vernon
- Architecture firm: New South Wales Government Architect

Website
- Annandale Post Office

The Annandale Post Office (postcode: 2038) is a post office located at 115–117 Booth Street, on the junction with Johnston Street, in Annandale, a suburb of Sydney, New South Wales, Australia. The post office is owned and operated by Australia Post, an agency of the Australian Government.

== History ==
Petitioning for the construction of a post office in the municipality occurred from as early as 1891; however it was not until 1894 when local councillors approached the Member for Annandale William Mahony to secure funding. The building was built between 1895 and 1896 under the supervision of the New South Wales Government Architect Walter Liberty Vernon in the Federation Free Classical style and has been in continual operation as a post office since that time. Constructed of brick, Sydney sandstone and timber, with terracotta tile roof, the two-storey building comprises many fine details of the style such as a single storey colonnade or portico shelter consisting of large stone piers with square half-columns set at 45 degrees, special moulded bricks are seen on the numerous arches as well as horizontal bands which continue the line of the stone window sills. The roof features several gable ends on both elevations and raked eaves with exposed, decoratively cut rafter ends. The Johnston Street facade the ground floor consists of a central curved bay window with double hung windows with multi-paned upper sashes and single double hung windows on either side.

An additional post office was located on Parramatta Road in the locale of Westgate, south of Annandale, constructed in 1913. The post office was subsequently decommissioned and converted into apartments with its postal functions now carried out by the Westgate local post office, at 203 Parramatta Road.

== See also ==
- Australian non-residential architectural styles
- List of post offices in New South Wales
