= Walter Liberty Vernon =

English-Australian architect (1846–1914)

Colonel Walter Liberty Vernon VD FRIBA
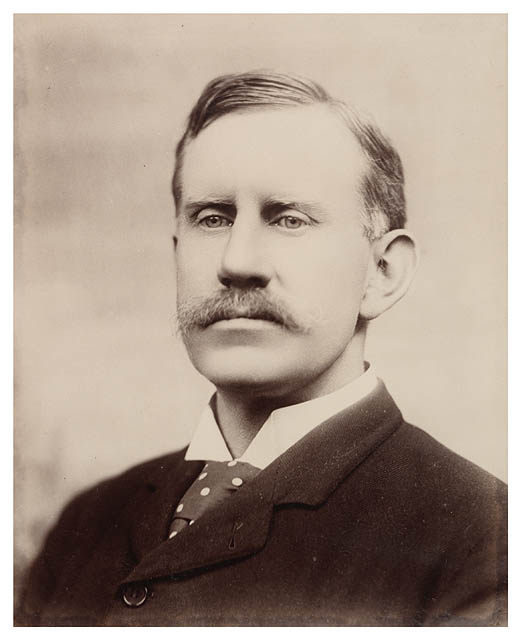

10th New South Wales Government Architect
- In office 1 August 1890 – 11 August 1911
- Preceded by: George McRae
- Succeeded by: James Barnet

10th Mayor of East St Leonards
- In office 9 February 1887 – 18 February 1888
- Preceded by: George Ranken
- Succeeded by: Patrick William Glacken

Alderman of the Borough of East St Leonards
- In office 4 March 1885 – 29 July 1890
- Ward: East Ward (1889–1890)

Alderman of the Municipality of North Sydney
- In office 29 July 1890 – 10 February 1891

Personal details
- Born: 11 August 1846 High Wycombe, Buckinghamshire, England
- Died: 17 January 1914 (aged 67) Darlinghurst, New South Wales, Australia
- Resting place: Gore Hill Cemetery
- Spouse: Margaret Anne Jones
- Children: Hugh Venables Vernon; Geoffrey Hampden Vernon
- Education: Royal Academy of Arts; South Kensington School of Art
- Occupation: Architect

Military service
- Allegiance: Colony of New South Wales; Australia
- Branch/service: New South Wales Colonial Forces; Citizen Military Forces
- Years of service: 1885–1910
- Rank: Colonel
- Commands: New South Wales Lancers
- Awards: Queen Victoria Diamond Jubilee Medal (1897); Volunteer Officers' Decoration (1905)

Colonel Walter Liberty Vernon, VD, FRIBA (11 August 1846 – 17 January 1914) was an English architect who migrated to Australia and pursued his career as an architect in Sydney, New South Wales. In his role as the New South Wales Government Architect he is noted for designing multiple government buildings, many of which are extant with listings on national and state heritage registers.

== Early life ==
Vernon was born 11 August 1846 in High Wycombe, Buckinghamshire, England, the son of a banker's clerk, Robert Vernon and Margaret Liberty. He was articled in 1862 to a London architect, W. G. Habershon, and studied at the Royal Academy of Arts and South Kensington School of Art. After completing his studies, he pursued a practice as an architect in London and married Margaret Anne Jones in 1870 at Newport, Wales. His London practice was successful, but he suffered from bronchial asthma and received medical advice to leave England. He migrated to Australia and arrived in Sydney in November 1883.

== Career in Australia ==
Vernon established a private practice in Sydney, and then partnered with William Wardell from 1884 until 1889. Vernon assisted with works already in progress, designed buildings and supervised Wardell's Melbourne projects in 1884–85. Vernon was an alderman on East St Leonards Municipal Council in 1885–90, serving a single term as Mayor from 1887 to 1888. When the Borough of East St Leonards amalgamated to form the Municipality of North Sydney on 29 July 1890, Vernon was an Alderman of the new council, but did not seek re-election when his term expired in February 1891. Elected a fellow of the Royal Institute of British Architects in 1885, he joined the (Royal) Art Society of New South Wales in 1884, (Sir) John Sulman's Palladian Club and the Institute of Architects of New South Wales in 1887, and the Sydney Architectural Association in 1891.

On 1 August 1890, Vernon was appointed as the New South Wales Government Architect, however his staff numbers were reduced significantly. Vernon showed that the system of design competitions were twice as expensive and the activities of this office were boosted in 1894 when extra funding was committed as a way of creating relief work during the Depression of the 1890s.

As an architect practising in Australia, Vernon favoured what were later known as the Federation styles, such as the Free Classical, Arts and Crafts, and Free Style.

Examples of the former were his fire station in St Johns Road, Glebe, Jenolan Caves House in the Blue Mountains and the Public School, Military Road, Mosman. Examples of the latter were his fire stations in The Avenue, Randwick; Darlinghurst Road, Darlinghurst; and Pyrmont Street, Pyrmont. Another example of Federation Free Style is the former police station, Taylor Square, Darlinghurst. In a stylistic departure, he designed the (former) police station in Bourke Street, Surry Hills, in the Romanesque style.

For more substantial public buildings, Vernon continued the tradition whereby such buildings were designed in a Classical style. Notable examples were the Art Gallery of New South Wales, the Mitchell Library (part of the State Library), Central railway station and Newcastle Court House. The Art Gallery has been described as "masterly symmetry featuring Ionic colonnades." Central Station has been described as "the grandest railway station in Australia."

Vernon also designed significant additions to existing buildings, such as Customs House in Circular Quay; Randwick Police Station; the Chief Secretary's Building, Sydney; Balranald Post Office; Armidale Post Office; and the former Premier's Office, Sydney. His office was also responsible for the public decorations during the Federation celebrations of 1901.

in 1906, he advocated Mahkoolma, near the future site of Lake Burrinjuck, as the site of Australia's new national capital.

He retired as New South Wales Government Architect in 1911 and returned to private practice, establishing a partnership with Howard Joseland. The latter, also born in England, was a practitioner of the Federation Arts and Crafts and Federation Bungalow styles. One of the buildings designed by Vernon and Joseland was the Paterson Reid and Bruce building, York Street, Sydney. In 1911, Vernon judged the competition entries for Parliament House in Wellington, New Zealand, after the original buildings were destroyed in a 1907 fire.

== Death and funeral ==
Following the amputation of a leg, Vernon died of septicaemia and gangrene on 17 January 1914 in Darlinghurst and his "impressive funeral" at St James' Church, Sydney on 19 January was attended by "a large and representative gathering of mourners". He is buried in the Anglican section of the Gore Hill Cemetery.

== Legacy ==
Vernon had an outstanding career as an architect, with many of his buildings being listed on various national and/or state heritage registers. He is known as a key practitioner of various Federation styles. The Vernon lectures in town planning, instituted at the University of Sydney in 1916, were endowed in his honour. Vernon Circle in Canberra is named in his honour, as is the Vernon Pavilion in Sydney's Centennial Park.

=== Partial list of works ===
The following buildings and structures were designed either in part or in full by Vernon, that are listed on active Commonwealth or State heritage registers include:

Work	Suburb/city	Type	Style	Completed	Involvement	Image	Heritage registers	Notes
Admiralty House	Kirribilli	Government residence	Victorian Italianate	1891–92	Italianate enlargements		Commonwealth Heritage List; (Now defunct) Register of the National Estate (RNE)	
Annandale Post Office	Annandale	Post office	Federation Free Classical	1896	Architect		Commonwealth Heritage List; Local register; (Now defunct) RNE	
Armidale Post Office	Armidale	Post office	Federation Queen Anne	1897	Loggia only		NSW Register; (Now defunct) RNE	
Art Gallery of New South Wales	The Domain, Sydney	Art gallery	Federation Academic Classical	1895–1906	Portico and oval lobby; South and north galleries; External reliefs		Local register; (Now defunct) RNE	
ASN Co building	1–5 Hickson Road, The Rocks	Warehouse	Pre-Federation Anglo Dutch	1884–1885	William Wardell (principal); Co-architect		NSW Register; (Now defunct) RNE	
Australian Museum	College Street, Sydney	Natural history museum		1896–1899	South wings		NSW Register; (Now defunct) RNE	
Banco Road Court	St James Road, Sydney	Court house	Federation Free Classical	1895–1896	Architect		NSW Register; (Now defunct) RNE	
Bloomfield Hospital	Orange	Hospital		1923–1931	Initial design only		NSW Register	
Broken Hill Post Office	Broken Hill	Post office	Federation Arts and Crafts	1890–1892	Alterations and additions		Commonwealth Heritage List; NSW Register; (Now defunct) RNE	
Brooklyn Hotel (Façade preserved as the Johnson's Building)	229 George Street, The Rocks	Public hotel	Free Federation Style	1912-1912	Architect		NSW Register; (Now defunct) RNE	
Burwood Post Office (former)	Burwood	Post office	Federation Anglo Dutch Revival	1892	Architect (assisted by George Oakeshott)		NSW Register; (Now defunct) RNE	
Casino Post Office	Casino	Post office	Victorian Italianate; Georgian Revival	1879	Alterations and additions		Commonwealth Heritage List; NSW Register; (Now defunct) RNE	
Central Local Court House	98 Liverpool Street, Sydney	Court house (and former police station)	Federation Free Classical	1892	Designed by James Barnet; Vernon supervised construction		NSW Register; (Now defunct) RNE	
Central railway station	Railway Square	Terminus railway station	Federation Free Classical; Beaux Arts style	1901–1906	Main Terminus building; Parcels Post Office; Viaducts (with Deane)		(Now defunct) RNE; Local register	
Colonial Secretary's building	121 Macquarie Street, Sydney	Government administration	Victorian Second Empire	1894–1896	Level 5; Mansard and dome		NSW Register; (Now defunct) RNE	
Coroner's Court (former)	102–104 George Street, The Rocks	Coroner's Court and morgue	Federation Free Style	1906–1908	Architect		NSW Register; (Now defunct) RNE	
Kitchen block, Cumberland Hospital and Parramatta Female Factory (former)	Parramatta/Westmead	Hospital	Federation; Federation Arts and Crafts	1892–1893	Alterations and additions		Australian National Heritage List; NSW Register; (Now defunct) RNE	
Customs House	Alfred Street, Sydney	Customs house		1896–1903	Alterations and additions		Commonwealth Heritage List; NSW Register; (Now defunct) RNE	
David Berry Hospital Precinct	Berry	Hospital		1909	Co-architect; with Howard Joseland		NSW Register	
Glen Innes Post Office	Glen Innes	Post office	Federation Arts and Crafts	1895–1896	Architect		Commonwealth Heritage List; NSW Register; (Now defunct) RNE	
Health Department Building (former)	93–97 Macquarie Street, Sydney	Government administration (now a hotel)	Federation Free Style	1896–1898	Architect		NSW Register; (Now defunct) RNE	
Hestock	14 Crescent Street, Hunters Hill	House	Federation Arts & Crafts	1885	Architect		NSW Register; (Now defunct) RNE	
Inverell Post Office	Inverell	Post office	Federation Arts and Crafts	1904	Architect		Commonwealth Heritage List; NSW Register	
Leura (now part of Cranbrook School, Sydney)	24 Victoria Road, Bellevue Hill	House	Federation Queen Anne	1891	Co-architect; with Howard Joseland		NSW Register	
Lidcombe Hospital Precinct	Lidcombe	Hospital		1885–1906	Dining Hall; Superintendent's Residence; Nine wards		NSW Register; (Now defunct) RNE	
Liverpool TAFE College (former Liverpool Hospital, Block F)	Liverpool	Teacher's college		1902–1907	Alterations and additions		NSW Register; (Now defunct) RNE	
Long Bay Correctional Centre	Malabar	Gaol		1899–1914	Architect		NSW Register	
Maitland Court House	Maitland	Court house	Federation Free Classical	1895	Architect		NSW Register; (Now defunct) RNE	
Millers Point Post Office	Millers Point	Post office	Federation Free Classical	1891	Architect		NSW Register; (Now defunct) RNE	
Mining Museum (former)	36–64 George Street, The Rocks	Museum	Federation Warehouse	1902–1909	Architect		NSW Register	
Mitchell Library, State Library of NSW	Sydney	Library	Federation Academic Classical	1906–1910	Architect		NSW Register; (Now defunct) RNE	
Mudgee Post Office	Mudgee	Post office	Victorian Free Classical	1902	Alterations and additions		Commonwealth Heritage List; NSW Register; (Now defunct) RNE	
Newcastle Court House	Newcastle	Court house	Victorian Italianate	1902	Alterations and additions		NSW Register; (Now defunct) RNE	
Newcastle Customs House	Newcastle	Customs house	Italian Renaissance Revival	1899	Alterations and additions		NSW Register; (Now defunct) RNE	
Newcastle Post Office	Newcastle	Post office	Federation Academic Classical	1900–1903	Architect		Commonwealth Heritage List; NSW Register; (Now defunct) RNE	
Paddington Post Office	Paddington	Post office	Victorian Italianate; Victorian Free Classical	c. 1885	Alterations and additions		Commonwealth Heritage List; NSW Register; (Now defunct) RNE	
Parkes Post Office	Parkes	Post office		1901–1903	Alterations and additions		NSW Register; (Now defunct) RNE	
Pyrmont Post Office	Pyrmont	Post office	Federation Free Style	1901	Architect		Commonwealth Heritage List; NSW Register; (Now defunct) RNE	
Randwick Post Office (former) and Jubilee Fountain	Randwick	Post office	Federation Free Style	1897–1898	Architect		NSW Register; (Now defunct) RNE	
Registrar-General's Building (also called the Land Titles Office)	Prince Albert Road, Sydney	Government administration	Federation Gothic	1908–1913	Principal architect (with E. H. Farmer)		NSW Register; (Now defunct) RNE	
Royal Botanic Gardens; Herbarium and Shelter House	The Domain	Herbarium and cottage		1899	Herbarium; Lecture hall and library; Museum and admin centre		NSW Register; (Now defunct) RNE	
Royal Edward Victualling Yard Group	Darling Island, Pyrmont	Naval warehouse and ordinance stores (former)	Federation Warehouse	1904–1912	Architect (Buildings A, B and C)		NSW Register; (Now defunct) RNE	
Shop and Residence	182 Cumberland Street, The Rocks	Shop and residence	Classic Free Style Edwardian	1911–1912	Architect (assisted by E. L. Drew)		NSW Register	
Silverwater Correctional Complex, Erwin House and Engineer's Cottage	Silverwater	Gaol		1911–1918	Alterations and additions		NSW Register	
Singleton Post Office (former)	Singleton	Former post office		1899	Alterations and additions		NSW Register; (Now defunct) RNE	
State Abattoir, Administration Buildings	Homebush Bay / Sydney Olympic Park	Former offices		1915	Architect (assisted by Principal Assistant Architect George McRae)			
Treasury Building (former) now part of the InterContinental Hotel	117–119 Macquarie Street, Sydney	Government administration	Victorian Neo-Classical; Italian Palazzo	1898–1900	Strong Room; Link Building; Portico		NSW Register; (Now defunct) RNE	

Other places where Vernon had involvement, either in part or in full, that are not listed on active Commonwealth or State heritage registers include:

- the Anderson Stuart building, The University of Sydney
- the former Balranald Post Office (since demolished)
- Bowral Court House
- the former Braidwood Courthouse
- Charles Sturt University, Original Farm and Farm School Buildings, Bathurst
- Cootamundra Court House
- Condobolin Court House
- Cowra Court House
- Crows Nest Fire Station
- Darlinghurst Fire Station
- Darlinghurst Police Station (former)
- Dubbo Lands Board Office
- Forbes Lands Board Office
- Hay Court House
- Hay Lands Board Office
- Hunters Hill Post Office
- Kogarah Post Office (former)
- Lismore Post Office
- Narrandera Court House
- Newtown Post Office
- Orange Lands Board Office
- Parkes Court House
- Pyrmont Fire Station
- Randwick Police Station
- Redfern Court House
- Sargood & Co Warehouse (former)
- Summer Hill Post Office (former)
- Surry Hills Police Station (former)
- Wagga Wagga Court House
- Western Sydney University Stable Square, Richmond
- Wyalong Court House

== Gallery ==
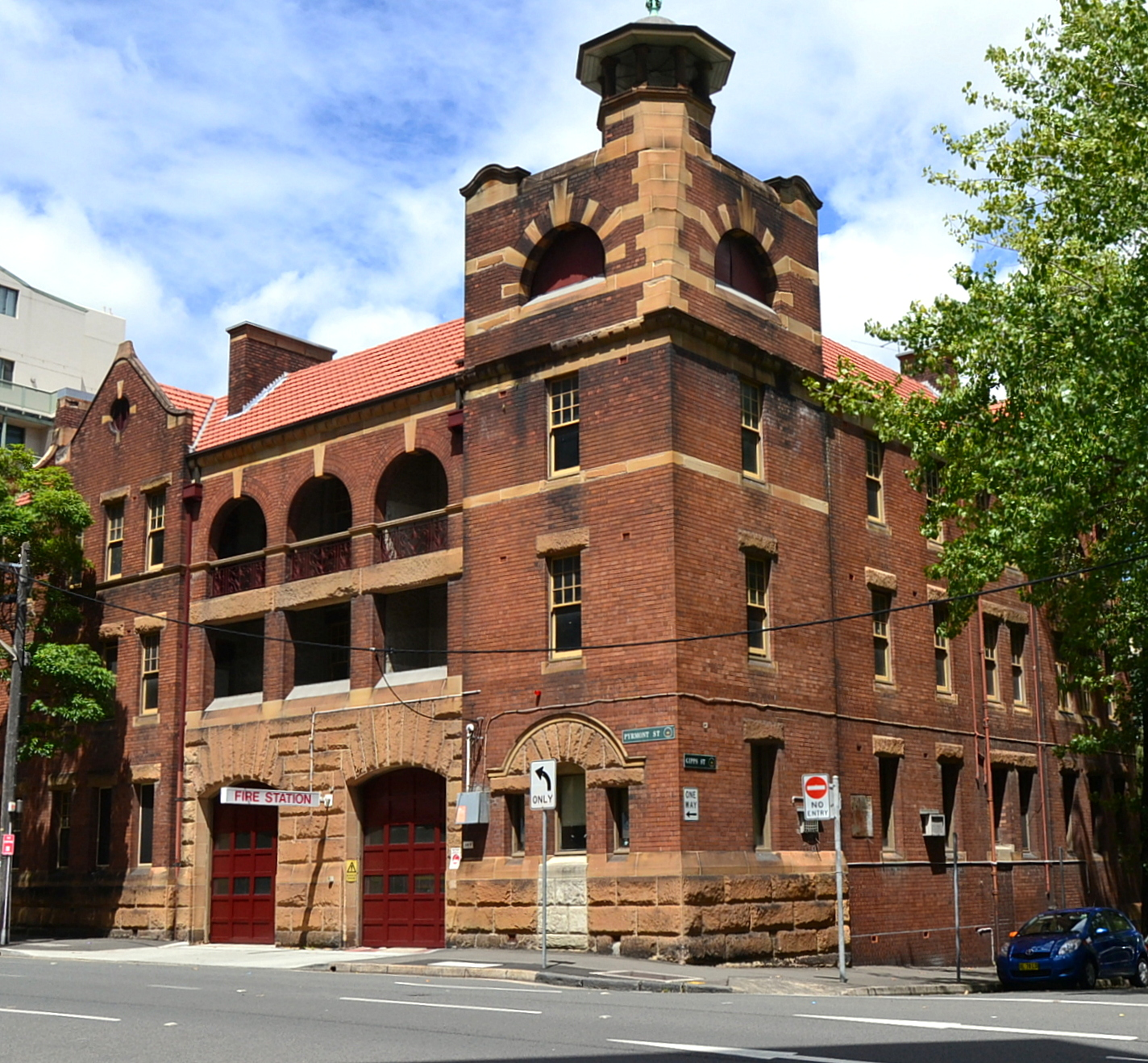
Pyrmont Fire Station

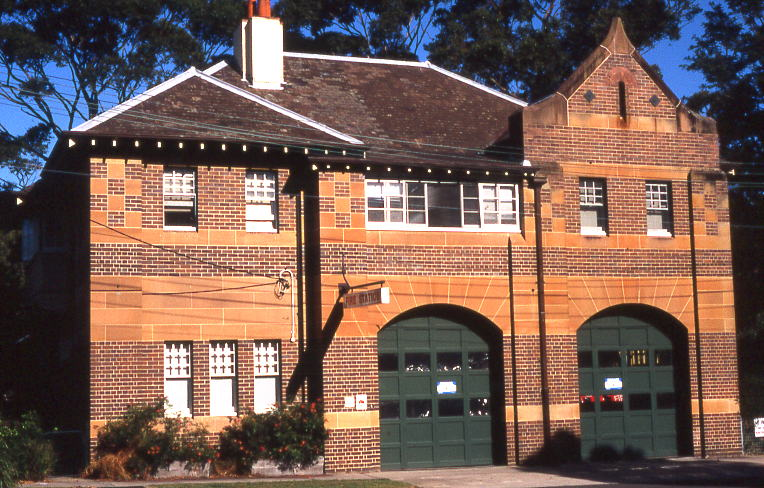
Randwick Fire Station

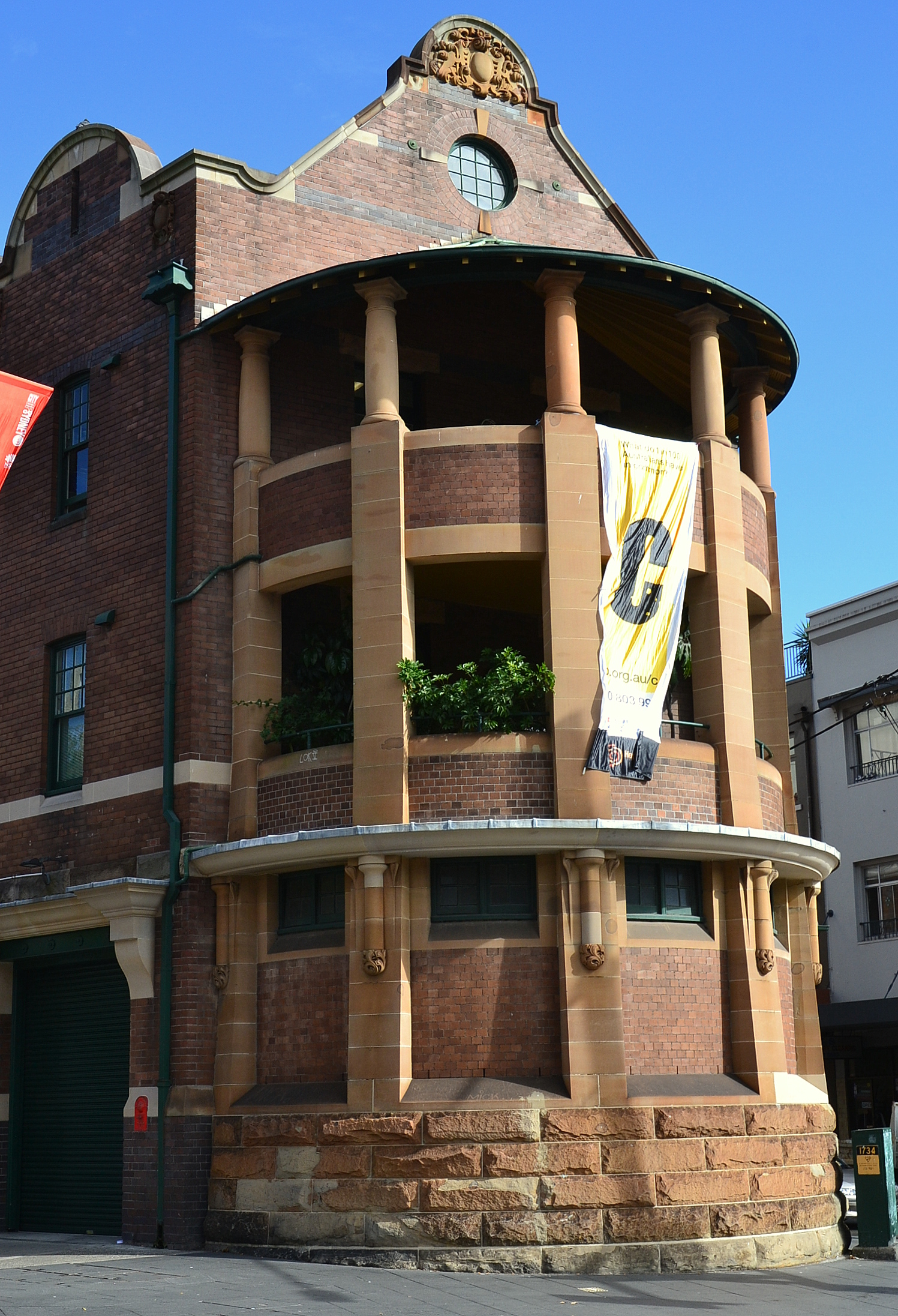
Darlinghurst Fire Station

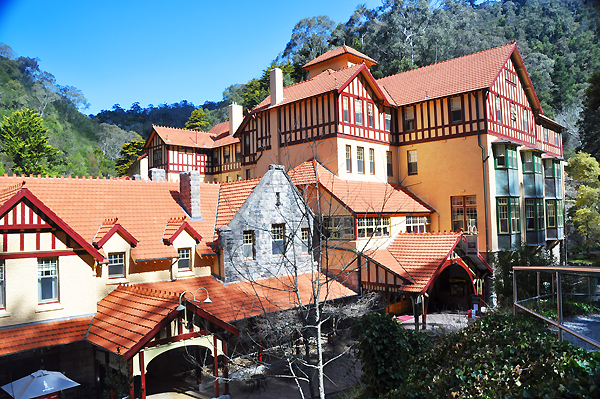
Jenolan Caves House, in the Blue Mountains

== See also ==
- Federation architecture
- New South Wales Government Architect
- Mahkoolma

Civic offices
Preceded by George Ranken	Mayor of East St Leonards; 1887–1888	Succeeded by Patrick William Glacken
Government offices
Preceded by James Barnet	New South Wales Government Architect; 1890–1911	Succeeded by George McRae
Military offices
Preceded by Lieutenant Colonel James Burns	Commanding Officer of the New South Wales Lancers; 1903–1906	Succeeded by Lieutenant Colonel; Charles Frederick Cox
