= Newcastle Court House =

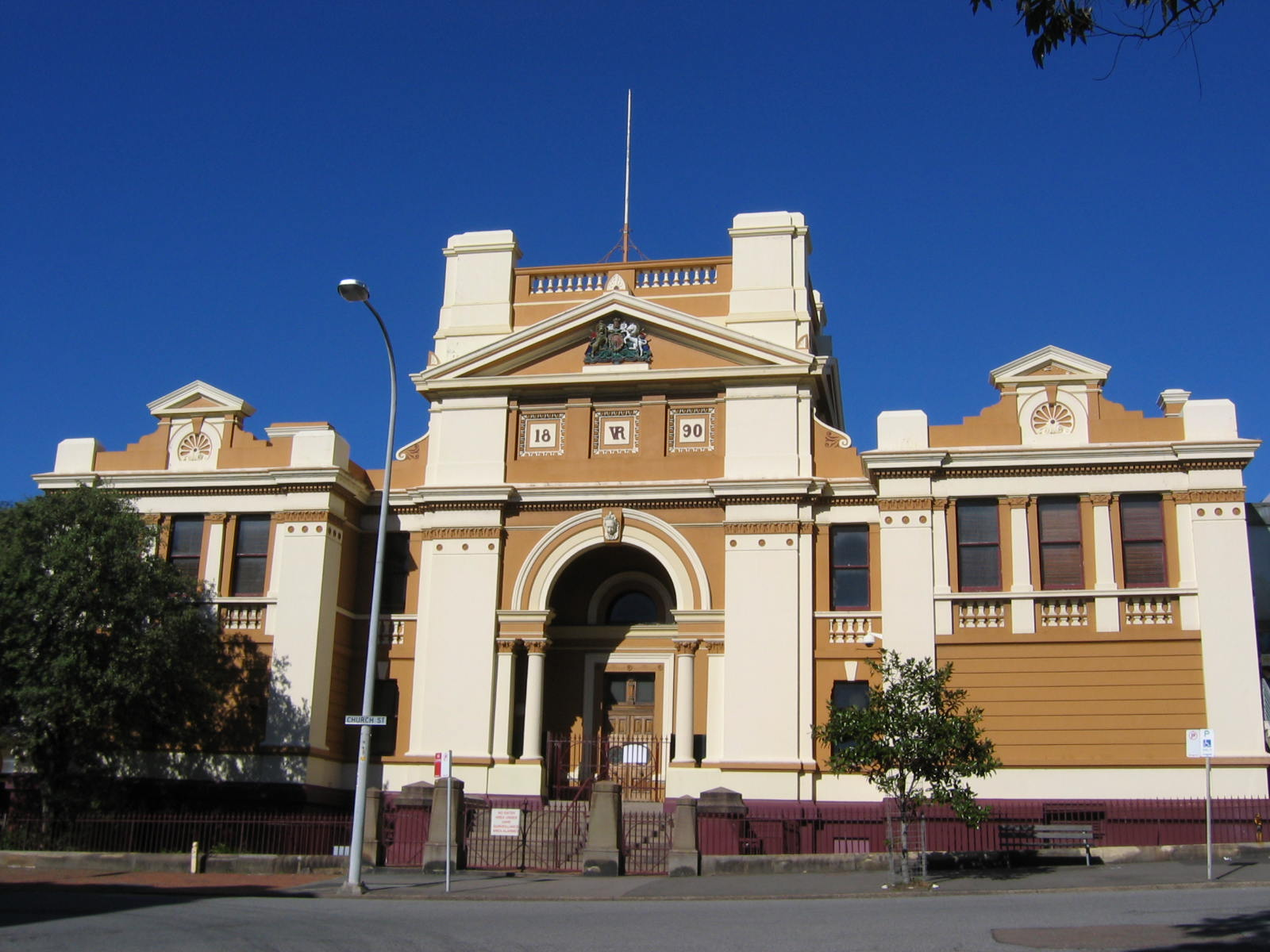

- Location within New South Wales

General information
- Status: Completed
- Type: Former court house; university campus
- Architectural style: Victorian Italianate
- Location: 9 Church Street, Newcastle, New South Wales, Australia
- Coordinates: 32°55′49″S 151°46′56″E
- Construction started: 1890
- Completed: 1892
- Cost: A£14,798
- Owner: Nihon University

Technical details
- Material: External brickwork; internal timber joinery; slate roof
- Floor area: 5,181 square metres (55,770 sq ft)

Design and construction
- Architects: James Barnet (designer); Walter Liberty Vernon (supervised construction)
- Architecture firm: Colonial Architect of New South Wales
- Main contractor: C. Coghill

New South Wales Heritage Register
- Official name: Newcastle Court House
- Type: Built
- Designated: 2 April 1999
- Reference no.: 00796

The Newcastle Court House is a heritage-listed former court house located at 9 Church Street, Newcastle, City of Newcastle, New South Wales, Australia. It is now owned by Nihon University. It was added to the New South Wales State Heritage Register on 2 April 1999.

== History ==
The Newcastle Court House was designed by the Colonial Architect, James Barnet, and construction was supervised by his successor, Walter Liberty Vernon. The Court House was constructed by the contractor C. Coghill and completed in 1892 at a cost of £14,798/12/2 pounds. This building replaced an earlier Court House built in 1841 which after several additions had outgrown its usefulness.

The building was used as a court house from 1892 until February 2016 when a new court house building was completed in Newcastle's Civic Place. In December 2016 the former court house building was sold for A$6.6 million and was converted in an offshore campus for the Nihon University of Japan.

== Description ==
The Newcastle Court House is a Victorian Italianate building that provides a terminating focal point to Bolton Street. The design is symmetrical, comprising a large arched tower entrance to the central Court Room with a recessed portico decorated with classically derived moulded details. This building is flanked on either side with single storey wing buildings, which also have decorative mouldings with raised pediments and pilasters dividing the window openings.

The Newcastle Court House is constructed in rendered brick with applied cement moulded details.

The court house of 1890–1892 was extended to the east for offices and court rooms. Two trial courts were later added to the west of the building. There were extensive alterations and additions carried out to the 1892 and the 1949 buildings in 1982.

Repairs following the 1989 Newcastle earthquake were undertaken in 1991.

It was reported to be in good condition as at 30 October 2000.

== Heritage listing ==
The Newcastle Court House is a fine and impressive building sited prominently in Bolton Street, Newcastle. Designed in the Victorian Italianate style it remains substantially intact and a grand example of late 19th century civic architecture within the town. The building has a lengthy association with the provision of justice in the district.

Newcastle Court House was listed on the New South Wales State Heritage Register on 2 April 1999.

== See also ==
- Australian non-residential architectural styles
