= Hilda Hope McMaugh =

Australian nurse and pilot (1885–1980)

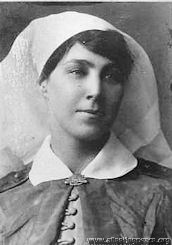
- Hilda Hope McMaugh (1919)
- Born: Caroline Hilda Hope McMaugh; 11 March 1885; Kempsey, New South Wales
- Died: 30 March 1981 (aged 96); Uralla, New South Wales
- Occupation: Nurse
- Years active: 1916–1950
- Known for: First Australian woman to gain a pilot's licence; Founding St Elmo's Private Hospital
- Aviation career
- First flight: October 1919
- Famous flights: Test flight 15 November 1919
- Flight license: 15 November 1919; Northolt Aerodrome

Hilda Hope McMaugh (11 March 1885 – 30 March 1981) was an Australian nurse and pilot. She was the first Australian woman to qualify as a pilot, receiving her certificate from the Royal Aero Club in England on 15 November 1919.

After completing her nursing training at Tamworth District Hospital, McMaugh enlisted with the Australian Army Nursing Service (AANS) in 1916. The following year she was posted to Cairo with the Australian Imperial Force (AIF). For her services during the First World War, she received the British War Medal and the Victory Medal.

After Armistice McMaugh went to London, where she earned a driving licence from Britain's Royal Automobile Club, and then after one month's training in a Centaur IV aircraft at Northolt Aerodrome, she gained a pilot's licence.

In 1920, McMaugh returned to her home town Uralla, in New South Wales. There, three years later, she established St Elmo's Private Hospital, where she ran the place as its matron for nearly 30 years. Her name is one of 850 inscribed on a memorial in Central Park, Armidale. A retirement home, the McMaugh Gardens Retirement Home, is named after her.

== Early life ==
Hilda McMaugh was born Caroline Hilda Hope on 11 March 1885 at Kempsey, in New South Wales, Australia, the youngest of two daughters of George McMaugh and his wife Clementina Sarah (Daisy) née Ker. At home she was affectionately known as Cissy.

After completing her nursing training at Tamworth District Hospital, McMaugh enlisted with the AANS on 26 August 1916. She served first at the Army hospital in Sydney, and the following year was posted to Cairo with the AIF. She left Australia on 21 March 1917 on the TSS Kanowna to serve at the 14th Australian General Hospital in Abbassia. After Armistice, she visited Jerusalem, Belgium, and France. For her services during the war she received the British War Medal and the Victory Medal.

== Life in England ==
In 1919, McMaugh was posted to England, where she took driving lessons, and received a licence from Britain's Royal Automobile Club. She also took flying lessons in a Centaur IV aircraft at the Central Aircraft Company's base at Northolt Aerodrome. On 15 November 1919, one month into flight training, McMaugh became the first Australian woman to qualify as a pilot, receiving her certificate, No. 7818, from the Royal Aero Club in England. That day, one newspaper described weather conditions as a "wild nasty day", the test took five hours, and she "didn't care a rap for the weather, and descended a winner in the midst of a shower of congratulatory cheers from her fellow-students — all men except her." On 16 November 1919, the Sunday Times reported:

Miss McMaugh, an Australian lady, after only a month's training, successfully passed her tests yesterday and received the Royal Aero Club's Pilot Certificate. She flew a Centaur 4 machine.

At the time she was reported to claim that she found flying aircraft easier than driving a car, explaining that "there are no bobbies and no crowds up there". Newspapers reported that she could loop-the-loop, and that during the final test she "felt like a bird". She described herself as having "mastered the levers".

== Later life ==
McMaugh returned to Australia on 12 January 1920. Her appointment with the Australian Army Nursing Service ended on 16 March 1920. Women were not permitted to hold a pilot's licence in Australia, and McMaugh was not allowed to fly there. In 1923, back in her home town Uralla, New South Wales, she bought an old school building and in it established a private hospital, St Elmo's. That year, it was opened by General Cox, who had known McMaugh from army service.

In later years she financed a pool for the hospital, built by local men who had lost income as a result of the Great Depression. She may have received money from a bet on Old Rowley, a racehorse who won the Melbourne Cup. She retired in 1950, having run the hospital as its matron for nearly 30 years. The hospital was sold to W. L. Colen and Ted Spensley, and converted into a hotel, before later being turned into residential property.

== Death and legacy ==
McMaugh died in Uralla on 30 March 1981. Her name is one of 850 inscribed on the Armidale Memorial Fountain, in Central Park, Armidale. A retirement home, the McMaugh Gardens Retirement Home, is named after her.
