= William Gilbert Gosling =

Mayor of St. John's, Newfoundland, Canada from 1916 to 1920

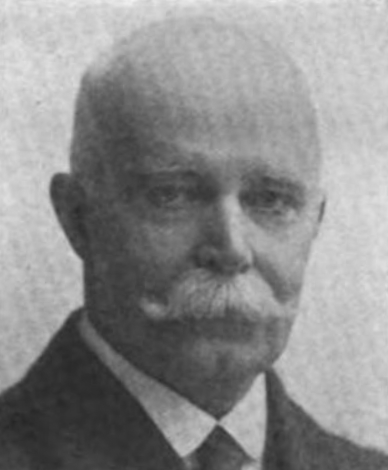
- Gosling in 1922

4th Mayor of St. John's, Newfoundland
- In office June 29, 1916 – December 15, 1921
- Preceded by: William Ellis
- Succeeded by: Tasker Cook

Chairman of the Municipal Commission of St. John's, Newfoundland
- In office July 2, 1914 – June 29, 1916
- Preceded by: Position established
- Succeeded by: Himself (as Mayor)

Personal details
- Born: September 8, 1863 Paget Parish, Bermuda
- Died: November 5, 1930 (aged 67) Bermuda
- Spouse: Armine Nutting Gosling
- Children: 6
- Relatives: Denis Keegan (grandson); Mary Adelaide Nutting (sister-in-law)
- Occupation: Businessman, writer

William Gilbert Gosling (September 8, 1863 – November 5, 1930) was a politician, businessman and author. From 1916 to 1920, he served as the mayor of St. John's, Newfoundland.

== Early life ==
William Gilbert Gosling was born in Paget Parish, Bermuda to Charles Gray Gosling and Elizabeth Gilbert. The second of their six sons, Gosling attended Pembroke Grammar School in Hamilton, Bermuda. On June 22, 1881, he moved to St. John's, Newfoundland (now a province of Canada) to work as a clerk for the fish exporting firm Harvey and Company. Taking charge of the wholesale side of the business, Gosling was described as having a "marked aptitude" for the job.

Shortly after arriving in Newfoundland, Gosling met his future wife Armine, the headmistress of the Church of England Girls' School in St. John's. In his spare time, Gosling became invested in reading, and in 1899 published his first literary work, an article about the William Shakespeare work The Tempest in the London periodical Literature. The nine guineas earned for the publication of his piece were reinvested in his ever-growing collection of books.

In 1906, Gosling helped to revive the Newfoundland Historical Society with fellow author Daniel Woodley Prowse. Around this time, Gosling became involved in historical writing when Wilfred Grenfell asked him to contribute a chapter on the history of Labrador to his book on his experiences as a Labrador physician. In 1910, this chapter was expanded into a published book, "Labrador: its discovery, exploration, and development", which remains an authoritative source on the subject today. The next year, a book on the life of Humphrey Gilbert, written by Gosling, appeared in London bookstores.

In 1909, Gosling became the organizing secretary for the newly formed Newfoundland Board of Trade, and became president of the Board in 1913. The same year, he became a director at Harvey and Company. He argued against Newfoundland's confederation with Canada, saying that to tie down trade relations with Canada only would reduce Newfoundland's ability to use its income to acquire the cheapest resources possible, in whichever country they may be found.

== Political career ==
Prior to his entry into municipal politics, Gosling led a fundraising effort to rebuild an Anglican cathedral which had been destroyed by fire, and in 1908 became the vice-president of the newly founded Association for the Prevention of Consumption. In 1914, the Newfoundland legislature replaced the local elected council in St. John's with an appointed commission consisting of twelve men. Governing the city for two years, the commission, of which Gosling was chairman, instituted a range of reforms, including a reorganization of water and sewage services and a new method of collecting and spending revenue. One such revenue reform included instigating legal proceedings against tax evaders who refused to pay after August 1, 1914. The commission also drafted a new municipal charter, which gave the local council more powers. However, the legislature rejected the draft, and restored the elected council.

In June 1916, a local election was held, and the electors of St. John's returned Gosling as their mayor. In 1920, another appointed commission replaced the elected council, governing the city until the revised town charter became law. Gosling's health deteriorated due to the stress of public life, and in 1921 declined to stand for re-election to the mayoralty.

== Later life ==
In September 1927, William Gosling and his wife Armine returned to Bermuda, where he died three years later at the age of 67. His wife later donated his large collection of books to the people of St. John's to form the town's first public library, the Gosling Memorial Library.
