= Central Centaur IIA =

Centaur IIA
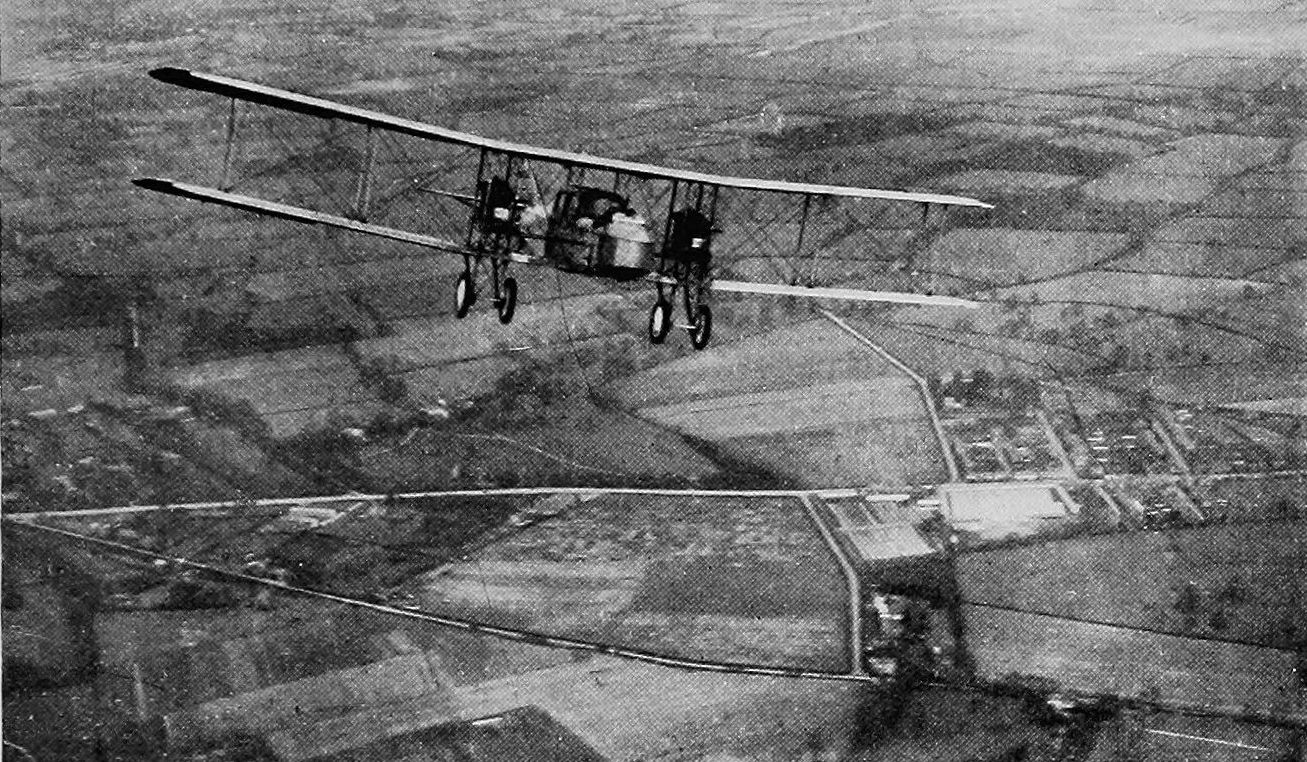
- A Centaur IIA flying over Northolt

General information
- Type: Biplane airliner
- Manufacturer: Central Aircraft Company Limited
- Designer: A A Fletcher
- Primary user: Central Aircraft Company Limited
- Number built: 2

History
- First flight: 1919

The Central Centaur IIA, a.k.a. Central C.F.2a, was a British civil six-passenger joyriding biplane aircraft produced by Central Aircraft Company Limited of London.

== Design and development ==
Following the success of the earlier Centaur IV for joyriding, A.A. Fletcher designed a larger twin-engined aircraft. Designated the Centaur IIB the first aircraft, registered G-EAHR, first flew during July 1919. The fuselage had an open cockpit for the two crew and six passengers. A second example, registered G-EAPC, was built. It had the same designation Centaur IIB but had an enclosed cabin for seven passengers. The second aircraft first flew in May 1920.

The second aircraft was tested by the Air Ministry in the 1920 Commercial Aeroplane Competition. It was described at the time as old-fashioned and low-powered, another problem was that loaded with all the fuel required for the three and half-hour test flight meant it was unable to carry passengers or pilots. The aircraft did not win the competition. The prototype was destroyed in an accident at Northolt Aerodrome in July 1919, shortly after the competition. The second aircraft crashed on the 25 September 1920 at Hayes, Middlesex, with a loss of six lives. No further examples were built.

== Aircraft ==
- Centaur IIA – G-EAHR – open cockpit version for six passengers, destroyed 1919.
- Centaur IIA – G-EAPC – enclosed cabin version for seven passengers, destroyed 1920.

== Operators ==
United Kingdom

- Central Aircraft Company Limited

== Specifications (Centaur IIA) ==
Data from , British Civil Aircraft since 1919 Volume 1

General characteristics

- Crew: 2
- Capacity: 6–9 pax
- Length: 39 ft 3 in (11.96 m)
- Wingspan: 63 ft 6 in (19.35 m)
- Width: 27 ft (8.2 m) wings folded
- Height: 12 ft 6 in (3.81 m)
- Empty weight: 3,850 lb (1,746 kg)
- Gross weight: 5,850 lb (2,654 kg)
- Max takeoff weight: 7,250 lb (3,289 kg)
- Powerplant: 2 × Beardmore 160 hp 6-cyl. in-line piston engines, 160 hp (120 kW) each
- Propellers: 2-bladed wooden fixed pitch propellers

Performance

- Maximum speed: 90 mph (140 km/h, 78 kn)
- Stall speed: 40 mph (64 km/h, 35 kn)
- Wing loading: 6.6 lb/sq ft (32 kg/m^{2})
- Power/mass: 0.06 hp/lb (0.098 kW/kg)
- Fuel consumption: 25 imp gal/h (30 gal/h; 110 L/h)
- Oil consumption: 2 imp gal/h (2.4 gal/h; 9.1 L/h)
