= Women's suffrage in Newfoundland =

Suffrage movement in Newfoundland

Women in Newfoundland won the right to vote and run for political office in 1925. The first general election in which women were able to participate occurred in 1928. In that election, 90 per cent of eligible women voters cast ballots. In 1930, Lady Helena Squires became the first woman elected into the Newfoundland House of Assembly after winning a by-election.

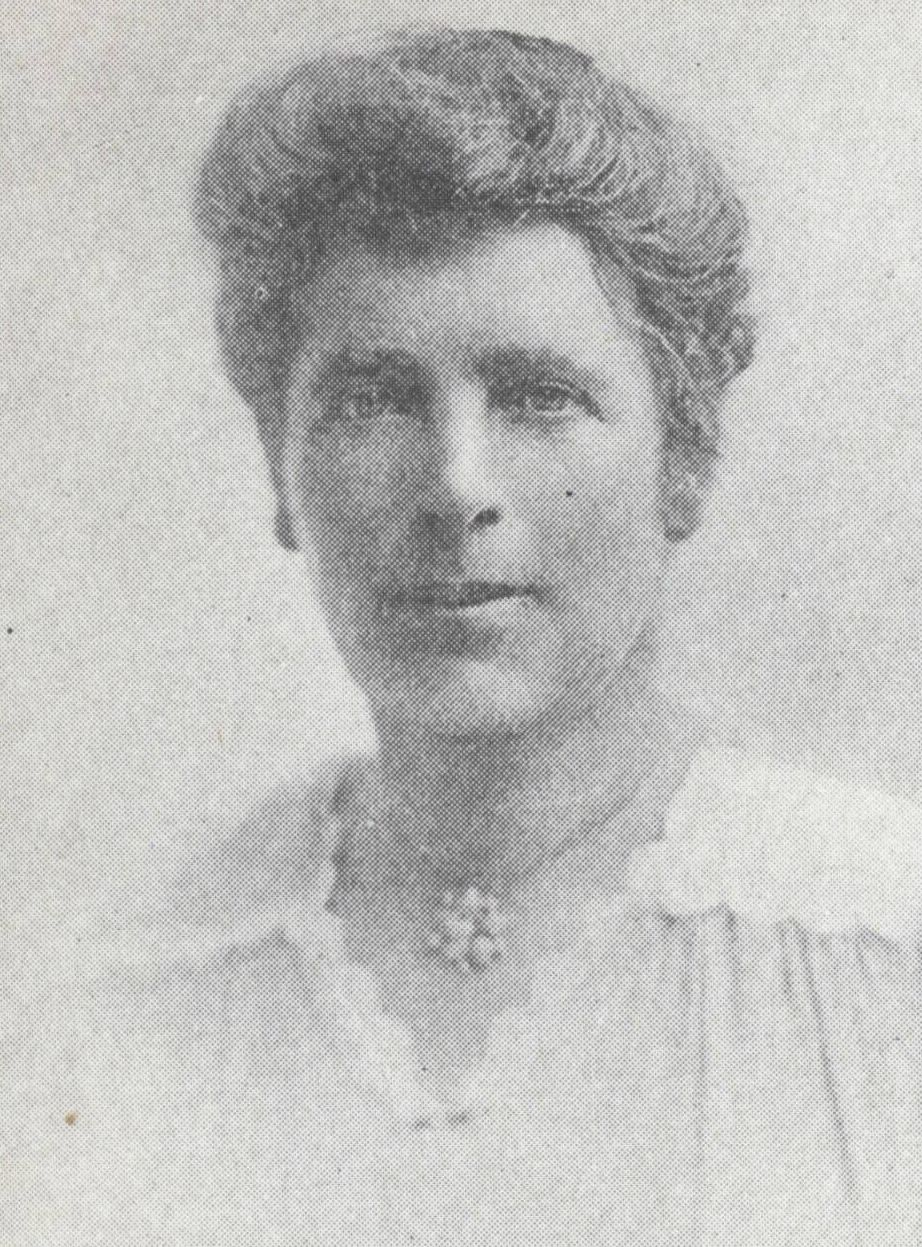
Adeline Browning was a leading suffragist in the Dominion of Newfoundland.

== The 1890s ==
The Newfoundland women’s suffrage movement began in the 1890s and was closely linked to the prohibition movement. In September 1890, a local branch of the Women’s Christian Temperance Union (WCTU) formed in St. John’s. WCTU members argued that alcohol abuse was a problem in the dominion, and that it led to increased rates of domestic violence and poverty, of which women and children were the primary victims. The WCTU argued that women should be given the right to vote in local option elections, so they could vote on prohibition and other issues.

To help promote its cause, the WCTU published a newsletter called the Water Lily. Edited by Jessie Ohman, it contained editorials and essays calling for women’s suffrage, as well as political cartoons skewering the Newfoundland government and Prime Minister Sir William Whiteway, who was seen as being weak on prohibition and women’s suffrage. The WCTU also circulated a petition across the island of Newfoundland, demanding the women be given the right to vote in local option elections. On March 18, 1891, WCTU members marched to the Colonial Building and gave the petition to the government. The Newfoundland legislature debated enfranchising women on March 15, 1892, but defeated the motion in a vote of 13 to ten. Another vote on May 4, 1893 was also unsuccessful, with 17 votes against the suffrage bill and 14 in favor.

The WCTU then stopped advocating for suffrage and turned its attention to missionary and charitable work.

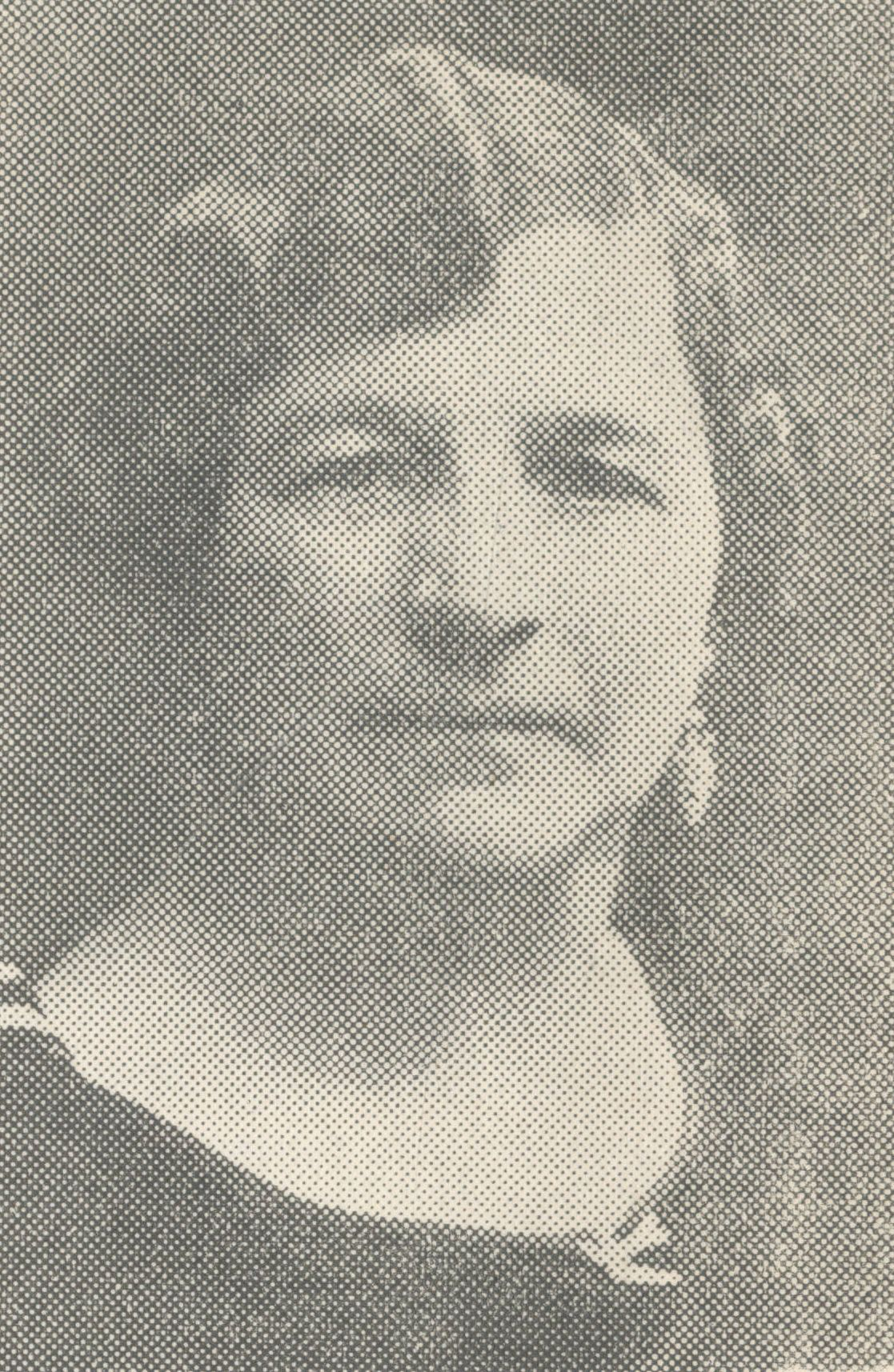
Julia Salter Earle (1878-1945) was a labour leader and social activist from the Dominion of Newfoundland. She was one of the first women to run for political office in Newfoundland.

== Second Wave of the Suffrage Movement ==
Although the WCTU was no longer fighting for women’s suffrage, the topic did not entirely disappear from the public consciousness. Suffragists were active in other parts of the world, and news of their work was reported in Newfoundland newspapers and debated in local clubs and societies.

However, most clubs were fraternal and barred women. In response, a group of St. John’s women formed the Ladies Reading Room in 1909 to give women a space to discuss current affairs and read international journals and newspapers. The Reading Room also hosted a Current Events Club, which met every Saturday to debate current affairs, including suffrage. The Ladies Reading Room and Current Events Club politicized a new generation of suffragists. Its leaders included Armine Gosling, Fannie McNeil, Myra Campbell, Anna (Barnes) Mitchell, Agnes Miller Ayre, and Adeline Browning.

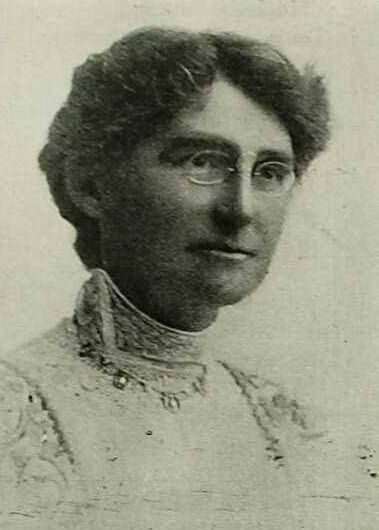
Armine Gosling Distaff was a leader of the Newfoundland suffrage movement.

The outbreak of the First World War caused suffragists to reduce their efforts, but, when the war ended, the movement gained significant ground. The war service of Newfoundland women helped the postwar suffragettes make their case that women deserved the vote. The Women's Patriotic Association (which was formed in 1914 to support the war effort) and its leaders were to key to the postwar proliferation of women's civic organizations, including the suffrage movement. In 1920, Armine Gosling, Adeline Browning, and Anna Mitchell founded the Newfoundland Women’s Franchise League. Browning was also London representative to the International Woman Suffrage Alliance. The Franchise League had one goal: to win voting rights for women. League members embarked on an island-wide publicity campaign: suffragists screened advertisements in movie houses, published essays and letters in newspapers, canvassed homes and businesses, and circulated a petition throughout the island to garner support. Their efforts ended in success on March 9, 1925, when Prime Minister Walter Stanley Monroe introduced a suffrage bill to the legislature. It passed unanimously and became law on April 3, 1925. It was not, however, a total success: women could become voters at the age of 25, while men could vote at the age of 21. Nonetheless, suffragists hailed the new law as a victory and the Women’s Franchise League changed its name to The League of Women Voters, a non-partisan organization that promoted such social issues as compulsory education, child welfare, and maternal health.
