= Armine Nutting Gosling =

Newfoundland suffragist

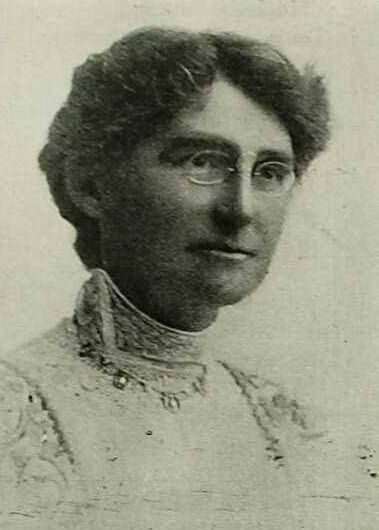
- Born: Harriet Armine Nutting; November 6, 1861; Waterloo, Canada East
- Died: December 15, 1942 (aged 81); Paget Parish, Bermuda
- Occupations: Educator, Suffragist
- Known for: Advocacy of women's suffrage, women's rights, child and animal welfare
- Spouse: William Gilbert Gosling (m. 1888; died 1930)
- Children: Ambrose Gosling; Armine Gosling jr. Francis Gosling; Arthur Gosling; Gilbert Gosling; Elizabeth Gosling
- Parent(s): Vespasian Nutting; Harriet (Peasley) Nutting
- Relatives: Mary Adelaide Nutting (sister)

Armine Nutting Gosling (November 6, 1861 – December 15, 1942) was a Canadian-born educator, suffragist, and social reformer who played a leading role in the women's rights movement in Newfoundland.

After serving as principal of the Church of England Girls’ School in St. John’s, she became deeply involved in public life through her advocacy for child and animal welfare, women’s education, and political equality. Gosling was a founding force behind the Ladies Reading Room and Current Events Club and later served as president of the Newfoundland Women’s Franchise League, spearheading the petition that led to women winning the right to vote in 1925. A gifted writer and speaker, Gosling’s influence extended beyond suffrage, laying groundwork for expanded civic engagement and social reform in Newfoundland. She is remembered as a pioneering voice for women’s rights and public service.

== Early life ==
Armine Nutting was born on November 6, 1861, in Waterloo, Canada East, to Vespasian and Harriet Sophia (Peasley) Nutting. Her father, a cobbler by trade, struggled to support the family as mass production of footwear made his work increasingly obsolete. He turned to alcohol, and this was devastating to the Nutting Family. Harriet, determined to secure a better future for her children, supported the household as a seamstress and prioritized their education, ensuring that Armine and her sister received lessons in elocution, music, and drawing alongside their academic studies.

Affectionally nicknamed “Minnie” in childhood, Armine was a gifted student with early ambitions to teach. She completed her education at Shefford Academy in Quebec. In 1881, believing that better opportunities lay outside of Waterloo for her children, Harriet, moved with Armine, her brother Jim, and sister Mary Adelaide Nutting to Ottawa. There, she rented a flat to support her children as they pursued education and career paths, while Vespasian remained in Waterloo with their eldest son’s family.

The move initially allowed Armine to continue her education, but within six months she applied for and accepted a position in St. John's, then part of the Colony of Newfoundland, as Headmistress of the Church of England Girls’ School (later known as Bishop Spencer College. She arrived to St. John's, Newfoundland, in January 1882 at the age of 21 to undertake her position as principal.

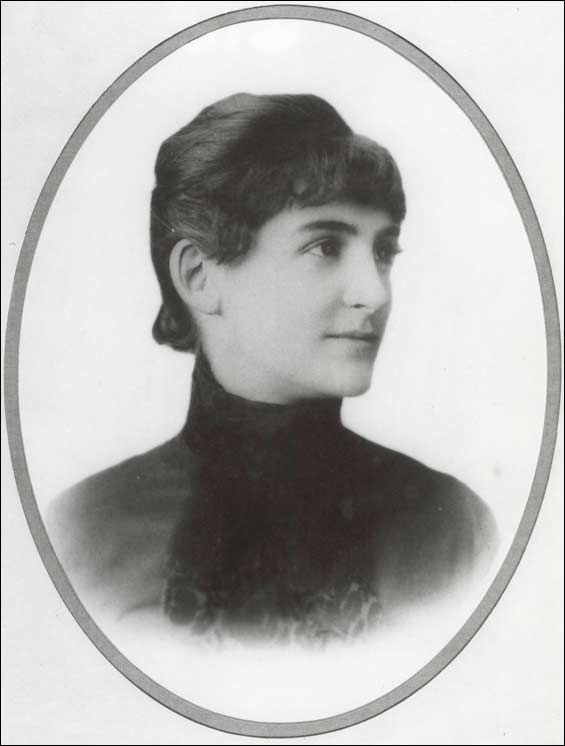
Armine Nutting during her tenure as principal of the Church of England Girls’ School, ca. 1882–1886.

While boarding at Ms. Coen's on Prescott Street in St. John’s, Nutting met William Gilbert Gosling, a fellow resident originally from Bermuda. The two became engaged in 1886 and married in 1888. Gilbert Gosling went on to become director of Harvey and Company in 1913 and served as mayor of St. John's from 1916 to 1920. Armine Gosling is well known in St. John's for her community work; she worked for the Society for the Protection of Animals, the Child Welfare Association, and in 1912, became the first woman to serve on the Council of Higher Education in Newfoundland.

== Women's rights movements and social activism ==
As Armine's contemporaries said of her, "Mrs.Gosling has always been a suffragist". The role her mother played in supporting their household had made a lasting impression on young Armine. As she grew older, she began to feel resentment towards the low value placed on women's work and the injustice it caused women.

Gosling is best remembered for her involvement in the Newfoundland suffrage movement. Her first direct involvement in women’s rights was shaped in part by a trip to England in 1904, where she brought her daughter, Armine Jr., to attend school. While there, she became acquainted with Lavinia Dock, a friend of her sister and a prominent suffragist. Gosling began attending suffrage meetings in London and subscribed to British suffrage newspapers.

Upon returning to Newfoundland, she became increasingly involved in social reform, supporting causes related to child and animal welfare, girls’ education, and women's rights. In 1909, some women had become accustomed to attending debates at fraternal society clubs. This was a major way women were privy to political issues and debates of the day. One debate concerning women's suffrage had prompted the women in the room to comment, and as a result women told to leave and banned from further entry to any fraternal society debates. As a direct result, Gosling opened her home to discuss next steps in founding a society solely for women. This informal gathering laid the groundwork for the founding of the Ladies Reading Room and Current Events Club in 1910 (Later the Old Colony Club), Newfoundland’s first space dedicated to political education and discussion for women. The organization quickly grew to 125 members in its first week and soon held one of the largest collections of periodicals in the country. Gosling delivered her first address to the club on the subject of women's suffrage in 1912, which was so well received that it was later published as a pamphlet. Ever successful in improving educational prospects, in 1912, Gosling became the first woman to serve on Newfoundland’s Council of Higher Education.

During the First World War, with her sons and daughter (Armine Jr.) serving overseas, Gosling took on a leadership role as the honorary secretary of the Women’s Patriotic Association (WPA). In this role, she helped coordinate communication among 219 WPA branches across the island, supporting war relief efforts. The Association’s work was widely recognized, both locally and abroad, including by Queen Mary who supported the movement and was actively involved in providing insight for future direction.

Following the war, Gosling became president of the Newfoundland Women’s Franchise League. Drawing on the networks established during her work with the WPA, she helped organize what became the largest petition campaign in Newfoundland up to that time. The petition, which called for women's suffrage, gathered over 20,000 signatures. Despite political resistance from some government figures, including Prime Minister Sir Richard Squires, the campaign ultimately led to legislative change. On April 3, 1925, Newfoundland women aged 25 and older were granted the right to vote. Men, by contrast, could vote at age 21. Armine, at this time was in Bermuda with her husband due to his ill health, but was nevertheless celebrated widely for her dedication and leadership of Women's Franchise back home in Newfoundland.

== Personal life ==
=== Early life and family ===
Known for her intellectual independence and sense of duty, Gosling’s personal life reflected the same values that shaped her public activism. Her childhood, particularly the role her mother held, was crucial to shaping her support of women's rights. Her family's financial situation also presented sad and bitter memories for her and her siblings. Considering her young age of 21, and lack of experience, the appointment as principal for the Church of England Girls School, considered by some to be Newfoundland's leading school for girls, was quite a daunting one. However, the salary of $600.00 per annum was attractive to Armine and became a way out of the financial difficulties at home.

Armine had a close relationship with her sister Adelaide, and asked her to come with her to St. John's to teach music. Adelaide accepted the offer: she taught music at the school but stayed for just one year. Their mother, Harriet, during this time, had taken seriously ill. Adelaide felt the desperate need to nurse their sick mother but lacked the necessary knowledge. After their mother died in 1884, Adelaide turned towards the nursing profession with great success. In 1907, becoming the first university professor of nursing in the world.

=== Marriage and motherhood ===
Shortly after arriving in St. John's Armine met William Gilbert Gosling who was born in Bermuda in 1863. In 1881 he had joined the staff of Harvey and Company, a St. John's wholesale provisions firm with strong ties to Bermuda. Armine and Gilbert, fellow boarders, first met in 1882 in the dining room at Mrs. Coen's boarding house in St. John's. The two reportedly developed a close bond after their first meeting. Armine and Gilbert were engaged in 1886, and Armine gave up her job as principal in order to prepare for marriage. Many friends considered their union a reckless choice, given the couple’s limited means and uncertain prospects, but both held strong faith in their ambitions for the future. In January 1886 she left St. John's and travelled to Bermuda, where she spent the winter of 1886-1887 with her future in-laws at the Gosling family home, Strawberry Hill.

On January 2, 1888 she and Gilbert were married. Following their wedding, the Goslings settled in St. John's. During the first portion of her married life, Armine led a conventional life as a homemaker and mother. They had six children: Ambrose (born in 1888), Armine (1891), Francis (1895), twins Arthur and Gilbert, (1901), and Elizabeth (1904). Both Gilbert Jr. and Elizabeth died in infancy, placing a shadow over the young couple's lives. Armine, much like her mother, sought determination from hardship. She became a staunch advocate for maternal and child welfare and, in 1897, fundraised enough money to create a new wing for the women and children at the General Hospital.

=== Later life and legacy ===
By the early 1900s, her husband's career had become a success. Gilbert served as director of Harvey and Company from 1913 until 1927 and was mayor of St. John's from 1916 to 1920. They established a comfortable life for themselves, and Armine began to address topics of women's rights and women's importance in Newfoundland society. The two were happily married for almost forty years. Due to Gilbert’s failing health, Armine spent winters in Bermuda beginning in 1921 and moved to Bermuda permanently with her husband in 1927.

Upon her husband's death in 1930, Armine returned one last time to Newfoundland in 1934. She donated over 4,000 of his books to the City of St. John’s. That final gift led to the founding of the Gosling Memorial Library in 1936, the first free public library in Newfoundland, which would go on to serve 400 towns and villages, and grew to have over half a million books borrowed per year.

In addition to her civic work, Gosling also contributed to the development of women’s sports in Newfoundland. In 1905 Gosling became the Vice-President of the new Ladies Avalon Curling Club. She was also an avid golfer and was elected Women's Captain at Bally Haly Golf Club in St. John's in 1912. After retiring to Bermuda, Armine won a women's golf championship at Riddell's Bay, at the age of 65.

Armine Gosling died in Bermuda in 1942 at the age of 81. Her contributions to social reform and women's rights in Newfoundland remain part of her lasting legacy.

== See also ==
- List of people of Newfoundland and Labrador
