= Margaret Davidson =

First Lady of New South Wales, activist (1871–1964)

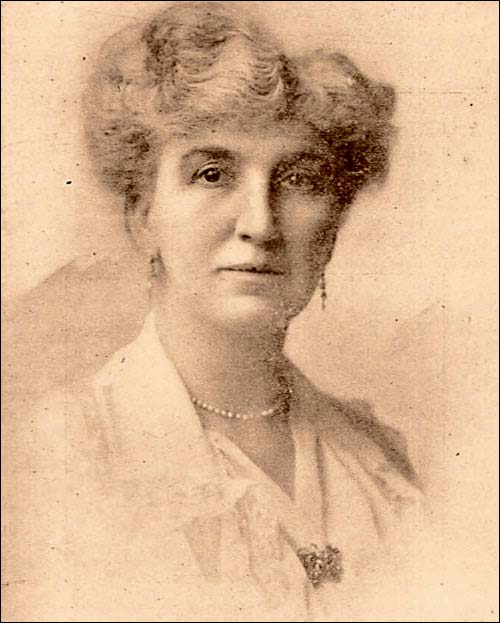

Dame Margaret Agnes Davidson, Lady Davidson DBE DStJ (née Feilding; 21 April 1871 – 14 October 1964) was the British wife of the Colonial Governor of New South Wales, Sir Walter Edward Davidson. She was named Dame Commander of the Order of the British Empire for her work with the Red Cross Society and the Scouting and Girl Guides in New South Wales.

== Background ==
Born Margaret Agnes Feilding, she was the daughter of General Hon. Sir Percy Robert Basil Feilding (1827–1904) and Lady Louisa Isabella Harriet Thynne (died 26 June 1919). She married Sir Walter Edward Davidson on 21 October 1907, and was thereafter styled as Lady Davidson. In 1918, Davidson was invested as a Dame Commander of the Order of the British Empire (DBE) in her own right, and later as a Dame of Grace, Order of St. John of Jerusalem. She was thereafter styled as Dame Margaret Davidson.

== Legacy ==
- Lady Davidson Hospital, Turramurra
- Lady Davidson Circuit, Forestville, New South Wales

== See also ==
- Scouting and Guiding in New South Wales
- Women's Patriotic Association

== Sources ==
- Charles Mosley, editor, Burke's Peerage, Baronetage & Knightage, 107th edition, 3 volumes (Wilmington, Delaware, U.S.: Burke's Peerage (Genealogical Books) Ltd, 2003), volume 1, page 1087.
