= Central Park, Armidale =

Park in New South Wales, Australia

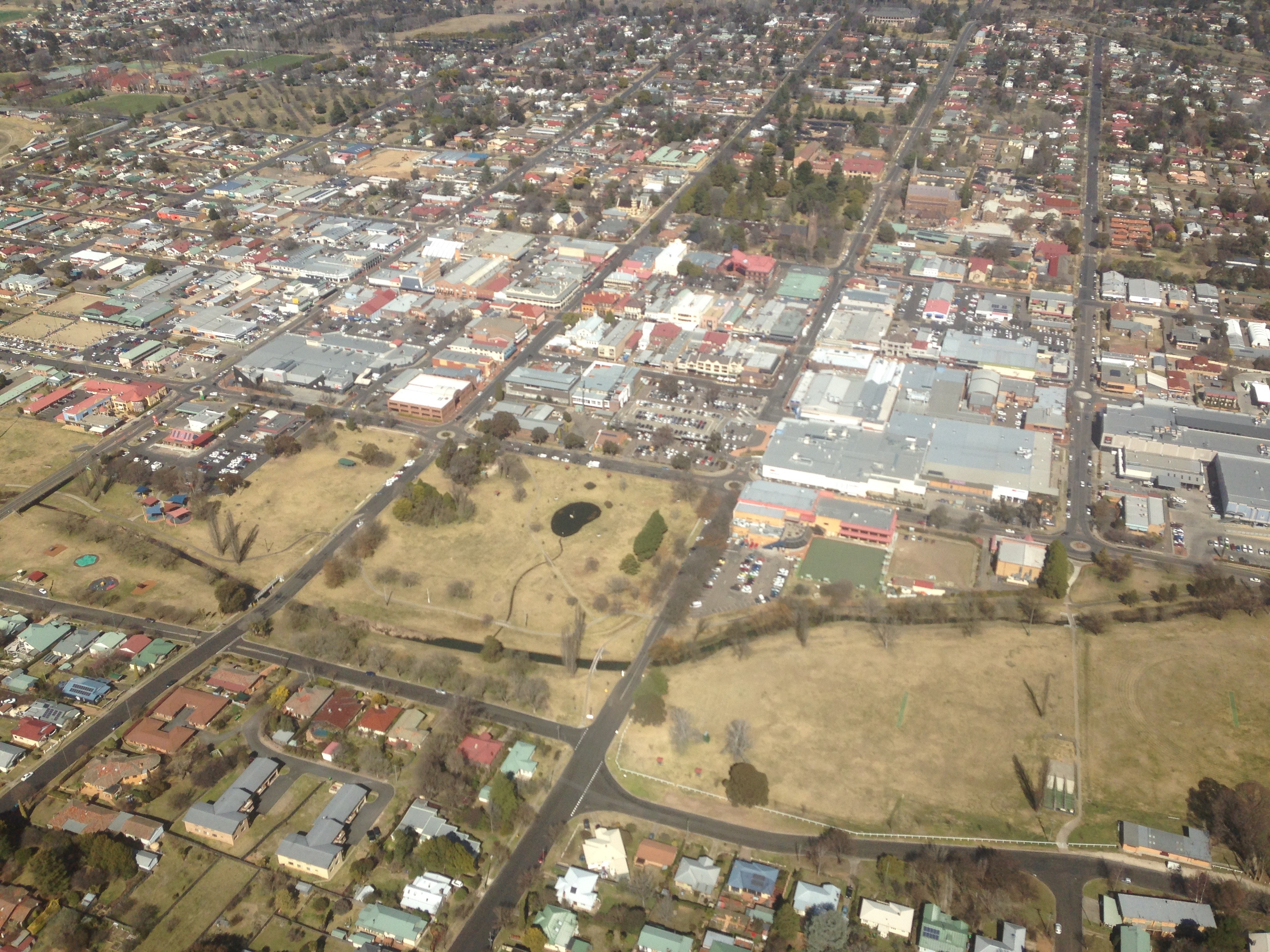
- An aerial view of Armidale, with Central Park located in the centre background

- Location within New South Wales
- Interactive map of Central Park, Armidale
- Type: Urban park
- Location: 125 Dangar Street, Armidale, Armidale Regional Council, New South Wales, Australia
- Coordinates: 30°30′58″S 151°39′55″E
- Created: 1874–1890
- Designer: Brother Francis Gatti; Armidale Council; W. H. See (rotunda)
- Operator: Armidale Regional Council
- Status: Open all year

New South Wales Heritage Register
- Official name: Central Park; Reserve No.8; Armidale Park
- Type: State heritage (landscape)
- Designated: 19 December 2018
- Reference no.: 2019
- Type: Urban Park
- Category: Parks, Gardens and Trees
- Builders: Richard Moffatt (rotunda)

Central Park is a heritage-listed public park at 125 Dangar Street, Armidale, in the New England region of New South Wales, Australia. It was designed by Brother Francis Gatti, the Armidale Council and W. H. See, who designed the rotunda. The park was built from 1874 to 1890 by Richard Moffatt. It is also known as Reserve No.8; Armidale Park. The park was added to the New South Wales State Heritage Register on 19 December 2018.

== History ==
=== Pre-and-post contact Aboriginal custodianship ===
Armidale lies within the traditional lands of the Anaiwan (also spelt as Anewan and Anaywan) people. European settlement began in the 1830s, leading to clashes with convicts assigned to landholders. Violence appears largely to have ceased after 1842. From the early 1850s many Aboriginal people of the New England region were forced onto reserves, and later onto missions.

=== The establishment and improvement of the park ===
==== Establishment ====
The Armidale town plan was developed in 1846 by surveyor John Valentine Gorman and revised in 1849 by surveyor John James Galloway. In accordance with the policy of Surveyor-General Sir Thomas Mitchell, it included four town reserves, one of which, Reserve No. 8, appears to have been intended as recreational space. Such spaces reflected a growing colonial interest in what was being achieved in the UK by the popular movement for the creation of public parks such as Joseph Paxton and Kemp's Birkenhead Park in Liverpool. Its aims were reflected in NSW by the Public Parks Act 1854 (NSW), which authorised the appointment of trustees to care for lands dedicated for public recreation, health and enjoyment. The creation of parks was further encouraged by the Crown Lands Alienation Act 1861 (NSW), which allowed the dedication of Crown land for this purpose.

Although Armidale was incorporated in 1863, it was not until 24 February 1874 that Armidale Municipal Council arranged for its dedication for public recreation. In this it will have been stimulated by an increasing fashion in NSW, as in the UK, for "breathing space" as town centres became built up. The site continued more or less in its natural state until the mid-1870s when it was cleared and fenced; some of this was performed by inmates of Armidale jail. While a sundial was installed in the centre and a cricket pitch was provided, residents grazed their stock in this otherwise-neglected "Dismal Park", as it was called by local wags. Such situations were far from uncommon in NSW, where the running of stock on reserves was winked at by people with the British village common still in mind. Public proclamation of the park was on 31 May 1887.

==== Consultancy by Charles Moore ====
This situation continued until 1878 when Charles Moore was consulted as to suitable plantings. Moore, who for over 48 years (1848–96) was Director of the Royal Botanic Garden, which under his supervision developed into its present form. As a horticulturist, landscape designer and plant and seed collector, Moore was without parallel in NSW. Moore founded the State Nursery, Campbelltown, and, through his supervisor of works, James Jones, influenced the landscapes of parks, court houses, police stations, schools, hospitals and railway station surrounds throughout NSW. His activities are said to have had a "subtle but indelible" influence on the face of NSW through the expectation that public property would be enhanced through suitable planted settings.

Moore carefully considered Armidale's specific requirements, and subsequently despatched from the State Nursery a case of suitable trees. These were planted, but soon died through neglect. Here things rested until 1879 when Samuel Purchase of the notable Somerset Nursery, Camellia, presented Council with thirty-six "very fine young trees". These were provided with timber enclosures to protect them from straying stock and malicious damage, and fencing was renewed to discourage straying stock. That Council's interest did not extend much beyond this is demonstrated by its failure to appoint trustees until 1882, perhaps stimulated by the availability from 1880 onward of government funds for municipalities.

==== Influence of Brother Francis Gatti ====
Here things rested until the arrival of help from a rather unlikely quarter. June 1882, when it was announced that Brother Francis Gatti (1833–1891, born Giulio Gatti at Iesi, Italy), a Capuchin Franciscan lay brother associated with the adjacent Roman Catholic Cathedral of St. Mary and St. Joseph, had "volunteered his services in looking after the plants and has been sent to Sydney to select 400 trees". Born in Gazi, Italy, Gatti went on to take part in Franciscan missionary work in South Wales with Elzear Torreggiani, who was subsequently created Bishop of Armidale, whence he and Gatti arrived in November 1879.

Gatti's farming background and love of plants equipped him for his labours, which with assistance from Council helped to transform the reserve into an attractive space. The reserve was further improved in July 1885, when gas lamps were installed in and around it, partly as a result of representations by Gatti, whose labours were supported by casual workers part-funded by the colonial government. He was a busy man, for he also maintained the Roman Catholic section of the Armidale cemetery, and also the grounds of the nearby Cathedral and Ursuline convent. Gatti campaigned against vandalism by "a wanton set of turbulent youths" who tore up many plants, and asked Council to prohibit public meetings within the park. His efforts with regard to both the park and the cathedral garden are said to have stimulated the development of public and private gardens of Armidale.

Gatti laid out the park, which by 1884 was established according to his design. The four corners were linked with diagonal gravel crossing paths, themselves linked by a circular path, defined by plantings, at their intersections. Slightly inset from the four sides of the park were paths forming a promenade; these were also defined by plantings to the extent that they were described as avenues. The grassy inner section featured grouped ornamental plantings. In 1884, too, commenced the Public Parks Act 1884 (NSW), which allowed Councils to be appointed as park trustees, cleverly devolving to them the associated costs and responsibilities.

After Gatti's death from influenza and bronchitis in November 1891 aged 58, it was proposed that a memorial to his life be constructed within the reserve; but in the event this took the form of a chapel, completed in 1892, near his grave in Armidale cemetery.

=== Central Park and its war memorials ===
By 1890 Reserve No. 8 had become known as Armidale Park, probably in recognition of its transformation into a desirable space; but by 1892 the title of Central Park (or 'The Central Park') had been settled upon to differentiate it from East End Park (now McDonald Park) and West End Park (now Lambert Park). The reserve had taken on the character of a town square, and became a favoured location for public gatherings and performances. This was encouraged by the progressive construction of ecclesiastical and other community buildings addressing the park. By late 1900 the local Fire Brigade and Citizen's Committee had decided to erect, at the intersection of the diagonal pathways, a band rotunda as a memorial to local South African (Boer) War volunteers. Council resolved to permit its erection, but insisted that it be erected not at the central crossing, but further south. A majority of the aldermen appear to have considered that the intersection should be reserved for a much more formal Council-sponsored monument.

As Ken Inglis has shown, in planning their memorials most Australian communities opted for pure monumentality, rather than practicality, on the grounds that such things should be elevated above the vernacular. In erecting a memorial rotunda, Armidale joined a select club including only Mudgee and Charters Towers. The rotunda was dedicated on St. Patrick's Day 1902 by Mrs Margaret White, wife of F. J. White of Saumarez, in a ceremony supported by both the public and the military, and specifically by the Irish National Association in conjunction with its annual rally. Designed by local architect William Henderson Lee and executed by Richard Moffatt, the structure was encircled by an ornamental fence of posts, twisted bars and chains.

In 1902 another memorial, consisting of a fountain on a plinth of simple pink granite, was dedicated in memory of William Murray, a highly esteemed local doctor and sometime Mayor. Murray was commemorated, also, by a fountain and horse trough outside the Court House.

In 1912 it was reported that dead trees had been replaced, the central area had been fenced, and seating had been installed. New gates were installed the following year.

With the conclusion of the Great War the Armidale and District Sailors' and Soldiers' Executive pressed for the erection within the park, which during the war had been the scene of many patriotic assemblies, of a memorial fountain bearing the names of local volunteers. The greater scale of impact of this secondwar was demonstrated by Council's approval of the siting of the fountain at the park's central crossing. Designed by L.C. McCredie, it was executed by W.G. Partridge under the supervision of R.N. Hickson, a local architect. The fountain, in grey granite, was dedicated by Governor Sir Walter Davidson on 21 October 1922, the 117th anniversary of the Battle of Trafalgar. His Excellency's removal of a large Union Flag with which the memorial was draped was the signal for the activation of the fountain. The King's Colour of the 33rd Battalion A.I.F. ('Armidale's Own') was displayed above the dais in token of the infantry unit in which most local volunteers had served.

The choice of date clearly demonstrated the continuing influence of the British naval tradition, one to which Australians long continued to look for comfort in an uncertain world. It also pointed to a parallel between two conflicts in which the Britain had defeated threats to her geopolitical position, one to which Australia was increasingly to appeal for defence against a Japan recently transformed from an ally into a suspicious rival and potential threat.

The memorial's controversial design, the result of a state-wide competition conducted by the state War Memorial Advisory Board, was very different from other proposals, which included a Victorian Italianate-style clocktower, a high school, a library, a memorial hall and an avenue of trees. A local newspaper noted that the executive's chairman, in confirming that he would have to approach the Minister for Lands for permission to erect the fountain, exclaimed 'If we've got to erect this design I hope we don't get permission', a comment which was followed by laughter. The executive had nonetheless to accept the board's choice, which was described as "unsightly and unpicturesque", and was likened to a duck pond or cattle trough. The somewhat austere form of the memorial was reinforced in 1924 with the mounting within the park of three guns captured by the A.I.F. It was not long before these became neglected; and in 1949 they were removed by resolution of Council.

=== Further developments ===
In 1925 the park's gas lighting was replaced by electric lamps, while in 1928 twelve outdoor chairs were provided by the Universal Rests Company. By this time the park had become a showpiece of the city, as noted by a former Mayor, W. Green, who in 1927 acknowledged Armidale as a city of learning and culture but asserted that "the most beautiful thing in Armidale is the Central Park". During the 1920s, the park was the location of public gatherings associated with the New England New State Movement, which, having its genesis in the mid-1850s, was particularly strong from the 1920s to the 1960s and very nearly made Armidale the capital of a new State of New England.

The Great Depression badly affected Armidale; yet Council's ability, like that of other NSW local government entities, to apply for funding under the Prevention and Relief of Unemployment Act 1930 (NSW) allowed Council to undertake public works otherwise beyond its resources. Between 1929 and 1934, some 17 aged trees, including ten pines, were removed, although another ten pines were spared because of the shade they offered. In 1936 the old perimeter fence was replaced by a six feet wide grass border, while in 1938, spurred by the CWA, a brick ladies' amenities block was erected addressing Tingcombe Street.

With the entry of Japan into the Second World War, fears were expressed as to the potential for air raids. Local school children were therefore put to work digging slit trenches in grassed areas of the park.

In 1950 the park was kerbed in concrete, while a dedicated gardener was appointed the following year. It may have been at this time that the original outer paths were abandoned in favour of the kerbside footpaths now evident. By 1954 the condition of the park had improved to the extent that Council in that year considered renaming it "Windsor Park" in commemoration of the Australian tour of HM Queen Elizabeth II, only recently crowned.

In the post-War period, the pine trees of Central Park attracted the interest of botanists employed at New England University College, now the University of New England. A senior lecturer, Mrs G. L. Davis, commenced to identify the different tree species, while in 1967 B. N. Richards, Senior Lecturer in Botany, stated that "Central Park represents one of the finest collections of conifers in Rural NSW". This encouraged a Council-sponsored movement to provide each tree with nameplates, a scheme first advocated by the Armidale and District Horticultural Society in 1931. By this time, also, the botanical resources of the park had attracted the notice of Lionel Gilbert, a lecturer in the Armidale College of Advanced Education. Gilbert was to become a nationally known botanical scholar and an honorary research associate of the Royal Botanic Gardens, Sydney. (Briggs)

In 1956 an avenue of trees addressing Tingcombe Street was planted to mark the centenary of responsible government in New South Wales. It was to identify this avenue that in November 1963 Governor, Sir Eric Woodward, unveiled a plaque as part of Council's centenary celebrations.

In 1959, the original 1922 Mediterranean cypresses surrounding the Great War memorial fountain were removed.

In 1959 the Armidale Tourist Bureau recommended the provision within the park of a map for tourists; but not 1966 was a contour model, constructed by the UNE Department of Geography and painted by the Armidale Arts Society, completed. This intrusive element was removed in 2017.

By the early 1960s, demand for inner-city parking had increased to the extent that Council approved a plan to remove all plantings along the edges of the park in favour of parking spaces. This met with sufficient public opposition as to cause its abandonment. Yet demand was such that in 1962 Council was forced to provide in Tingcombe Street a barrier kerb "to prevent the conversion of Central Park into a general parking ground for motor vehicles". This nevertheless involved the loss to parking of a long swathe of land along that street.

In June 1965 a basalt stone birdbath, erected by the Armidale branch of the Animal Welfare League with the assistance of the local Lions Club, was installed in memory of Rev. Reginald Arthur Harris, a New England clergyman and animal lover.

In 1968 a Christmas Crib was provided by public subscription for use in conjunction with Austrian wood-carved nativity figures; this display, calling attention to the proximity of the two Cathedral churches, continues to occur in December each year.

In 1970 a men's amenities block was constructed; in 2017 this was renovated so as to be more complementary to its surroundings.

On 3 December 1988 a memorial was dedicated a memorial to HMAS Armidale, a Royal Australian Navy Bathurst-class corvette. The only member of her class to be lost to enemy action, Armidale was commissioned in 1942 and sunk by Japanese aircraft off Portuguese Timor that same year. Addressing the corner of Faulkner Street and Tingcombe Street, the three-sided brick memorial features port holes reminiscent of a ship and also a flagstaff in the shape of a cross. In 2018 the memorial was relocated near the memorial fountain.

In 1999 the area of the park was slightly reduced by the construction of a roundabout at the corner of Barney Street and Dangar Street.

In 2000 a memorial to Brother Francis Gatti was constructed adjacent to the Great War memorial fountain; it consists of a short granite obelisk topped by a plaque, which like that of Sir Christopher Wren in St. Paul's Cathedral enjoins the reader 'si monumentum requiris, circumpice' : "if you seek his monument, look about you". One of the park's paths is named "Brother Gatti Walk".

In 2012 a National Service Memorial, consisting of a tiled brick plinth and a granite stone supporting a commemorative plaque, was constructed.

Central Park today contains a fine selection of cool climate conifers: these include pines (Pinus spp., such as Canary Island pine (P.canariensis), cedars (Cedrus spp., including blue Atlas cedar, C.atlantica "Glauca" and Himalayan cedar, C.deodara), Douglas fir (Pseudotsuga menziesii), and bunya pines (Araucaria bidwillii). It also contains deciduous and evergreen broadleaf trees: these include oaks (Quercus spp.), European elms (Ulmus procera) and ashes (Fraxinus spp., including claret ash, F. oxycarpa 'Raywood' ), many provided by the State Nursery at Campbelltown. Other trees, such as the Lucombe oak (Q. x hispanica 'Lucombeana' ) and southern live oak (Q. virginiana) are nationally rare. The statuesque quality of these mature exotic trees confers on the park a great dignity, and enhances its otherwise simple layout.

The former Armidale Dumaresq Council applied to have Central Park placed on the NSW State Heritage Register. The Australian Garden History Society's Northern NSW sub-branch was supportive of this listing, which occurred in December 2018.

== Description ==
Central Park, located near the historic centre of Armidale, bound by Dangar, Barney, and Faulkner Streets, and Tingcombe Lane, is a High Victorian formal town park demonstrating many of the key elements of that genre, including formal garden beds, axial planning, and symmetry. Originating in the original town plan, the park, on a slightly sloping site, has an area of approximately two hectares (five acres). It is dominated by mature conifers and deciduous tree species, the heights of which make it visible across a wide area. Its layout is formed by diagonal paths, originally of iron stone gravel but now of concrete, which converge on a war memorial fountain and associated garden. Annual bed plantings complement topiary forms of old elaeagnus and box shrubbery.

The war memorial fountain (1922) commemorates the Great War. Around it have been added smaller stones and plinths commemorating those who served in subsequent conflicts, particularly the Second World War. The park also features a band rotunda (1902) constructed as a memorial to the South African (Boer) War and two associated Mediterranean cypresses. A third memorial (1988) commemorates HMAS Armidale, a warship of the Royal Australian Navy. Central Park makes an important contribution to the nearby townscape, which includes prominent ecclesiastical buildings forming part of the individual settings. A period park bench (1928) survives.

Within Central Park is a fine selection of trees, many of them supplied by the State Nursery at Campbelltown; these include conifers and deciduous and evergreen broadleaf trees. Old shade trees, many dating from the 1880s and early 1900s, include Canary Island pines, two huge cypresses (Cupressus (now Hesperocyparis) macrocarpa), Chinese weeping cypresses (Funebris), Bhutan Cypresses (Torulosa), Douglas firs (Pseudotsuga menziesii), English or European oaks (Quercus robur), holly or holm oaks (Q. ilex), one cork oak (Q. suber) European elms (Ulmus procera) and cedars (Cedrus spp.). These are set in fine lawns which are shaded by the tree canopies. Some trees, such as the Lucombe oak (Q. x hispanica 'Lucombeana' ) and two Southern live oaks (Q. virginiana), one large, and one clipped, which are nationally rare. The trees are set in fine lawns naturally inhibited by the dense tree canopy.

Central Park is addressed by important heritage items such as St Peter's Cathedral, Saints Mary and Joseph Catholic Cathedral, and several other prominent religious, fraternal and residential structures.

=== Condition ===
As at 30 January 2018, the park and its built and natural elements are in good condition, the result of regular maintenance and a recognition of the park's prominence within the city.

=== Modifications and dates ===
The following modifications to the park have been made:

- 1849: Reserve No. 8 is one of several town reserves provided by the Armidale town plan
- 1874: Reserve No. 8 is dedicated
- 1879: Trees, provided by Somerset Nursery, Parramatta, are planted in the reserve
- 1882: Reserve Trustees are appointed; Brother Francis Gatti begins work on the reserve
- 1884: By this time, the basic layout of the reserve has been established
- 1885: Gas lamps are provided at the centre of the reserve
- 1890: Reserve No. 8 is known as Armidale Park
- 1891: Death of Brother Francis Gatti
- 1892: The park is known as Central Park
- 1902: William Murray memorial, flanked by two Mediterranean cypresses, is constructed
- 1902: South African War (Boer War) memorial band rotunda is opened
- 1912: Dead trees are replaced, the centre of the park is fenced, and seating is provided
- 1913: New park gates are installed
- 1922: Great War memorial fountain, surrounded by Mediterranean cypresses, is constructed
- 1925: Electric lighting is provided
- 1928: Replacement outdoor seating is installed
- 1942: Slit trenches are dug as a precaution against potential Japanese air raids
- 1950: Concrete kerbing is provided around the periphery of the park
- 1956: An avenue of trees is planted addressing Tingcombe Street
- 1959: The Mediterranean cypresses surrounding the Great War memorial fountain are removed
- 1962: A swathe of the park addressing Tingcombe Street is given over to car parking
- 1965: Rev. Reginal Harris memorial fountain is constructed
- 1966: A contour model of Armidale is constructed
- 1968: A Christmas Crib is constructed for annual use in association with carved figurines
- 1970: Gentlemen's lavatory is constructed
- 1988: HMAS Armidale memorial is constructed
- 1999: Roundabout constructed at corner of Barney and Dangar Streets
- 2000: Brother Francis Gatti memorial is constructed
- 2012: National Service Memorial is constructed
- 2013: A diseased elm, thought to be one of the 1880 plantings, is removed
- 2014: A diseased English oak on the south-east axial path is replaced by an advanced English oak
- 2017: The gentlemen's lavatory is renovated, rendering it more complementary to the park. Two unsympathetic brick-built display structures, together with the contour map and Weldmesh plant guard fencing, are removed.

== Heritage listing ==
As at 26 June 2018, Central Park, Armidale, is of state heritage significance as an outstanding example in NSW of a substantially intact High Victorian formal town park incorporating many elements of its type and demonstrably influencing the townscape of an important NSW inland city. In this connection the park evinces a demonstrative layout and key High Victorian design elements. Central Park is of state heritage significance as a focus for important ecclesiastical, fraternal and residential buildings, some of which are of state heritage significance. The park's band rotunda is of state heritage significance as the only one in NSW, and potentially in Australia, built solely in commemoration of the South African War (Boer War). Its Great War memorial fountain is of state heritage significance as the only one in NSW, and potentially in Australia, built solely in commemoration of that conflict. Central Park is also of state heritage significance in containing trees that are nationally rare, as well as in possessing what has been assessed as one of the finest collections of conifers in regional NSW, making it an important reference site for that type of tree. Central Park may have local heritage significance for its association with Charles Moore, a former director of the Botanic Garden, Sydney, and with Lionel Gilbert, a New England botanical scholar and teacher. It has state heritage significance for its potential to provide further information as to nineteenth century relationships between regional NSW communities and metropolitan horticultural agencies and nurseries.

Central Park was listed on the New South Wales State Heritage Register on 19 December 2018 having satisfied the following criteria.

The place is important in demonstrating the course, or pattern, of cultural or natural history in New South Wales.

Central Park is of state heritage significance as a remarkably intact High Victorian park that has demonstrably influenced the development of the important NSW inland city of Armidale, particularly in stimulating the development nearby of key civic buildings with the park as their focus. These include two cathedrals of state heritage significance. Central Park has local heritage significance in demonstrating the local influence of the second major nineteenth century period of creation of public parks by NSW local government agencies.

The place has a strong or special association with a person, or group of persons, of importance of cultural or natural history of New South Wales's history.

Central Park is of local heritage significance for its strong and demonstrated association with Charles Moore who, for over 48 years was Director of the Botanic Gardens, Sydney. Moore founded the State Nursery (Campbelltown) which, in dispatching trees all over NSW, was instrumental in the horticultural development of public spaces throughout NSW. Central Park is also associated with Lional Gilbert, a nationally known botanical scholar and teacher long resident in New England.

The place is important in demonstrating aesthetic characteristics and/or a high degree of creative or technical achievement in New South Wales.

Central Park is of state heritage significance in embracing an intact layout and key High Victorian design elements. In its interaction with the important ecclesiastical buildings situated nearby, it is of local heritage significance as Armidale's de facto town square.

The place has potential to yield information that will contribute to an understanding of the cultural or natural history of New South Wales.

Central Park has local heritage significance for its potential to provide information as to nineteenth century relationships between regional NSW communities and major metropolitan plant nurseries, particularly the State Nursery (Campbelltown), an instrumentality of the former Botanic Garden, Sydney.

The place possesses uncommon, rare or endangered aspects of the cultural or natural history of New South Wales.

Central Park is of state heritage significance in possessing what has been assessed as one of the finest collections of conifers in regional NSW, making it an important reference site for that type of tree. It is also of state heritage significance in containing nationally rare trees such as the Lucombe oak and Southern live oak and a representative array of other conifers and Northern Hemisphere woodland tree species. Central Park is also of state heritage significance for two of its war memorials. The war memorial band rotunda is the only one in NSW, and potentially in Australia, built solely in commemoration of the South African War (Boer War). The Great War memorial fountain is, likewise, the only one in NSW, and potentially in Australia, built solely in commemoration of that conflict.

The place is important in demonstrating the principal characteristics of a class of cultural or natural places/environments in New South Wales.

Central Park is of state heritage significance as an outstanding example in NSW of a remarkably intact High Victorian formal town park demonstrating many of the key elements of its type while enjoying a symbiotic relationship with important ecclesiastical, fraternal and residential buildings, some of which are of state heritage significance.

== See also ==
- Parks in New South Wales
