= Gosling Memorial Library =

The Gosling Memorial Library was a library located on Duckworth Street in downtown St. John's, Newfoundland, Canada. Erected in January 1936, the library is often considered an important staple in Newfoundland's history.

== William Gilbert Gosling ==
Born in Bermuda in September 1863, William Gilbert Gosling was the second of six sons. He was known for being a political figure, author and businessman. He was the Mayor of St. John's Newfoundland and Labrador from 1916 to 1920.

== Establishment of the library ==
The Gosling Memorial Library was established by Gilbert Gosling's wife, Armine Nutting Gosling, in January 1936. During a time of financial hardships, the opening of a public library was seen as a positive impact on the country of Newfoundland. Upon opening, the library became the main source of many forms of literature nationwide .

The Gosling Memorial Library was opened on Duckworth Street in downtown St. John's. In February 1948, the library relocated to the basement of the building it was originally located in when a law firm moved out. When the library relocated, the layout was significantly improved. A children's section was made separate from adults, along with the staff area being improved upon. The cataloguing methods were also improved upon, as well as distribution methods in an effort improve efficiency and accessibility.

== Content/collection ==
Initially, there were over 4,000 books donated from the huge collection of books that belonged to Gosling himself, donated by his wife, Armine. As the library grew in popularity, it also grew in quantity. In its prime, the library was home to over 80,000 different pieces of literature that were distributed across the entire island. The Gosling Memorial Library included travelling libraries with volunteer workers that went across the country distributing books to different parts of the island.

== Impact ==
The opening of the Gosling Memorial Library had a significant impact on the literacy and quality education of adults in Newfoundland. Having access to such a large number of books allowed people to expand on their knowledge of various subjects and improve their knowledge on their specific field of study.

Famous local Joey Smallwood was known for researching information for his popular radio show in the Gosling Library.
