= Mary Adelaide Nutting =

Canadian nurse, educator and pioneer in the field of hospital care

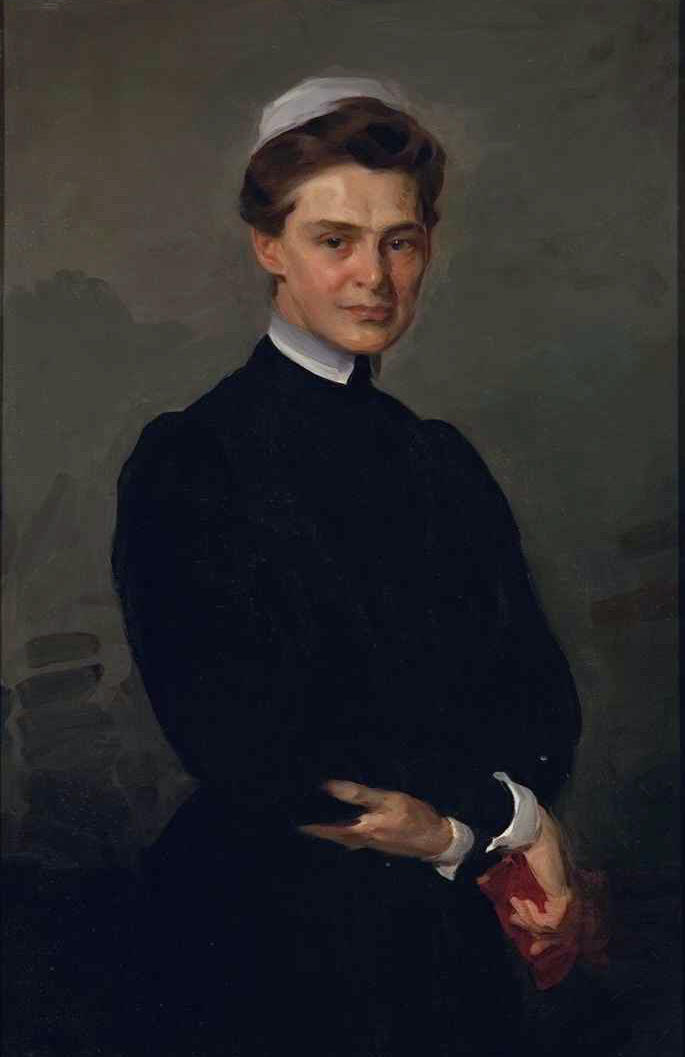
- Born: Mary Adelaide Nutting; November 1, 1858; Canada East
- Died: October 3, 1948 (aged 89); White Plains, New York
- Education: School of Nursing, Johns Hopkins University
- Relatives: Armine Nutting Gosling (sister)
- Medical career
- Profession: Nursing
- Institutions: School of Nursing, Johns Hopkins University Teachers College, Columbia University

Mary Adelaide Nutting (November 1, 1858 – October 3, 1948) was a Canadian nurse, educator, and pioneer in the field of hospital care. After graduating from Johns Hopkins University's first nurse training program in 1891, Nutting helped to found a modern nursing program at the school. In 1907, she became involved in an experimental program at the new Teachers College at Columbia University. Ascending to the role of chair of the nursing and health department, Nutting authored a vanguard curriculum based on preparatory nursing education, public health studies, and social service emphasis. She served as president of a variety of councils and committees that served to standardize nursing education and ease the process of meshing nurse-profession interest with state legislation. Nutting was also the author of a multitude of scholarly works relating to the nursing field, and her work, A History of Nursing, remains an essential historic writing today. She is remembered for her legacy as a pioneer in the field of nursing, but also her activist role in a time when women still had limited rights.

== Early life ==
In November 1858, Mary Adelaide Nutting was born to Vespasian and Harriet Sophia Nutting at a hospital in Frost Village, District of East Canada (present-day Quebec). Her parents were of English descent. Her ancestors seem to have been Loyalists who emigrated to Canada from the US. This was a common trend for many people who remained loyal to the English crown during the American Revolutionary War, and subsequent to the US victory fled the country to seek refuge in the British colony of Quebec. One of six children, she was particularly close to her only sister, who shared similar interest in the arts and music. At a young age, Nutting's family moved to Waterloo, and this is where she spent a better part of her childhood.

=== Education ===
Despite coming from meager economic means, all the children received an education at the local village academy. Nutting's father was a court clerk whose income made it difficult to make ends meet. However, he thought that it was essential that his children get the chance to attend school. A gifted student, passionate about her studies, Nutting studied at the Bute House School in Montreal, and spent a brief period at a convent school in St. Johns Newfoundland. In 1881, Nutting, along with her mother and her siblings, took up residence in Ottawa, where she became involved in the fields of music and design. Having found her first real niche, she spent a brief time studying the arts in Lowell, Massachusetts, and continued this education back in Ottawa. Nutting's sister was the principal at the Cathedral School for Girls, and this opened the door for Nutting's first real experience with teaching, as she spent a year instructing piano and music education. She is remembered as a very independent woman, and made the personal decision early on to not marry to prevent any hindrance of her career aspirations.

== Affiliation with Johns Hopkins University ==
Nutting had an early interest in the arts, but, largely influenced by her admiration for Florence Nightingale, the British war-time nurse and patron of the modern nursing field, she developed a budding interest in nursing. This was compounded by the fact that Nutting underwent the painful experience of watching her mother slowly die at the hands of "incompetent" health care. Almost by sheer chance, she came across a newspaper article advertising for a brand-new opportunity to participate in a nurse training program at Johns Hopkins University in Baltimore.

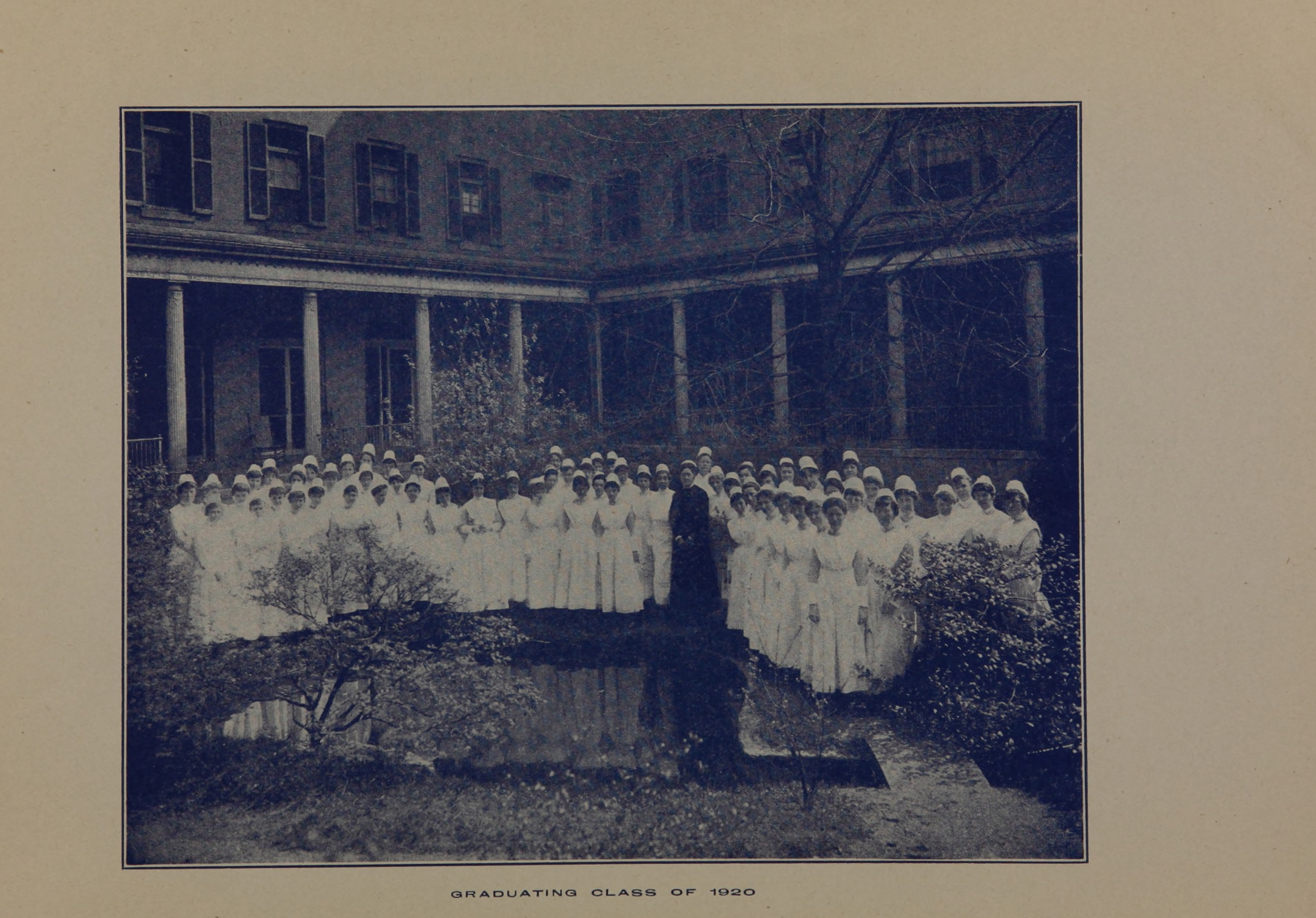
Johns Hopkins School of Nursing (1922)

=== Johns Hopkins nursing program ===
In October 1889, at the age of 31, Nutting was one of 17 students to enroll in the inaugural class at the Johns Hopkins school of nursing. This training program was a unique opportunity because admission required no prior experience or higher education; also, those who came from humble means still had accessibility to the school because rather than charge admission, students were required to work at the hospital and received a small salary. Nutting graduated from Johns Hopkins in 1891, placing fourth in her class. She decided to remain on the campus, taking a position as head nurse. In 1893, Nutting was promoted to assistant superintendent, and served under her close acquaintance Isabel Hampton. When Hampton made the decision to resign just a year later, Nutting assumed the role as superintendent and principal of the nursing school, which entailed both administrative and hospital service leadership.

=== Advances in nursing education at Johns Hopkins ===
In her newfound position of authority, Nutting saw an opportunity to make changes to the program at Johns Hopkins University and breakthroughs in the development of nursing curricula throughout the country. As one account says of her succession to superintendent: "Thus began her lifelong crusade to bring education of nurses within universities." One of the major flaws of the training school at Hopkins was that while the school allowed lower-class individuals to attend, a much heavier emphasis was placed on the time spent served laboring in the hospital than on the educational aspects. This posed a twofold problem; first, it was unfair to students who were seeking a serious academic program, and instead were being supplanted as cheap additional staff to the hospital; second, these students were thrown into action without any real preliminary training, which could lead to inadequate service. They were serving on average 60–105 hours a week, which left practically no time to focus on their school work. While at the time conditions at the nursing school were less than ideal, the late 19th century marked the first significant advancement in medical studies. In 1893, The Johns Hopkins Medical School was founded, and this drew a sharper focus to the need to reform preexisting practices. To address the obstacles within her own program, Nutting met with the trustees in 1895 to convey the "exploitative" nature of the current system. Incorporating detailed statistical analysis and data, Nutting's work, The Statistical Report of Work Hours in Training School, highlighted the drawbacks of using students as hospital staff. Considered the "Magna Carta" of nurse teaching, her presentation convinced Hopkins leadership to make drastic reforms. Work stipends were replaced with scholarships, and the training school was expanded to a three-year program with fewer work hours. Further, Nutting instituted a watershed preparatory program that served the purpose of easing nurses in the hospital environment, including classes in anatomy, physiology, materia medica, and hygiene. This was one of the first of its kind. Nutting also made early breakthroughs in the field of public health, instituting nursing programs that provided at-home care for people in poorer communities, especially for sick mothers. Finally, Nutting was instrumental in the creation of the Johns Hopkins' Nursing Library, and the materials collected within its shelves would later be important to her book, History of Nursing. This work, a four-volume series, written from 1907 to 1912 and co-authored by Lavinia Dock, provided a comprehensive account of nursing practice up to that point.

== Impact on the development of nursing curricula and standards ==
Nutting's aim to create a change in nursing at the time was not limited to within Johns Hopkins. She also had a substantial impact on standardizing the field throughout the country. An important member of the American Society of Superintendents of Training Schools for Nurses of the US and Canada ( which later became the National League of Nursing Education), she helped lead the movement to implement industry guidelines, and served as acting president twice in 1896 and 1909. Further, Nutting established the American Journal of Nursing (1900), which provided a crucial information source for aspiring professionals and scholars. She also was the founder of the Maryland State Association of Graduate Nurses, and held the position of president in 1903. This association not only served as a liaison between nurses and the state, but also helped in the process of creating legislation that regarded the profession. One of these landmark pieces of legislation was the Maryland Registration Act of 1904, which registered and governed practicing nurses. Nutting was awarded RN card No. 1, marking her as the first registered nurse in the state of Maryland.

== Teachers College at Columbia University ==
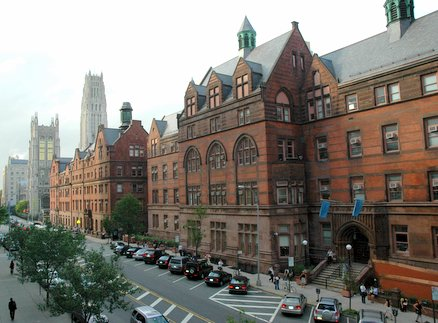
Teachers College Columbia University (21st century)

Nutting's ultimate goal was to coalesce nurse training schools with university education systems, which was not going to be attainable during her time at Hopkins. Therefore, in 1889, Nutting convinced the new dean at the Teachers College at Columbia, James E. Russell, to allow nurses to partake in hospital economics and physiology courses offered at the institution. The Teachers College was the first established school of education in the country, and Nutting believed nurses going into teaching and administrative positions would vastly benefit from studies at the school. Initially, she commuted between Baltimore and New York City, teaching part-time at both universities. In 1907, after enjoying great success at her position at Columbia, Nutting took on a full-time position as a professor in institutional management. This was a historical achievement, as she was the first nurse to ever assume a chair position at a university. Johns Hopkins was greatly disappointed at the loss of such a major figure in the medical world, but the school acknowledged that Nutting would continue to play a major role in Maryland. In 1910, she was awarded the role of chairman of the department of nursing and health. Dean Russell proclaimed Nutting one of "the ablest men of either sex." In her "chairman" position, Nutting configured a world-renowned program in hospital administration and nurse education. Her ideology of nursing purported a "humanistic approach" where nurses served the role as both medical professionals and social workers. In 1920, Nutting was recognized for all her contributions with the Adelaide Nutting Historical Collection at Teachers College, which held a massive collection of works on her longtime idol, Florence Nightingale. In 1925, she retired from her position as chair. To this day, Nutting is remembered as one of the most instrumental factors in developing the nursing program at Columbia.

=== Published works while at Teachers College ===
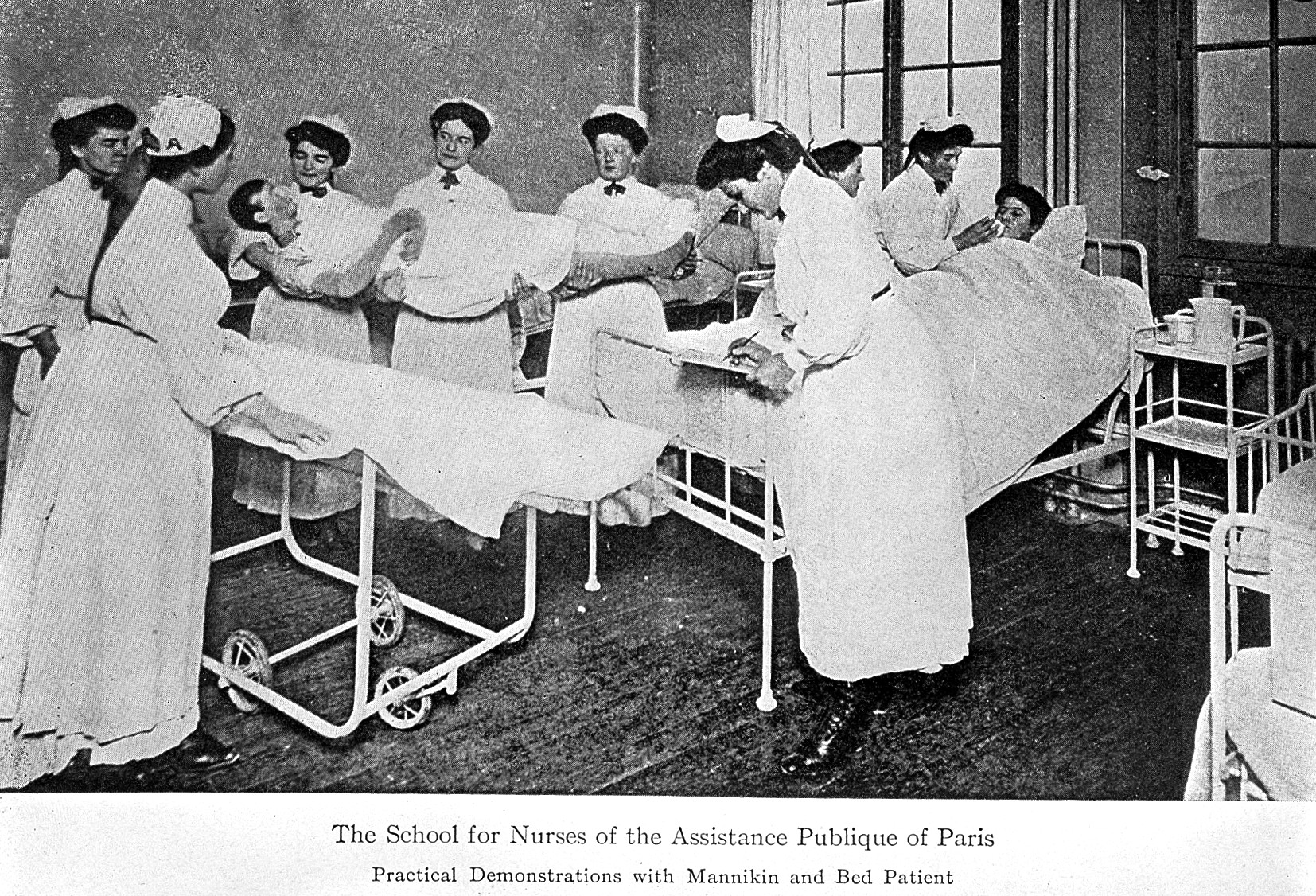
Excerpted from Nutting's "A History of Nursing" (1912)

Mary Adelaide Nutting is perhaps the most prominent figure in the development of the modern field of nursing. On top of all her work with crafting curricula and administrative duties, she also contributed to a series of published works that remain crucial to nursing academics. As one bibliography writes, "Every significant nursing study published in the early 1900s was associated in some way with Adelaide Nutting."

A list of some of her most important works:

- A History of Nursing (1907–1912)
- Educational Status of Nursing (1912)
- Standard Curriculum for Schools of Nursing (1917)
- Nursing and Nursing Education in the United States (1923)
- A Sound Economic Basis for Schools of Nursing (1926)

== World War I ==
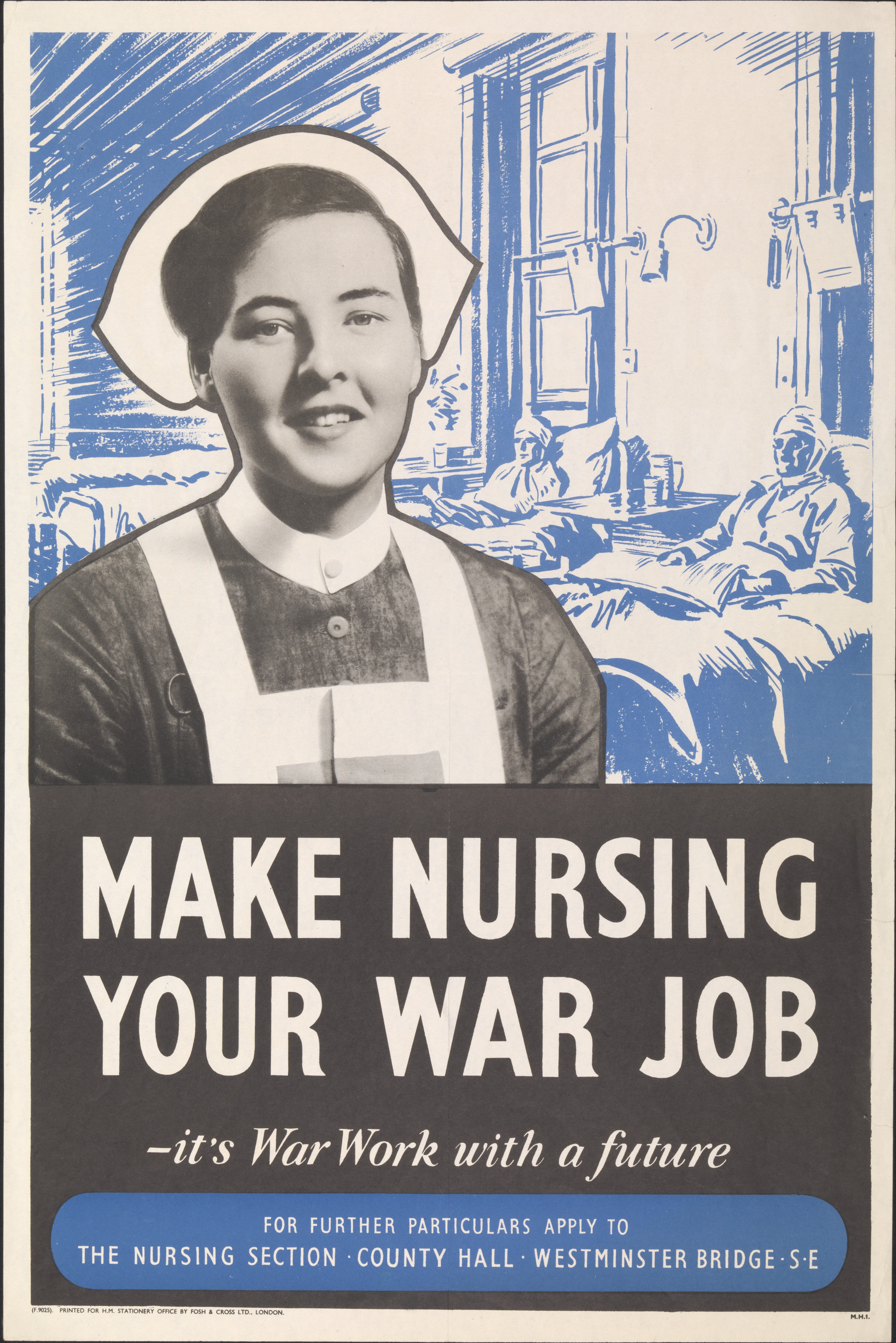
Recruitment poster for nurses during WW1

Despite being a Canadian citizen, Mary Adelaide Nutting was more than willing to assist in the home effort when war erupted in Europe. In 1917 as the US entered WWI, she called together the National Emergency Committee on Nursing to assist with the war support. Further, Woodrow Wilson appointed her to the chairmanship of the committee on nursing for the medical board of the Council of National Defense. Under this role, Nutting lead point in ensuring that there were enough nurses supporting the soldiers, and that they had adequate resources to treat patients. Through newspaper articles, she appealed to the public to assist in supporting the war efforts. Nutting's administrative organization would again be employed during WWII because of its prior success. After the war's completion, Nutting was awarded with the Liberty Science Medal, presented to her by the Council of the National Institute for Social Sciences. The award commended her for her patriotism and devotion to the war effort.

== Death and legacy ==
Nutting is warmly remembered as independent, motivated, and passionate by those who knew her best. She died of pneumonia in October 1948, in White Plains, New York, quite close to her 90th birthday. She had a traditional Anglican ceremony, and her ashes were buried at sea. Mary Adelaide Nutting led the nursing community for over 30 years, and her influence on the field is still greatly felt today. At a commencement presentation at Yale University, the professor that introduced Nutting called her "one of the most useful women in the world". Nutting was involved in a variety of women's suffrage movements and programs, and was also a staunch advocate for making education and medical care more accessible to all people. She was a pioneer of education, hospital administration, and other fields. In 1944, Nutting was awarded a medal in her name, presented by the National League of Nursing. The "Mary Adelaide Nutting Award" is given once a year, to a recipient who was shown devotion and furthered the development of nursing education.

== Bibliography ==
- "Mary Adelaide Nutting." Dictionary of American Biography, Charles Scribner's Sons, 1974. Biography in Context, link.galegroup.com/apps/doc/BT2310006535/BIC1?u=balt85423&xid=0c2811fa. Accessed 20 April 2017.
- The Editors of Encyclopædia Britannica. "Mary Adelaide Nutting." Encyclopædia Britannica. Encyclopædia Britannica, Inc., 10 Feb. 2000. Web. 20 April 2017.
- "The Arrival of the Loyalists in Canada." The Arrival of the Loyalists in Canada | Site for Language Management in Canada (SLMC) – Official Languages and Bilingualism Institute (OLBI). N.p., n.d. Web. 20 April 2017.
- Mary Adelaide Nutting, MSA SC 3520-13593. N.p., n.d. Web. 20 April 2017.
- Selanders, Louise. "Florence Nightingale." Encyclopædia Britannica. Encyclopædia Britannica, Inc., 15 Feb. 2017. Web. 21 April 2017.
- 01, Conference Room. Mary Adelaide Nutting, Maryland Women's Hall of Fame. N.p., n.d. Web. 21 April 2017.
- "Mary Adelaide Nutting Collection." Medical Archives - Personal Paper Collections: Mary Adelaide Nutting Collection. N.p., n.d. Web. 21 April 2017.
- "About TC | Teachers College Columbia University." Teachers College - Columbia University. N.p., n.d. Web. 21 April 2017.
- Goostray, Stella. "Mary Adelaide Nutting." The American Journal of Nursing, vol. 58, no. 11, 1958, pp. 1524–1529., www.jstor.org/stable/3566452.
- Full Text of "The British Journal of Nursing". N.p., n.d. Web
