= Walter Edward Davidson =

British colonial administrator and diplomat

Sir Walter Edward Davidson KCMG, KStJ
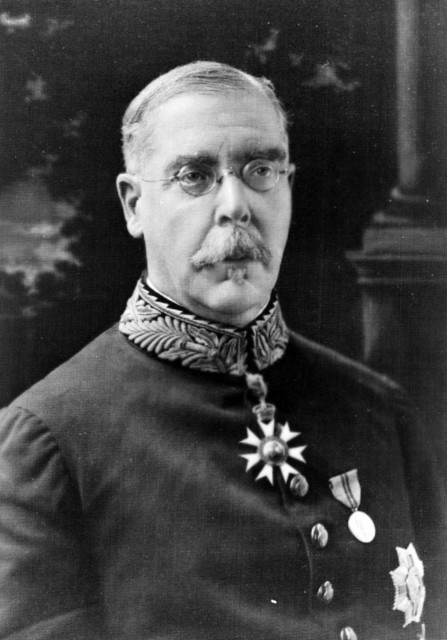

24th Governor of New South Wales
- In office 17 February 1918 – 16 September 1923
- Monarch: George V
- Premier: See list: William Holman John Storey James Dooley George Fuller James Dooley George Fuller
- Lieutenant: Sir William Cullen
- Preceded by: Gerald Strickland
- Succeeded by: Dudley de Chair

62nd Governor of Newfoundland
- In office 15 January 1913 – 15 September 1917
- Monarch: George V
- Prime Minister: Edward Morris
- Preceded by: Ralph Champneys Williams
- Succeeded by: Charles Alexander Harris

Personal details
- Born: 20 April 1859 Valletta, Crown Colony of Malta
- Died: 16 September 1923 (aged 64) Sydney, New South Wales, Australia
- Spouse: Dame Margaret Davidson
- Education: Christ's College, Cambridge

Sir Walter Edward Davidson, KCMG, KStJ (20 April 1859 – 16 September 1923) was a British colonial administrator and diplomat. He served periods as Governor of the Seychelles, Governor of Newfoundland and as Governor of New South Wales, where he died in office.

== Early life and career ==
Born on 20 April 1859 at Valletta on the Crown Colony of Malta, Davidson was the son of James Davidson of Killyleagh, Ireland, an agent for the Peninsular and Oriental Steam Navigation Company. After being educated at Magdalen College School, Oxford, Davidson graduated from Christ's College, Cambridge. In 1880 he entered the Ceylon Civil Service and, by 1898, had risen to be Chairman of the Colombo Municipal Council and Mayor of Colombo (1897–1898). Following the peace treaty for the Second Boer War in South Africa in May 1902, Davidson was on 21 June appointed Colonial Secretary in the Colony of Transvaal, and thus a member of the executive council of the governor, Lord Milner. He was appointed a Companion of the Order of Saint Michael and Saint George (CMG) in the November 1902 Birthday Honours list. In the following years he was involved in the post-Boer War reconstruction of the colony, until he left the office in 1904.

== Governor of Seychelles and Newfoundland ==
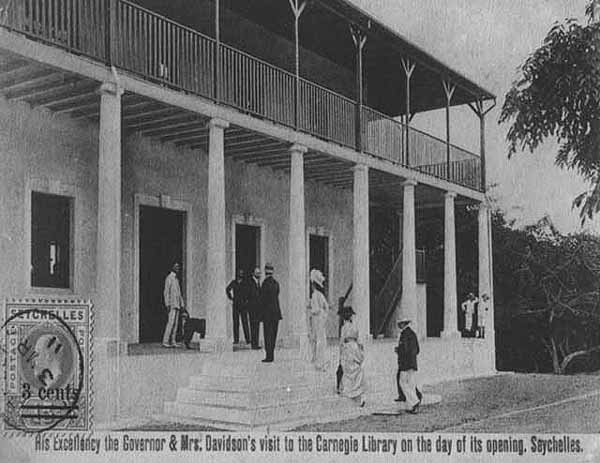
Governor and Lady Davidson visiting the Carnegie Library (now the National Library of Seychelles) at the day of its opening in 1910

In mid 1904 he was appointed as Governor of the Seychelles, which had become a separate colony from Mauritius in 1903. On 21 October 1907 he married Margaret Agnes Feilding, the daughter of General Sir Percy Feilding. As governor, Davidson involved himself in the development of the new colony and made regular visits throughout the colony to increase the visibility of his role. During his administration he was responsible for the construction of the Le Niol Reservoir, the Carnegie Library and also for the design of the Colonial State House of which he was the first occupant. In 1911 he received the King George V Coronation Medal. He remained in the Seychelles until his promotion in 1912.

On 15 January 1913, Davidson was appointed as Governor of the Dominion of Newfoundland. For his long service, he was appointed a Knight Commander of the Order of St Michael and St George in 1914. During the First World War, Davidson helped direct Newfoundland's military effort in his role as Chairman of the Newfoundland Patriotic Association, and was very influential in public affairs. As Honorary Colonel of the Royal Newfoundland Regiment and as Commander-in-Chief of the Newfoundland Forces, he played an active role in recruitment and organisation. His term expired and he left Newfoundland in 1917 just as the financial situation for Newfoundland was in sharp decline, and the political consensus over which he and the prime minister, Sir Edward Morris, had presided since 1914, was breaking down.

== Governor of New South Wales ==
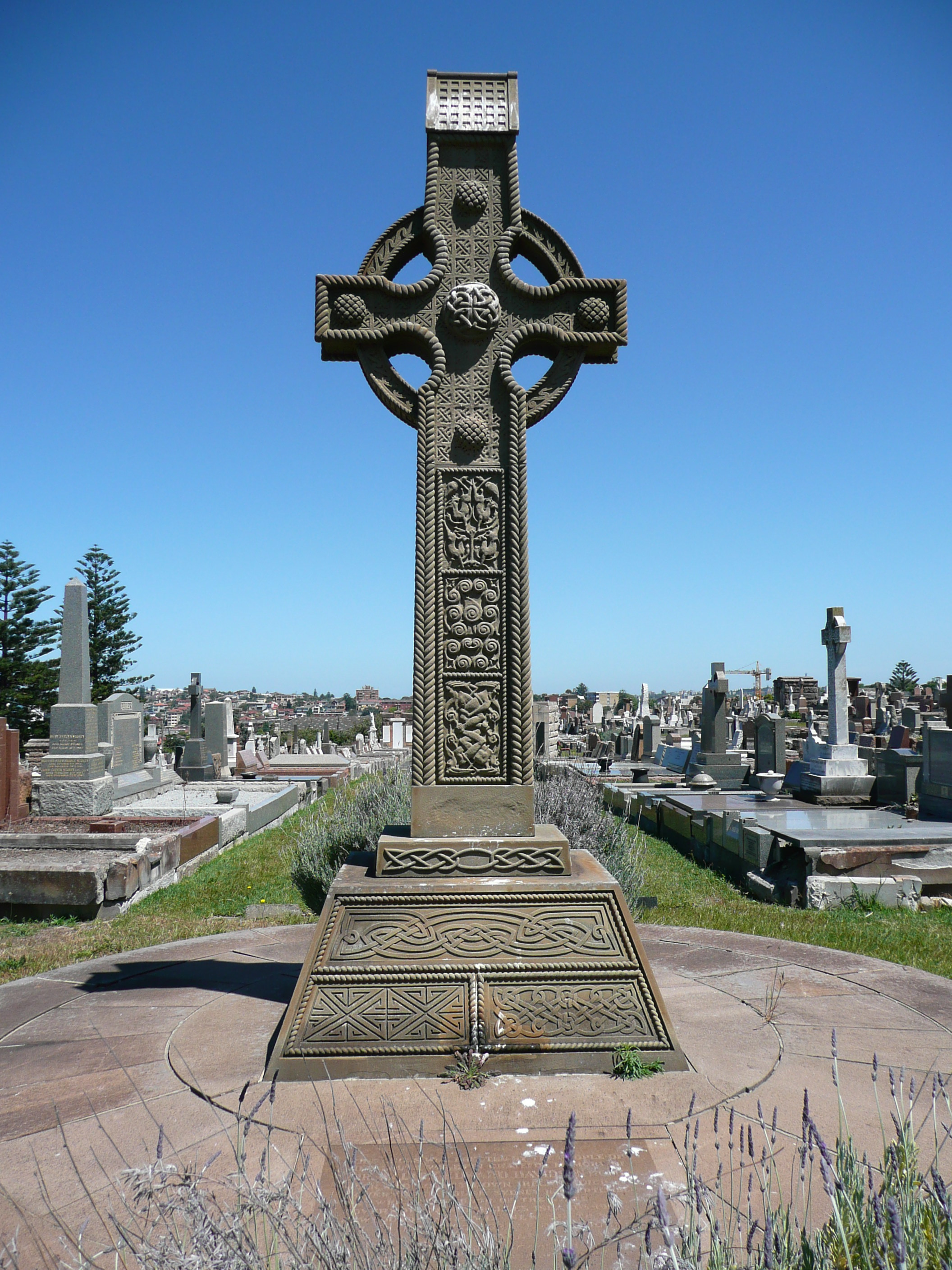
Grave of Walter Edward Davidson, South Head Cemetery, Vaucluse, New South Wales

In September 1917 Davidson was recommended and appointed as the next Governor of New South Wales, succeeding Sir Gerald Strickland. He arrived in Sydney on 17 February 1918. Despite a reduction by Premier William Holman in the governor's allocated funds, the Davidsons entered enthusiastically into the round of vice-regal duties. For her work with the Red Cross Society, both in Newfoundland and New South Wales, Lady Davidson was appointed as a Dame Commander of the Order of the British Empire in 1918, and in August 1920 presided at a meeting to inaugurate the State branch of the Girl Guides' Association. As governor, he was made a Knight of Grace of the Venerable Order of St John of Jerusalem on 25 October 1916 and a member of the Savile Club, London.

In January 1920 the Labor Premier, John Storey, sought Davidson's approval concerning additional appointments to the New South Wales Legislative Council. Though he was of the opinion that the size of the Upper House ought not to be increased, in August Davidson approved the nomination of sixteen new members. On 20 December 1920, Storey's successor, James Dooley, and his cabinet resigned after having lost a vote in the New South Wales Legislative Assembly a week before. Davidson then commissioned the Leader of the Opposition, Sir George Fuller, as premier. However, as Fuller did not have a majority, his attempts to form government failed. After serving as premier for seven hours, Fuller requested a double-dissolution from Davidson. Davidson refused, on the basis that Dooley still had a majority in the lower house, and Fuller resigned. Davidson then re-commissioned Dooley, who was granted a dissolution. Upon Dooley's defeat in the March 1921 elections, Davidson wrote to the Secretary of State for the Colonies, Winston Churchill, of his "Labour friends: they were likeable men, upright and simple, and not ashamed to take advice". In September 1922 it was announced that his term of office would be extended until March 1924.

In June 1920, Davidson hosted the 26-year-old Prince Edward, Prince of Wales during his visit to Australia and New Zealand. The Prince, in writing to his mistress Freda Dudley Ward, expressed a characteristically acerbic low opinion of Davidson in his role as governor: "I can hardly bring myself even to talk to these - Davidsons!! However they are tamer than when we arrived not that that is saying vewy much; they really are the most impossible couple & no wonder the dominions get fed up with the Old Country & want to abolish all Imperial Governors if the Colonial Office will insist on sending out such hopeless boobs!! ... what a lot of harm is done throughout the Empire by the rotten Governors they appoint who are nearly always pompous duds who they don’t want in London!!".

While still in office, Davidson died of cardiovascular disease at Government House, Sydney on 16 September 1923. After lying-in-state at St Andrew's Cathedral, Sydney and a full state funeral, he was buried in South Head cemetery, where in 1925 a memorial was erected by public subscription. On the news of his death, the Sydney Morning Herald paid tribute to his "Splendid record of Empire service" and noted that "the whole community shares a common and heartfelt sorrow at the passing of the one of the most distinguished and popular of His Majesty's overseas representatives".

== Legacy ==
After his death, in October 1923, an area of land around Frenchs Forest was proclaimed as "Davidson Park State Recreation Area" in his honour and, subsequently, the suburb of Davidson that developed later took his name, including the NSW state electoral district in 1971, and the local high school in 1972. In recognition of Lady Davidson's service, Lady Davidson Hospital in North Turramurra was dedicated in 1923 and Lady Davidson Circuit in Forestville.

== Honours ==
Viceregal styles of Sir Walter Davidson
- Reference style: His Excellency
- Spoken style: Your Excellency

Knight Commander of the Order of St Michael and St George (KCMG)	1914
Commander of the Order of St Michael and St George (CMG)	1902
Knight of Grace of the Venerable Order of St John of Jerusalem (KStJ)	1916
King George V Coronation Medal	1911

=== Arms ===
Coat of arms of Walter Edward Davidson

Crest
On a wreath of the colours, a falcon's head and neck couped proper.
Escutcheon
Azure, on a fesse wavy between in chief two pheons and in base a four-leaved shamrock slipped argent, a stag lodged gules, attired with ten tines or.
Motto
Latin: Viget in cinere virtus (Virtue flourishes after death)
Other elements
Mantling azure and argent.

Government offices
Preceded by George Vandeleur Fiddes	Colonial Secretary of the Transvaal; 1902–1903	Succeeded by Patrick Duncan
Preceded by Sir Ernest Sweet-Escott	Governor of the Seychelles; 1904–1912	Succeeded by Sir Charles O'Brien
Preceded by Sir Ralph Williams	Governor of Newfoundland; 1913–1917	Succeeded by Sir Charles Harris
Preceded by Sir Gerald Strickland	Governor of New South Wales; 1918–1923	Succeeded by Sir Dudley de Chair
