= Central Aircraft Company =

Defunct aircraft manufacturer

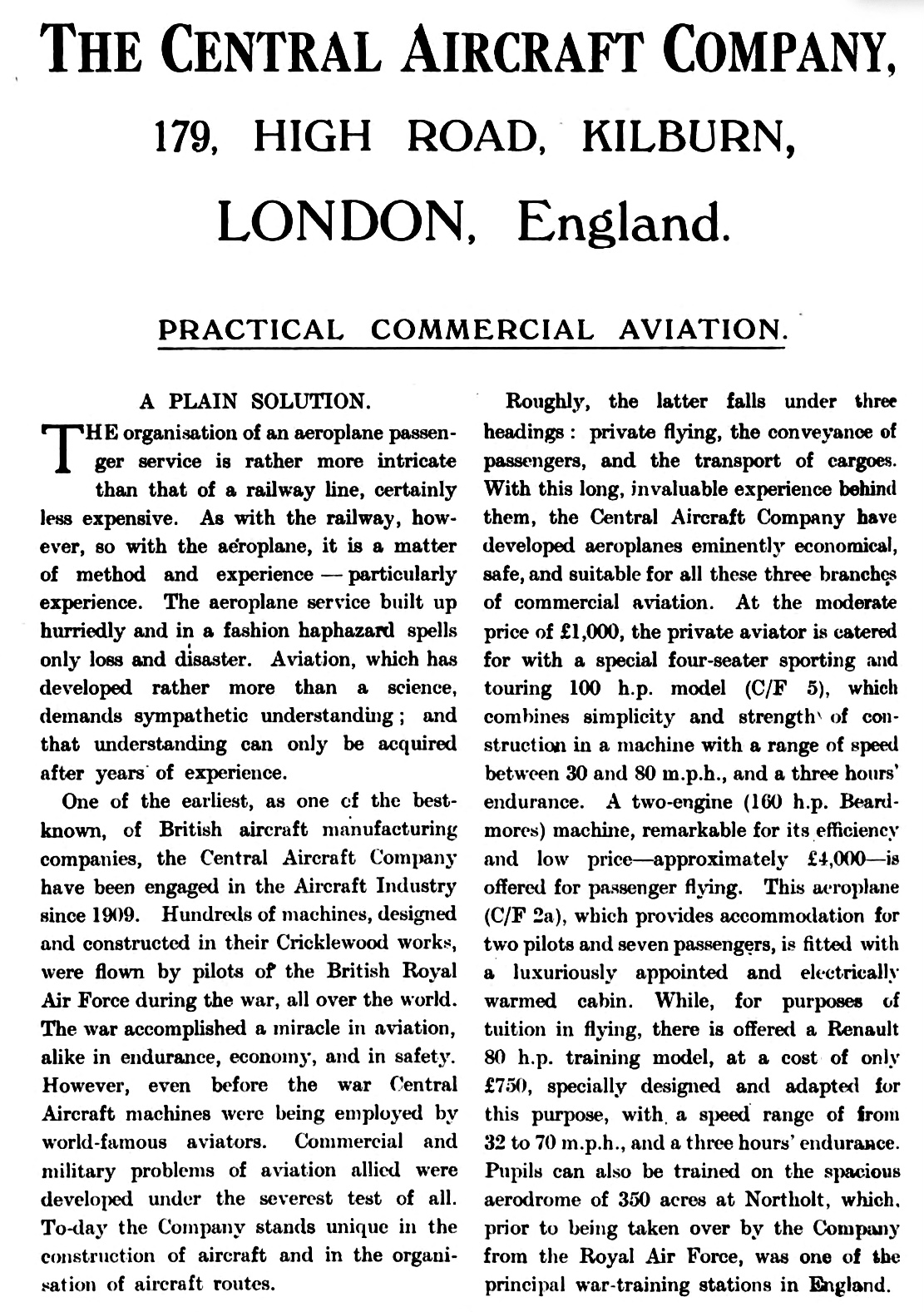
Central Aircraft Company Limited (1919)

Central Aircraft Company Limited was a British aircraft manufacturer from its formation in 1916 to its closure in 1926.

== History ==
The company was formed in 1916 as a subsidiary of the woodworking firm R. Cattle Limited. In common with other joinery companies during the First World War it turned to sub-contract manufacturing of aircraft components. In 1919 shortly after the end of the war the company produced two original designs, the Centaur IV and Centaur IIA. The aircraft were built at the company works at Kilburn, London. The first aircraft were flown from a field next to the factory, but later aircraft were test flown and operated from Northolt Aerodrome. Unable to sell the aircraft the company used the Centaur IV for joyriding and training. The last aircraft produced was the Sayers Monoplane, built for the 1922 Itford Hill gliding competition. The company closed in May 1926.

== Aircraft designs ==
- Central Centaur IV
- Central Centaur IIA
- Sayers S.C.W.
