= Central Centaur IV =

Centaur IV

General information
- Type: three-seat biplane trainer
- Manufacturer: Central Aircraft Company Limited
- Designer: A A Fletcher
- Primary user: Central Aircraft Flying School
- Number built: 8

History
- First flight: 1919

The Central Centaur IV, a.k.a. Central C.F.5, was a British civil two/three-seat biplane aircraft produced by Central Aircraft Company Limited of London.

== History ==
The Centaur IV was a two-seat wire-braced, fabric-covered wooden biplane designed by A.A. Fletcher. It was the first original design to be built by Central Aircraft Company at Kilburn, London during 1919. The prototype had a 70 hp (52 kW) Renault air-cooled V-8 engine but the seven production aircraft were fitted with an Anzani radial engine.

The Centaur IV was originally proposed in two versions:

- A two-seat aircraft, with the two seats side-by-side in an open cockpit;
- A three-seat aircraft, with two seats side-by-side and the open cockpit extended to allow installation of a third (single) seat.

No market existed for private ownership at that time, so the eight aircraft were all built as three-seaters. All the aircraft were initially used by Central Aircraft for joyriding or instruction at Northolt Aerodrome. The fifth aircraft was fitted with a three-float undercarriage. It was used for a week giving joyrides at Southend-on-Sea. It was converted into a landplane later in 1920 and crashed in October 1920.

As the postwar slump continued, some of the aircraft were sold in Belgium and were still operating in 1938. The last survivor was destroyed in the German invasion of Belgium in May 1940.

== Variants ==
- Centaur IV – dual-control version
- Centaur IVA – single-pilot version
- Centaur IVB – float landing gear

== Operators ==
Belgium
United Kingdom

- Central Aircraft Flying School

== Specifications (Centaur IVA) ==
Data from Flight060319

General characteristics

- Crew: 1
- Capacity: 1 or 2 passengers
- Length: 24 ft 9 in (7.54 m)
- Wingspan: 24 ft 2.5 in (7.379 m)
- Empty weight: 900 lb (408 kg)
- Gross weight: 1,400 lb (635 kg)
- Powerplant: 1 × British Anzani 100hp 10-cyl. air-cooled two-row radial piston engine

Performance

- Maximum speed: 75 mph (121 km/h, 65 kn)
- Stall speed: 30 mph (48 km/h, 26 kn)
- Endurance: 3 hours
