= Women's Patriotic Association =

Women's Patriotic Association was an organization based in Newfoundland during World War I. Although women could not fight in The First World War, many chose to knit socks and other comforts and necessary items as an expression of their patriotism and their gratitude for the men fighting overseas. In Newfoundland, the Women's Patriotic Association (WPA) brought together women from all over the colony. The organization's initial purpose was to knit socks but they went on to become associated with the Red Cross and made materials such as pajamas, sweaters, and blankets for the men overseas.

The WPA began in St. John's on August 31, 1914, when the wife of the Governor, Lady Margaret Davidson, called upon the women of Newfoundland to "do their bit" for the war effort. This organization was largely organized in response to a male organization, the Newfoundland Patriotic Association, which was made up of the St. John's mercantile class. At Lady Davidson's request, seven hundred people attended this meeting, which was held in the British Hall. Leading this group were prominent female figures such as Lady Davidson and Lady Isabelle Morris. Over 15,000 women were reported to have been involved in the organization by the end of 1914. By 1917, the WPA could boast that they raised the total sum of $204,219.28 and an estimated $86,249.70 of this was sent as comforts overseas.

WPA leaders played key roles in Newfoundland's civic organizations after the war, and were prominent in the women's suffrage movement as well.
