= 1946 New Year Honours (British Empire Medal) =

British Empire Medal
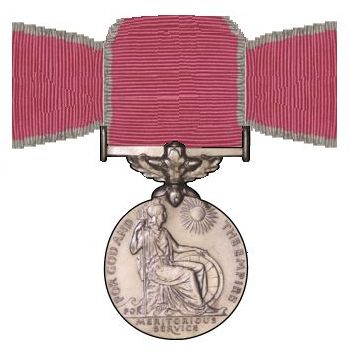
- British Empire Medal on civilian division ladies' ribbon
- Type: Medal affiliated with an order
- Awarded for: Meritorious service
- Country: United Kingdom
- Presented by: Elizabeth II
- Post-nominals: BEM
- Motto: For God and the Empire
- Status: Currently awarded
- Established: 1922–1993; 2012–present
- Final award: 13 June 2015
- Ribbon bars of the Civil and Military BEM

Precedence
- Next (higher): Royal Victorian Medal
- Next (lower): Queen's Police Medal
- Related: Order of the British Empire

This is a list of BEMs awarded in the 1946 New Year Honours

The British Empire Medal (formally British Empire Medal for Meritorious Service) is a British medal awarded for meritorious civil or military service worthy of recognition by the Crown. It may be awarded posthumously, and is granted in recognition of meritorious civil or military service. Recipients are entitled to use the post-nominal letters "BEM".

The honour is divided into civil and military medals in a similar way to the Order of the British Empire. Like the ribbons used for other classes of the Order of the British Empire, the ribbon of the British Empire Medal is rose-pink with pearl-grey edges, with the addition of a pearl-grey central stripe for the military division. While recipients are not technically counted as members of the Order, these medals are nevertheless affiliated with it.

The 1946 New Year Honours were appointments by many of the Commonwealth Realms of King George VI to reward and highlight good works by citizens of those countries, and to celebrate the passing of 1945 and the beginning of 1946. Recommendations for appointments to the Order of the British Empire were made on the nomination of the United Kingdom, the self-governing Dominions of the Empire (later Commonwealth) and the Viceroy of India. They were announced on 1 January 1946 for the United Kingdom, and Dominions, Canada, the Union of South Africa, and New Zealand.

Listed are the 1946 New Year Honours recipients of the British Empire Medal (BEM), divided into military and civil divisions.

== Military Division ==
Rank, name and number are shown.

=== Royal Navy ===
- Regulating Petty Officer Joseph Luis Abraham, T.RNVR.11087.
- Chief Petty Officer Albert Henry Abrahams, D/J.4185.
- Petty Officer Wren Telegraphist Olive Annie Adlington, 20243, WRNS.
- Petty Officer Sheikh Ahmed, 6936, RIN.
- Chief Stoker William Aitken, P/K.60406.
- Marine Anthony Francis Alcoe, CH/X115783.
- Petty Officer Albert William Alderman, P/J.763.
- Chief Petty Officer Stanley Ernest Hill Alexander, D/J.94522.
- Temporary Chief Petty Officer Samuel John Allen, D/JX390251.
- Stoker First Class Diver B. Andrews, 7764, RIN.
- Petty Officer Wren Jessica Maud Andrews, 30769, WRNS.
- Chief Yeoman of Signals Charles William Ashley, C/J.41868.
- Electrical Artificer 3rd Class Arthur Albert Bailey, C/MX65939.
- Chief Petty Officer Cook Thomas Raymond Lillicrop Baker, D/M.37972.
- Petty Officer Rigger Bai Bangura, F.N.1029.
- Chief Petty Officer Jack Richard Holbrook Barker, C/JX137535.
- Temporary Petty Officer Writer Roger Charles Batt, RNVR, C/CHDX118.
- Sick Berth Petty Officer William Edward Baxendale, P/SBR.5212.
- Petty Officer Telegraphist Edgar Harlow Bean, D/J.655.
- Chief Petty Officer Cook Frederick George Bedford, M.14872.
- Acting Engine Room Artificer 4th Class Bernard Berry, C/MX68857.
- Chief Petty Officer (T) William Albert Agate Boniface, P/J.12186.
- Chief Petty Officer Violet Brewer, WRINS.
- Chief Petty Officer Telegraphist Hubert Thomas Brown, P/J.111282.
- Chief Yeoman of Signals Frederick Henry Brown, P/J.13388.
- Yeoman of Signals Norman Brown, D/J.5798.
- Acting Engine Room Artificer Fourth Class Robert Buckley, MX704678.
- Corporal (Temporary) (Acting Temporary Sergeant) Francis Leslie James Burgess, R.M.E.10177.
- Petty Officer Coder William John Burkett, C/JX197943.
- Temporary Sergeant Major Richard Burnett, Ply.19871.
- Electrical Artificer 1st Class Jack Burrows, C/M.35247.
- Chief Engine-room Artificer 1st Class Albert Bush, C/M.1068.
- Chief Stoker Daniel Callaghan, P/KX98872.
- Chief Yeoman of Signals Albert Ernest Callaway, C/J.6814.
- Temporary Petty Officer Writer Desmond Frank Carter, RNVR, D/X56.
- Signalman George Thomas Carter, C/J.14759.
- Sick Berth Attendant James Chambers, P/XBRX7567.
- Master-at-Arms John Godfrey Chandler, P/M.40145.
- Chief Petty Officer Writer George Edwin Chapell, P/MX45961.
- Chief Petty Officer Steward Harry Walter Clark, C/L.11576.
- Engine-room Artificer First Class Robert Clark, RNR, P/37.E.E.
- Chief Petty Officer Alfred Clarke, P/J.238940.
- Petty Officer Edward James Clatworthy, D/JX126450.
- Chief Shipwright Francis Edward Henry Claydon, D/MX53052.
- Chief Wren Marjorie Clough-Ormiston, 7170, WRNS.
- Chief Petty Officer William John Collins, P/237865.
- Temporary Quartermaster Sergeant Instructor Stephen Connell, Ply.21809, Royal Marines.
- Sick Berth Chief Petty Officer William Henry Cooke, D/M.420.
- Chief Stoker Henry John Cooper, P/K.59824.
- Chief Wren Rena Elizabeth Cooper, 8733, WRNS.
- Temporary Sick Berth Petty Officer Louis Costagliola, C/MX94927.
- Temporary Leading Writer John Frederick Cowley, D/MX71540.
- Chief Wren Cook (S) Ada Cox, 9108, WRNS.
- Chief Petty Officer James George Cox, P/J.114.239.
- Chief Wren Nellie Louisa Craig, 12118, WRNS.
- Petty Officer Robert Mark Creed, P/JX215123.
- Chief Motor Mechanic Edmund Charles Crick, P/MX66905.
- Chief Engine-room Artificer Andrew Thomas Crock, DSM, C/MX51378.
- Temporary Petty Officer Albert William Curtis, C/J.103899.
- Chief Petty Officer Writer James Davis, P/MX64137.
- Chief Yeoman of Signals Herbert Victor Dench, C/J.21490.
- Leading Telegraphist Victor Tallentire Dent, P/JX178390.
- Colour Sergeant (Acting Temporary Quartermaster Sergeant) Harry Devine, Ch.24293, Royal Marines.
- Petty Officer Wren Air Mechanic (E) Dorothy Dewhurst, 62352, WRNS.
- Sick Berth Chief Petty Officer Donald Arthur Dick, D/311989.
- Chief Engine-room Artificer 4th Class Eric Vernon Dixon, C/MX120398.
- Chief Shipwright Frederick Cecil Door, D/343515.
- Chief Shipwright Walter John Dowell, C/M.1763.
- Temporary Petty Officer Writer Ewart James Lewis Dukes, C/MX76503.
- Chief Petty Officer Thomas Dunne, D/J.11606.
- Temporary Petty Officer John George Edwards, C/J.112880.
- Able Seaman Bernard Ellis, P/JX393176.
- Chief Petty Officer Writer John Charles William Ellis, P/MX51578.
- Yeoman of Signals Frederick Cox Elms, P/J.23906.
- Stoker 1st Class William George Esplin, C/KX110839.
- Temporary Sergeant Major Edward Joseph Samuel Fahey, Po.21535.
- Chief Wren Dorothy Farmer, 34008, WRNS.
- Shipwright 1st Class Alexander Henry John Finnie, D/M.606.
- Chief Petty Officer Arthur Everitt Fisher, C/J.101046.
- Chief Yeoman of Signals Henry James Fisher, D/J.221677.
- Master-at-Arms Raymond Sidney Fleetwood, P/M.5280.
- Acting Chief Petty Officer Edward George Shreeve Fordham, C/J.115042.
- Petty Officer H. T. Francis, T.124X
- Petty Officer Radio Mechanic Frederick Reginald Freeman, P/MX08024.
- Chief Petty Officer Radio Mechanic Stanley Barrow Garnett, P/MX98741.
- Chief Petty Officer Frederick John Gayette, D/JX230404.
- Engine-room Artificer Third Class Allan Gill, P/MX61993.
- Petty Officer Wren Winifred Clara Godden, 2734, WRNS.
- Chief Motor Mechanic Leslie George Goodliffe, P/MX89332.
- Stoker Petty Officer Alfred Robert Sidney Gould, C/KX77908.
- Colour Sergeant John Graham, Royal Marines, Ply.12477.
- Wren Edith Earton Gordon Grant, 31093, WRNS.
- Chief Yeoman of Signals Robert James Greenacre, D/J.40704.
- Able Seaman Samuel Gresty, P/JX184260.
- Petty Officer Albert William Grimmer, C/JX141096.
- Leading Seaman William George Hackett, C/J.170455.
- Sick Berth Chief Petty Officer Harold Frederick Haddock, C/MX45095.
- Master-at-Arms William George Holyland Haines, DSM, D/MX52073.
- Leading Wren Edith May Harbour, 3848, WRNS
- Temporary Chief Petty Officer Ernest Frank Harris, C/JX142403.
- Chief Petty Officer William Amos Hart, C/KX79454.
- Chief Petty Officer George David Hawkins, P/J.90514.
- Temporary Chief Engine-room Artificer James Arthur Hayward, C/MX48908.
- Temporary Chief Petty Officer Writer Charles Henry George Heath, P/MX57198.
- Petty Officer Cook (O) Ronald Leslie Heath, C/LX20250.
- Chief Petty Officer Frank Bertram Hesp, D/J.10663.
- Chief Electrical Artificer Philip Thomas Hewitt, P/MX59428.
- Master-at-Arms William James Hillson, D/M.37481.
- Acting Chief Petty Officer Robert Johnson Hockey, P/J.109609.
- Chief Motor Mechanic Albert Hockley, P/MX69678.
- Temporary Petty Officer Henry William Frederick Holland, C/JX754445.
- Chief Petty Officer Frederick Roy Hollywood, C/J.98006.
- Air Artificer 4th Class (LO) Cecil Graham Hooker, FAA/FX77132.
- Chief Petty Officer Writer Andrew Wilson Hope, D/MX54749.
- Petty Officer Wren Writer Winifred Mary Hopkins, 20190, WRNS.
- Chief Yeoman of Signals Harry Parker Hoyle, D/226389.
- Chief Petty Officer Telegraphist Albert Edward Hubbard, D/J.9597.
- Chief Petty Officer Alfred Berkenshaw Hubbard, P/J.739.
- Chief Engine-room Artificer Albert Edward Hughes, C/MX54670.
- Chief Petty Officer Writer Wyndham Hughes, D/MX49438.
- Petty Officer Harry Arthur Ernest Human, C/JX136023.
- Coder Leslie James Humphreys, D/JX294690.
- Sailmaker Robert Charlie Hunter, P/J.113055.
- Yeoman of Signals George Hunton, C/JX134303
- Acting Sergeant-Major Thomas Edward Hutchinson, Ch/X1542.
- Chief Petty Officer Boatswain George Conway Ingledew, RTP/R.238927.
- Chief Petty Officer Telegraphist Norman Leslie Charles Ingram, D/JX129137.
- Chief Petty Officer Frederick George Jackson, C/JX55241.
- Engine-room Artificer First Class Donald Herbert Jarrett, P/MX47040.
- Sergeant-Major Ernest George Alner Jarvis, Royal Marines.
- Marine Eric Jepson, Po/X116362.
- Chief Shipwright John Henry John, C/342931.
- Boatswain James Christopher Johnson (T.124).
- Engine-room Artificer Second Class (now Temporary Sub-Lieutenant (E)) Cyril Ralph Jones, C/MX47958.
- Corporal (Temporary) (Acting Temporary Sergeant) David Jones, 11600, R.M.E.
- Chief Wren Mabel Eleanor Jones, 13620, WRNS
- Petty Officer Radio-Mechanic John Kennedy, P/MX116767.
- Colour Sergeant John Richard King, Ch/16673.
- Petty Officer Stanley David Kirby, C/SSX21819.
- Chief Petty Officer Writer Sydney Alexander Kirkman, C/MX54751.
- Chief Engine-room Artificer Frank Lucas, P/M.18550.
- Chief Petty Officer Writer Frederick Robert Lowry, C/MX55452.
- Petty Officer Charles Priaulx Lihou, R/JX174873.
- Chief Petty Officer Telegraphist John Levick, P/J.5160.
- Stores Petty Officer Arthur Frederick Labrum, C/MX674105.
- Joiner 3rd Class Alexander Macintosh, P/MX78608.
- Petty Officer Radio Mechanic Andrew Miller McDonald, P/MX125082.
- Acting Sergeant Major George Ernest Mann, Royal Marines, Po.21738.
- Petty Officer Wren Marjorie Elizabeth Wortley Marle, 1874, WRNS.
- Engine-room Artificer 4th Class Heremen Marsden, D/MX102895.
- Petty Officer Hanwell McCoy, T.RNVR.2181.
- Sick Berth Attendant Joseph McCutcheon, C/MX66872.
- Chief Petty Officer William James McFaul, P/JX163338.
- Chief Petty Officer Richard McIlwain, D/JX135802.
- Master-at-Arms Henry James Miles, P/MX59437.
- Chief Engine-room Artificer Alfred John Stoneman Milford, D/272381.
- Petty Officer Motor Mechanic Alfred Reginald Millard, C/MX623706.
- Chief Yeoman of Signals Frederick James Millard, P/J.31780.
- Colour Sergeant Arthur Charles Edwin Milne, Royal Marines, Po.19150.
- Chief Petty Officer Bertie Milton, C/J.25116.
- Chief Petty Officer Patrick Monaghan, D/J.102294.
- Leading Writer Herbert Ernest Moore, P/MX673521.
- Chief Petty Officer Charles Drayton Morris, P/J.26718.
- Air Artificer Fourth Class David Mack Muir, FAA/FX77290.
- Sukhani Abu Sultan Abdul Mutalib, 74473, RIN.
- Leading Seaman Purnell James Nelson, T.RNVR, 2479X
- Chief Petty Officer Writer George Raymond Neville, C/MX53551.
- Stores Chief Petty Officer James George Norfolk, C/MX52737.
- Chief Petty Officer Writer Claude Montague Norton, C/M.26647.
- Stores Chief Petty Officer Dennis Jack Oldham, C/M.39257.
- Chief Engine-room Artificer Fourth Class Ernest George Osgood, P/M.13613.
- Colour Sergeant (Acting Company Sergeant-Major) Ronald Christopher Fred Palmer, Po.X526, Royal Marines.
- Leading Writer Wilfrid Lawrence Paris, P/MX86514.
- Chief Stoker Harold Norman Parker, C/K.63253.
- Master-at-Arms John George Parnham, C/M.40025.
- Stores Chief Petty Officer Herbert Walter Parr, C/M.37874.
- Yeoman of Signals Lawrence Pattison, DSM, P/JX127534.
- Sergeant (Acting Temporary Company Sergeant-Major) Albert William Pegler, Po.217127, Royal Marines.
- Chief Engine-room Artificer Tames Petch, C/M.5483.
- Chief Petty Officer Frederick Pett, P/J.18211.
- Master-at-Arms Francis James Phillips, C/M.39981.
- Petty Officer Wren Helen Phillis, 5555, WRNS.
- Leading Writer Sydney Pickard, C/MX66168.
- Chief Engine-room Artificer George Moreton Pinfold, C/M.593.
- Chief Petty Officer Telegraphist George Albert Plested, C/JX170440.
- Leading Signalman John Henry Potter, P/JX152143.
- Temporary Leading Telegraphist Frederick James Cyril Price, C/J.103975.
- Sick Berth Chief Petty Officer Thomas Price, C/M.822.
- Chief Stoker Leslie Ralph Prowting, P/K.59983.
- Chief Petty Officer Frederick George Quested, DSM, C/J.93236.
- Chief Shipwright Alan Edgar Raine, C/MX46731.
- Chief Petty Officer George Tom Ramsdale, D/227620.
- Master-at-Arms Frederick Randall, C/239967.
- Leading Seaman Ronald Godfrey Ready, P/JX169071.
- Leading Stoker Percy George Reeves, D/KX117326.
- Chief Petty Officer John Alfred Reynolds, C/J.96881.
- Chief Petty Officer Telegraphist James Riddell, C/JX132853.
- Colour Sergeant (Acting Temporary Quartermaster Sergeant Instructor) James Henry Ripley, Po.16861, Royal Marines.
- Chief Petty Officer Ernest Roberts, D/J.107059.
- Chief Petty Officer Walter Charles Roberts, P/J.21039.
- Chief Mechanician Percy William Russell, P/KX78101.
- Petty Officer Eric Lewin Salter, P/J.91924.
- Chief Wren Annie Beatrice Louise Sampson, 19042, WRNS.
- Chief Engine-room Artificer Leslie Reginald Chief Samways, C/M.38844.
- Chief Petty Officer William Arthur Savage, DSM, P/J.109633.
- Chief Petty Officer Thomas Henry Heath Shenton, C/J.6747.
- Petty Officer Clement Richard Short, P/JX126694.
- Chief Petty Officer Air Mechanic (A) Jack Simmons, FAA/FX76883.
- Temporary Chief Petty Officer Writer Seymour Simmons, C/MX51555.
- Yeoman of Signals James Alexander Simpson, C/J.105214.
- Chief Petty Officer Redvers Buller Sims, C/J.41710.
- Chief Wren Emily Louisa Skinner, 5707, WRNS.
- Chief Joiner Albert Edward Victor Slade, P/M.17266.
- Shipwright 3rd Class David Owen Smith, D/MX63782.
- Chief Wren Edna June Smith, 3330, WRNS.
- Temporary Regulating Petty Officer Henry Reuben Smith, P/M.40264.
- Sergeant (Temporary) William John Smith, Royal Marines, Ply/X121275(T).
- Acting Leading Seaman Anthony Smurthwaite, C/JX231926.
- Petty Officer Telegraphist Ernest William.Peter Stankiste, C/JX150785.
- Chief Engine-room Artificer Edgar Stephens, D/M.132313.
- Chief Stoker William Henry Stevens, D/K.17808.
- Sick Berth Chief Petty Officer Ernest John Stokes, D/MX47738.
- Chief Engine-room Artificer Lionel Ernest Sutlow P/MX48776.
- Temporary Chief Petty Officer Samuel Ernest Sweet, C/JX127897.
- Chief Petty Officer Telegraphist John Dixon Swinney, D/J.28590.
- Electrical Artificer 1st Class Stanley George Symonds, D/BD/71.
- Engine-room Artificer Second Class Frederick Alan Taylor, D/MX52679.
- Petty Officer John Richard Taylor, C/JX190207.
- Sick Berth Petty Officer William Taylor, RNASBR./3723.
- Chief Petty Officer Telegraphist Thomas John Teale, C/J.61008.
- Chief Petty Officer William James Thomas, P/J.16419.
- Ship Mechanic 4th Class Ronald Thompson, C/MX507806.
- Chief Wren Annie West Thomson, 3085, WRNS.
- Leading Signalman William Albert Thorne P/JX162211.
- Master-at-Arms Clifford George Thorogood, C/M.39913.
- Stores Chief Petty Officer Albert William Town, C/MX45877.
- Chief Petty Officer Writer Leslie Alfred John Treby, D/MX51064.
- Temporary Stores Chief Petty Officer Henry Arthur Trelvelyan, P/MX50657.
- Chief Wren Dora Irene May Tucker, 911, WRNS.
- Stoker 1st Class Rueben Tunnicliffe, P/KX515728.
- Petty Officer Air Mechanic (A) Kenneth Turner, FAA/FX79136.
- Petty Officer Writer Edwin Charles Uphill, P/MX50626.
- Chief Petty Officer Writer William John Waghorn P/M.38256.
- Sergeant (Acting Temporary Company Sergeant Major) Henry Walker, Ch.X1288, Royal Marines.
- Chief Yeoman of Signals Thomas Wallace, C.226669.
- Chief Petty Officer Writer Alfred William Pattison Walsh, P/MX45727.
- Acting Petty Officer Telegraphist Alan Wark, C/JX308850.
- Chief Wren Blanche Watson, 8004, WRNS.
- Sick Berth Chief Petty Officer Ronald Arthur Watson, C/M.5188.
- Chief Engine-room Artificer Charles Seymore Watts, P/MX47826.
- Chief Petty Officer William Thomas Webb, C/J.75804.
- Stores Petty Officer Leonard Edward Wells, C/MX61241.
- Chief Petty Officer Charles William Westbrook, DSM, P/J.25183.
- Chief Wren Olive Wheeler, 949, WRNS.
- Engine-room Artificer 3rd Class George William Joseph Whiffing, D/MX67255.
- Petty Officer Wren Muriel Whitney, 4048, WRNS.
- Chief Petty Officer Writer Edward Joseph Wicks, C/MX46804.
- Chief Petty Officer John Wilks, D/236609.
- Engine-room Artificer 3rd Class Stanley Williams D/MX66523.
- Colour Sergeant (Acting Sergeant Major) Eric Albert Benjamin Wood, Ch/X1135.
- Petty Officer Albert Cecil Woodward, D/J.114030.
- Stores Petty Officer Leonard George Worner, D/MX71606.
- Temporary Sergeant Major Cairo James Bert Young, Ply/X20804.
- Chief Petty Officer Lorenzo Zarb, Malta E/J.53670.

=== Army ===
- 7922502 Squadron Quartermaster-Sergeant John Abraham, Royal Armoured Corps.
- ISC/7179 Lance-Naik Adalat Hussain Shah, Indian Signal Corps.
- 1929781 Staff-Sergeant Thomas Leslie Adshead, Corps of Royal Engineers.
- Warrant Officer Class I Aibu Chikwenga, The King's African Rifles.
- 1444346 Sergeant Claude Victor Airey, Royal Regiment of Artillery.
- 13103620 Colour Sergeant (acting) George Airth, Pioneer Corps.
- S/75375 Staff-Sergeant Arthur Edward Aldworth, Royal Army Service Corps.
- T/199968 Sergeant Thomas Robert Allen, Royal Army Service Corps.
- 1927691 Sergeant Robert William Allsop, Corps of Royal Engineers.
- 2341306 Lance-Sergeant (acting) Harold William James Anderson, Royal Corps of Signals.
- S/6091736 Sergeant Richard Henry Anderson, Royal Army Service Corps.
- W/46040 Private Marjorie Andrews, Auxiliary Territorial Service.
- 5617052 Corporal Reginald Francis Angel, Corps of Royal Engineers.
- 4392642 Sergeant William Richard Armstrong, The Green Howards (Alexandra, Princess of Wales's Own Yorkshire Regiment).
- 871904 Gunner Albert Charles Atkins, Royal Regiment of Artillery.
- 2126918 Lance-Corporal (acting) Edgar Atkinson, Corps of Royal Engineers.
- 7642961 Staff-Sergeant George Storey Atkinson, Royal Electrical and Mechanical Engineers.
- 1895245 Sergeant Ronald Atkinson, Corps of Royal Engineers.
- 10533960 Staff-Sergeant Aubrey Byron Austin, Royal Electrical and Mechanical Engineers.
- 7641103 Staff-Sergeant Thomas Leslie Axford, Corps of Royal Engineers.
- 5384693 Sergeant William Bernard Ayres, The Oxfordshire and Buckinghamshire Light Infantry.
- 1468487 Battery Quartermaster-Sergeant Arthur Robert Baddeley, Royal Regiment of Artillery.
- W/21266 Sergeant Marjorie Emmeline Baggot, Auxiliary Territorial Service.
- 7882446 Sergeant David Baird, Royal Armoured Corps.
- 5829956 Corporal Douglas Haig Baker, Royal Electrical and Mechanical Engineers.
- 7636419 Staff-Sergeant Ernest Frederick Baker, Royal Army Ordnance Corps.
- 4984780 Staff-Sergeant Edward William Baker, Corps of Royal Engineers.
- 3964332 Corporal John Baldwin, Royal Corps of Signals.
- W/32591 Sergeant Helen Sarah Balfe, Auxiliary Territorial Service.
- 2589802 Sergeant William Ball, Royal Corps of Signals.
- S/149983 Warrant Officer Class I (acting) William Charles Guy Balls, Royal Army Service Corps.
- NA/11250 (Warrant Officer Class I (acting) Abanda Banjim, Royal West African Frontier Force.
- W/179240 Lance-Corporal (acting) Gertrude Annie Banks, Auxiliary Territorial Service.
- WAC/4723 Staff-Sergeant Cecile Elsie Lynch Baptiste, Women's Auxiliary Corps (India).
- 1086500 Sergeant Thomas Barker, Royal Regiment of Artillery.
- 2575508 Bombardier Edward John Barlow, Royal Regiment of Artillery.
- S/217057 Staff-Sergeant Reginald William Carlile Barnes, Royal Army Service Corps.
- 1063929 Sergeant Phillip Henry Barnett, Royal Army Veterinary Corps.
- 3656701 Sergeant William Barratt, Army Air Corps.
- 2327196 Sergeant Herman Platt Battye, Royal Corps of Signals.
- 10565265 Corporal Godfrey John Baynes, Royal Army Ordnance Corps.
- 10537422 Warrant Officer Class II (acting) Walter Rhys Beard, Royal Army Ordnance Corps.
- 2363030 Warrant Officer Class II (acting) Victor Beare, Royal Corps of Signals.
- 7618413 Staff-Sergeant William Belcher, Royal Army Ordnance Corps.
- 2323665 Sergeant Elding Bell, Royal Corps of Signals.
- 7259695 Staff-Sergeant Reginald William Bell, Royal Army Medical Corps.
- 7590057 Craftsman John Alfred Belton, Royal Electrical and Mechanical Engineers.
- 1431680 Warrant Officer Class II (acting) Cyril Baron Benjamin, Intelligence Corps.
- W/52809 Sergeant Monica May Besant, Auxiliary Territorial Service.
- 2057809 Warrant Officer Class II (acting) Samuel Norman Beswarick, Royal Regiment of Artillery.
- 2128791 Sergeant (acting) Herbert Bewley, Corps of Royal Engineers.
- 13056600 Sergeant Alfred Stanley Biggs, Pioneer Corps.
- 14227185 Corporal Henry Frederick Bingham, Corps of Royal Engineers.
- 1110713 Sergeant William James Binny, Royal Regiment of Artillery.
- 7689126 Corporal David Birch, Corps of Military Police.
- 1879859 Staff-Sergeant Walter Frederick Bird, Army Physical Training Corps.
- W/47146 Staff-Sergeant Ivy Lilian May Blackman, Auxiliary Territorial Service.
- 6391895 Sergeant Thomas Blades, Royal Corps of Signals.
- T/1888407 Staff-Sergeant Robert Blake, Royal Army Service Corps.
- 44154 Company Quartermaster-Sergeant William Blakely, The North Staffordshire Regiment (The Prince of Wales's).
- 2323091 Sergeant Leslie Henry Bloom, Royal Corps of Signals.
- 7359886 Warrant Officer Class II (acting) Eric Leslie Boardman, Royal Army Medical Corps.
- 746597 Sergeant Gilbert Frederick Boarer, Royal Regiment of Artillery.
- 2320581 Warrant Officer Class II (acting) John Boldison, Royal Corps of Signals.
- 2005222 Staff-Sergeant Leslie Boot, Corps of Royal Engineers.
- 5679117 Company Quartermaster-Sergeant Eric Lambert Booth, The Somerset Light Infantry (Prince Albert's).
- 1697054 Staff-Sergeant Dennis Alfred Boothman, Royal Regiment of Artillery.
- 7385103 Staff-Sergeant Stanley Bostock, Royal Army Medical Corps.
- 4857967 Sergeant Edward Bowes, The Leicestershire Regiment.
- 420819 Squadron Quartermaster-Sergeant Edward Ernest George Bowles, 1st Royal Gloucestershire Hussars, Royal Armoured Corps.
- S/2038163 Staff-Sergeant Henry George Bowles, Royal Army Service Corps.
- 2935441 Company Quartermaster-Sergeant James Lyall Wallace Boyd, The Queen's Own Cameron Highlanders.
- S/3605150 Staff-Sergeant (acting) Frederick Ernest Boyle, Royal Army Service Corps.
- 1990980 Sergeant John Brabin, GM, Corps of Royal Engineers.
- 5678271 Sergeant (acting) Victor Verdun Jack Brake, Pioneer Corps.
- 4457388 Sergeant Kenneth Moirland Bramwell, The Durham Light Infantry.
- 1882150 Staff-Sergeant John Eric Breese, Corps of Royal Engineers.
- 1452400 Battery Quartermaster-Sergeant Alfred John Breeze, Royal Regiment of Artillery.
- 4619707 Lance-Corporal (acting) Charles Henry Brewster, The Border Regiment.
- 1440085 Sergeant David Charles Brice, Royal Corps of Signals.
- 14500550 Sergeant Edward Charles Brice, The Worcestershire Regiment.
- 13066955 Sergeant (acting) Leonard Ernest Brightwell, Pioneer Corps.
- 2880291 Lance-Corporal (acting) George Broadley, Corps of Military Police.
- S/1879623 Warrant Officer Class II (acting) Hume Broadway, Royal Army Service Corps.
- W/32559 Staff-Sergeant Helen Emily Mary Brocks, Auxiliary Territorial Service.
- 5188020 Lance-Sergeant Ernest Frank William Brooks, The Gloucestershire Regiment.
- S/7925144 Staff-Sergeant (acting) Edward Leslie Brown, Royal Army Service Corps.
- 7890233 Sergeant Francis Brown, Royal Armoured Corps.
- 2582169 Corporal Thomas Brown, Royal Corps of Signals.
- 1452048 Sergeant William Brown, Royal Regiment of Artillery.
- 2193903 Lance-Sergeant (acting) William Brown, Corps of Royal Engineers.
- 621096 Corporal Eleanor Francis Bruford, Voluntary Aid Detachment.
- 7630446 Company Quartermaster-Sergeant (acting) Reginald Walter Bryant, Royal Army Ordnance Corps.
- 3781062 Corporal Wilfred Buckley, Royal Armoured Corps.
- 315972 Sergeant John Buffery, Royal Armoured Corps.
- Sergeant Bunga, British Solomon Islands Defence Force.
- 11406518 Sergeant Ronald Thomas Bunnage, Royal Regiment of Artillery.
- 324495 Warrant Officer Class II (acting) Henry Jack Burchell, Corps of Royal Engineers.
- 14393043 Sergeant John Robinson Burgess, Corps of Military Police.
- 14616851 Lance-Corporal (acting) James Charles Burnham, Corps of Royal Engineers.
- 1832022 Sergeant Horace Cyril Burton, Royal Regiment of Artillery.
- S/14249306 Private Herbert Arthur Bush, Royal Army Service Corps.
- 1608903 Sergeant (acting) Bertie Bushell, Royal Regiment of Artillery.
- 4681297 Sergeant Rowland Butler, Pioneer Corps.
- 2592613 Company Quartermaster-Sergeant Alan Butterworth, East African Signal Corps.
- 1946397 Warrant Officer Class II (acting) Herman Leslie Cabourn, Corps of Royal Engineers.
- 10547615 Sergeant (acting) Frederick William George Calderhead, Royal Army Ordnance Corps.
- 7914231 Corporal John Cochrane Cameron, Royal Tank Regiment, Royal Armoured Corps.
- 4077192 Gunner Claud Henry Victor Carr, Royal Regiment of Artillery.
- 7690221 Corporal John George Carr, Corps of Military Police.
- 7358753 Sergeant Arthur Richard Carter, Royal Army Medical Corps.
- 14537884 Sapper Henry Charles Carter, Corps of Royal Engineers.
- W/16262 Sergeant Madeleine Carter, Auxiliary Territorial Service.
- 1493663 Sergeant Robert Burns Carvel, Royal Regiment of Artillery.
- 1810047 Gunner John Cunningham Castle, Royal Regiment of Artillery.
- 5826851 Sergeant Russell John Catling, The Suffolk Regiment.
- 7625356 Staff-Sergeant Harry Bernard Caudle, Royal Electrical and Mechanical Engineers.
- 549292 Sergeant Sidney Herbert Causebrook, 13th/18th Royal Hussars (Queen Mary's Own), Royal Armoured Corps.
- 41988218 Sergeant Frank Chadderton, The Royal Welch Fusiliers.
- S/136050 Corporal Frank Chadwick, Royal Army Service Corps.
- 6016966 Sergeant Ronald Ernest Chambers, The Essex Regiment.
- 7600712 Warrant Officer Class II (acting) Frederick Champion, Royal Electrical and Mechanical Engineers.
- 502078 Staff-Sergeant (acting) Constance May Chapman, Voluntary Aid Detachment.
- S/235934 Staff-Sergeant (acting) Sydney George Chapman, Royal Army Service Corps.
- 2568098 Corporal William Herbert Chapman, Royal Army Medical Corps.
- W/133415 Lance-Corporal Jessie Rose Chelsom, Auxiliary Territorial Service.
- 8/215864 Staff-Sergeant Rosslyne Spencer Chesney, Royal Army Service Corps.
- 7653279 Sergeant John Charles Chittick, Royal Army Ordnance Corps.
- 907482 Lance-Bombardier (acting) Joseph Clark, Royal Regiment of Artillery.
- 1517834 Sergeant Joseph William Clark, Royal Regiment of Artillery.
- S/10714125 Sergeant Hugh Thurston Clarke, Royal Army Service Corps.
- 7658502 Staff-Sergeant David Clegg, Royal Army Pay Corps.
- 2144292 Sergeant Arthur Lewis Clements, Corps of Royal Engineers.
- 10530182 Corporal Charles William Clements, Royal Army Ordnance Corps.
- 1601301 Lance-Corporal John Edward Cobb, Corps of Royal Engineers.
- 3591256 Lance-Corporal William Henry Cobb, The Border Regiment.
- 2121894 Corporal Duncan Cochrane, Corps of Royal Engineers.
- 1926346 Sergeant Stephen Norman Codling, Corps of Royal Engineers.
- 4462292 Sergeant Thomas George William Porter Coffin, The Durham Light Infantry.
- 1543332 Battery Quartermaster Sergeant Edwin Charles Cole, Royal Regiment of Artillery.
- T/166262 Lance-Corporal Thomas Seymour Cole, Royal Army Service Corps.
- 5885981 Company Quartermaster Sergeant Arthur Pensom Colley, The Northamptonshire Regiment.
- 5/112513 Corporal Frederick Heaton Copier, Royal Army Service Corps.
- 14619569 Lance-Corporal Alfred John Collins, Corps of Royal Engineers.
- 14614036 Lance-Corporal John Colpitts, Corps of Royal Engineers.
- 7632761 Staff-Sergeant Frank Cecil Consterdine, Royal Army Ordnance Corps.
- 7580659 Staff-Sergeant Edward Conway, Royal Army Ordnance Corps.
- 2004829 Sapper Ronald Cooke, Corps of Royal Engineers.
- 7354468 Warrant Officer Class II (acting) Thomas Weston Cooling, Royal Army Medical Corps.
- W/55081 Sergeant Jane Corfield, Auxiliary Territorial Service.
- 13805072 Corporal Aldo Cosomati, Corps of Royal Engineers.
- 10570939 Sergeant George Edward Cottol, Royal Army Ordnance Corps.
- 5376656 Sergeant Henry William Cove, Royal Regiment of Artillery.
- 4692206 Corporal Leslie Cowgill, Corps of Royal Engineers.
- 2317231 Sergeant George William Coxon, Royal Corps of Signals.
- 4208452 Sergeant John Charles Crabbe, The Royal Welch Fusiliers.
- S/2590278 Staff-Sergeant George Craig, Royal Army Service Corps.
- 4614961 Sergeant Joseph Crane, Corps of Royal Engineers.
- 14379194 Private Herbert Henry Crannage, Royal Army Medical Corps.
- 4196476 Company Quartermaster-Sergeant Arthur James Crilley, The Royal Welch Fusiliers.
- 13018777 Sergeant James Crockford, Pioneer Corps.
- 2333688 Sergeant Leonard Ernest Cross, Royal Corps of Signals.
- 7349597 Corporal Charles Arthur Crowe, Royal Army Medical Corps.
- T/207388 Corporal Eric Edwin Cuckney, Royal Army Service Corps.
- 2331699 Sergeant Gordon Currie, Royal Corps of Signals.
- W/285964 Private Florence Alexandra Cuthbertson, Auxiliary Territorial Service.
- 2144670 Sergeant Harry John Dadd, Corps of Royal Engineers.
- S/2824180 Sergeant Robert Dalglish, Royal Army Service Corps.
- 2599646 Sergeant Arthur Cecil Dalrymple, Royal Army Service Corps, attached Indian Army Corps of Clerks.
- 38905 Havildar Damodar Dass, MM, Indian Artillery.
- S/10707395 Sergeant Montague Daniels, Royal Army Service Corps.
- 841571 Warrant Officer Class II (acting) John Henry Darey, Royal Army Medical Corps.
- 5551 Sergeant Cecil Herbert Davids, Burma Auxiliary Force.
- 4118314 Company Quartermaster-Sergeant (acting) Charles Henry Davies, Corps of Royal Engineers.
- 1864020 Staff-Sergeant Elisha William Faithful Davies, Royal Army Pay Corps.
- 5105027 Sergeant Phillip Davies, The Royal Warwickshire Regiment.
- 1883997 Staff-Sergeant William Davies, Corps of Royal Engineers.
- W/13937 Staff-Sergeant (acting) Edith Lydia Davis, Auxiliary Territorial Service.
- 7358085 Sergeant Harold Leslie Davis, Royal Army Medical Corps.
- 1418426 Staff-Sergeant George Frederick Walter Dawson, Royal Army Pay 'Corps.
- S/115058 Staff-Sergeant Ernest Arthur Day, Royal Army Service Corps.
- S/203289 Staff-Sergeant William David Deary, Royal Army Service Corps.
- 2001248 Lance-Sergeant Major William Debney, Corps of Royal Engineers.
- 1422493 Sergeant Leonard Charles Dempster, Royal Regiment of Artillery.
- 7372107 Warrant Officer Class II (acting) Ronald John Denney, Royal Army Medical Corps.
- 1462870 Sergeant George Richard Dennis, Royal Regiment of Artillery.
- 21373I7 Staff-Sergeant Frederick John Dettmar, Corps of Royal Engineers.
- 2063750 Sergeant William Leonard Dewhirst, Pioneer Corps.
- 7612488 Warrant Officer Class II (acting) Kenneth Frederick Dexter, Royal Army Ordnance Corps.
- 7636211 Sergeant Frederick William Dickens, Royal Army Ordnance Corps.
- 855759 Sergeant (acting) Charles Dickinson, Corps of Royal Engineers.
- 4975705 Sergeant George Dicks, The Sherwood Foresters (Nottinghamshire and Derbyshire Regiment).
- 2374798 Sergeant Clifford Frank Dickson, Royal Corps of Signals.
- 1050418 Sergeant Harry Dixey, Royal Regiment of Artillery.
- S/1082758 Sergeant Francis Glyndon Dobbs, Royal Army Service Corps.
- S/189235 Warrant Officer Class I (acting) David Doig, Royal Army Service Corps.
- 7261381 Staff-Sergeant Frank Vincent Donegan, Royal Army Medical Corps.
- 1888725 Lance-Sergeant Richard Dorran, Corps of Royal Engineers.
- 7594842 Staff-Sergeant Henry Josiah Doswell, Royal Electrical and Mechanical Engineers.
- 2339325 Sergeant Albert Thomas Doughty, Royal Corps of Signals.
- 7622480 Corporal Norman Lewis Douglas, Royal Electrical and Mechanical Engineers.
- 1927752 Sergeant Percy Robert Douglas, Corps of Royal Engineers.
- 14614051 Sergeant Hugh Craig Dowal, Royal Army Ordnance Corps.
- W/25622 Staff-Sergeant Mary Elizabeth Edgar, Auxiliary Territorial Service.
- 14316091 Corporal (acting) Tom Edyvean, Royal Army Ordnance Corps.
- 2656238 Sergeant Thomas Henry Edwards, Corps of Military Police.
- W/22556 Staff-Sergeant Gertrude Eileen Egan, Auxiliary Territorial Service.
- 1485320 Lance-Bombardier John Egan, Royal Regiment of Artillery.
- S/283016 Sergeant Walter Reginald Ellin, Royal Army Service Corps.
- 13059823 Corporal George Elliott, Pioneer Corps.
- 4795993 Sergeant Vernon Hugh Elmes, Royal Regiment of Artillery.
- 14281217 Lance-Corporal Cyril Newman Emberson, Royal Armoured Corps.
- 13022092 Corporal Harold Erickson, Pioneer Corps.
- T/113231 Lance-Corporal Edward James Evans, Royal Army Service Corps.
- 577581V Corporal (temporary) George Desmond Evans, South African Forces.
- 598838V Sergeant Moshe Evenary, South African Forces.
- GDF/822 Battery Quartermaster-Sergeant Joseph Lawrence Fabre, Gibraltar Defence Force.
- S/108404 Staff-Sergeant Gavin Craig Fairbairn, Royal Army Service Corps.
- 547803 Squadron Quartermaster-Sergeant Philip Stanley Fancott, The Warwickshire Yeomanry, Royal Armoured Corps.
- 10544155 Sergeant William Frederick Fathers, Royal Army Ordnance Corps.
- W/32035 Sergeant (acting) Lena Faulkner, Auxiliary Territorial Service.
- S/75189 Staff-Sergeant William Ernest Faulkner, Royal Army Service Corps.
- S/69197 Staff-Sergeant Jack Edward Fawcett, Royal Army Service Corps.
- 7653346 Sergeant Rodney Fawcett, Royal Army Ordnance Corps.
- S/204285 Sergeant Eric Fazakerley, Royal Army Service Corps.
- S/103446 Staff-Sergeant John Blakeway Fearnley, Royal Army Service Corps.
- 2732825 Guardsman James Fenwick, Welsh Guards.
- 108754 Staff-Sergeant John Alexander Ferguson, Royal Electrical and Mechanical Engineers.
- 7677098 Warrant Officer Class II (acting) Archibald Napier Fergusson, Royal Army Pay Corps.
- 1713336 Lance-Sergeant Walter Ferreniea, Royal Regiment of Artillery.
- 2387514 Sergeant (acting) Walter Alfred Field, Pioneer Corps.
- W/51391 Staff-Sergeant Shamrock Imelda Filose, Auxiliary Territorial Service.
- 7612511 Sergeant Maurice Fineberg, Royal Army Ordnance Corps.
- 271180 Staff-Sergeant Harry Fineman, Royal Electrical and Mechanical Engineers.
- 10581196 Staff-Sergeant James Henry Finlayson, Royal Army Ordnance Corps.
- S/136113 Warrant Officer Class II (acting) Alexander Fish, Royal Army Service Corps.
- S/4755603 Staff-Sergeant John Arthur Fisher, Royal Army Service Corps.
- 1915236 Sergeant Raymond Fisher, Corps of Royal Engineers.
- 3383421 Sergeant Herbert Fitton, Army Catering Corps.
- 10536979 Corporal Charles Alfred Fitzgibbon, Royal Army Ordnance Corps.
- 2601763 Sergeant (acting) Charles Fletcher, Royal Corps of Signals.
- 897685 Staff-Sergeant James Ford, Royal Regiment of Artillery.
- 6849347 Sergeant Ronald George Forgan, The Middlesex Regiment (Duke of Cambridge's Own).
- S/6462795 Warrant Officer Class II (acting) Robert Brown Forrest, Royal Army Service Corps.
- 8/2822693 Warrant Officer Class II (acting) Allan Forsyth, Royal Army Service Corps.
- 1153730 Gunner Ernest Herbert Foster, Royal Regiment of Artillery.
- 7607838 Sergeant William John Foster, Royal Electrical and Mechanical Engineers.
- W/5761 Staff-Sergeant Jean Helen Foulis, Auxiliary Territorial Service.
- 1898070 Sergeant Nelson Alfred Fox, Corps of Royal Engineers.
- 2812319 Sergeant Hugh Andrew Fraser, The Seaforth Highlanders (Ross-shire Buffs, The Duke of Albany's).
- 6206545 Corporal John Albert French, The Middlesex Regiment (Duke of Cambridge's Own).
- 1530489 Battery Quartermaster-Sergeant Joseph John French, Royal Regiment of Artillery.
- 5668141 Sergeant Arthur John Froggatt, Corps of Royal Engineers.
- 2067949 Lance-Sergeant Maurice James Edwin Fuche, Royal Regiment of Artillery.
- W/45786 Corporal Jessie Mary Fulford, Auxiliary Territorial Service.
- 2131833 Driver John Edward Gair, Corps of Royal Engineers.
- 2369175 Sergeant Mervyn Albert Gale, Royal Corps of Signals.
- 7598295 Sergeant Peter Nofris Gallally, Royal Electrical and Mechanical Engineers.
- 7593122 Sergeant Jackson Galley, Royal Army Ordnance Corps.
- S/153562 Staff-Sergeant Archie Gallon, Royal Army Service Corps.
- 108515 Staff-Sergeant Oliver James Gamm, Royal Electrical and Mechanical Engineers.
- W/15215 Staff-Sergeant Beatrice Gardiner, Auxiliary Territorial Service.
- 7653000 Staff-Sergeant Thomas James Garner, Royal Army Ordnance Corps.
- W/81696 Sergeant Dorothy May Gascoigne, Auxiliary Territorial Service.
- 1125548 Sergeant Vivian Henry Sylvanus Gathergood, Royal Regiment of Artillery.
- S/10668387 Lance Corporal Samuel William Geaves, Royal Army Service Corps.
- 4029883 Staff-Sergeant Richard Gee, Corps of Royal Engineers.
- 882146 Warrant Officer- Class II (acting) Norman Stewart Gentles, Royal Regiment of Artillery.
- ISC/55342 Signalman Ghulam Hussain, Indian Signal Corps.
- 6289786 Sergeant Robert Lionel Gibbs, The Buffs (Royal East Kent Regiment).
- S/202619 Staff-Sergeant Edwin Arthur Gibson, Royal Army Service Corps.
- 7871315 Squadron Quartermaster-Sergeant George Giles, 2nd Lothians and Border Yeomanry, Royal Armoured Corps.
- 4344298 Sergeant Thomas Gill, The East Yorkshire Regiment (The Duke of York's Own).
- 555840 Sergeant Arthur Robert Gillett, Royal Armoured Corps.
- 7622900 Sergeant William Henry Girdlestone, Royal Army Ordnance Corps.
- 863023 Warrant Officer Class II (acting) Stephen Henry Glossop, Army Physical Training Corps.
- W/61814 Sergeant Edna Golding, Auxiliary Territorial Service.
- 6844900 Corporal Harry Golding, Corps of Royal Engineers.
- 2008132 Lance-Corporal Thomas John Goodall, Corps of Royal Engineers.
- 7603316 Staff-Sergeant Alexander Albert Gooding, Royal Army Ofdnance Corps.
- 986330 Staff-Sergeant John William Goodman, Royal Regiment of Artillery.
- 1600424 Gunner Alwyn Goodwin, Royal Regiment of Artillery.
- 7655237 Warrant Officer Class II (acting) Allen Begg Gordon, Royal Army Ordnance Corps, attached Indian Army Ordnance Corps.
- 899409 Sergeant John Thomas Gorman, Royal Regiment of Artillery.
- W/185323 Staff-Sergeant Rose Lucy Gough, Auxilitary Territorial Service.
- 390107 Band Sergeant Walter Edward Ross Gower, Scots Guards.
- 2128055 Sapper William Dugdale Grant, Corps of Royal Engineers.
- S/2007709 Staff-Sergeant Albert Cecil Green, Royal Army Service Corps.
- 7671451 Lance-Corporal Andrew James Green, Pioneer Corps.
- W/11797 Sergeant Ethel May Green, Auxiliary Territorial Service.
- 954934 Battery Quartermaster-Sergeant Rowland Henry Green, Royal Regiment of Artillery.
- 2578538 Lance-Corporal Cyril Joseph Gregory, Royal Corps of Signals.
- T/63077 Lance-Corporal Harold Grenham, Corps of Royal Engineers.
- T/63711 Mechanist Staff-Sergeant Edward Charles Griffiths, Royal Army Service Corps.
- 5186007 Warrant Officer Class II (acting) Rex Griffiths, The Gloucestershire Regiment.
- 7956053 Corporal Norman Frederick Grimwade, Royal Armoured Corps.
- 3594561 Warrant Officer Class II (acting) Walter Edmund Grove, The North Staffordshire Regiment.
- 2156905 Lance-Corporal Melville Isaac Grubb, Corps of Royal Engineers.
- 4803871 Sergeant Frank Guest, The Lincolnshire Regiment.
- 1885321 Sergeant Ernest Habberley, Corps of Royal Engineers.
- 7676695 Corporal (acting) David George Hacker, Royal Army Pay Corps.
- 661660 Private Marjorie May Haddakin, Voluntary Aid Detachment.
- 7384844 Staff-Sergeant Leslie Hague, Royal Army Medical Corps.
- W/239469 Corporal Clarice Haley, Auxiliary Territorial Service.
- T/74464 Corporal Samuel Bilbie Hall, Royal Army Service Corps.
- T/202218 Corporal William Hall, Royal Army Service Corps.
- 1911991 Lance-Corporal Clifford Dean Hallas, Corps of Royal Engineers.
- 13108469 Warrant Officer Class II (acting) David Ernest Halliday, Pioneer Corps.
- 7612084 Sergeant George Bennell Halligan, Royal Army Ordnance Corps.
- 10534155 Staff-Sergeant Sydney Herbert Hallon, Royal Army Ordnance Corps.
- 5770631 Sergeant Arthur Leslie Halls, The Royal Norfolk Regiment.
- S/3969788 Corporal Henry Charles Hamilton, Royal Army Service Corps.
- 7662892 Warrant Officer Class II (acting) Ian Hamilton, Royal Army Pay Corps.
- 3779974 Sergeant John Hampson, Royal Armoured Corps.
- 882 Sergeant Ronald Frederick Hannah, Karachi Corps, Auxiliary Force (India).
- 1918631 Sergeant Frederick John Harding, Corps of Royal Engineers.
- W/2868 Sergeant Joan Harding, Auxiliary Territorial Service.
- 4379538 Sergeant Cecil Harold Baxter Harfield, The Green Howards (Alexandra, Princess of Wales's Own Yorkshire Regiment).
- 97004600 Staff-Sergeant Kenneth Godfrey Harland, Royal Army Ordnance Corps.
- W/220205 Sergeant Daphne Kathleen Maud Harman, Auxiliary Territorial Service.
- S/4803005 Staff-Sergeant Matthew Raymond Harper, Royal Army Service Corps.
- 4393590 Sergeant Henry Theodore Harris, The Green Howards (Alexandra, Princess of Wales's Own Yorkshire Regiment).
- S/225765 Staff-Sergeant Albert Leslie Harrison, Royal Army Service Corps.
- 5933630 Corporal Dennis Ronald Hart, The Suffolk Regiment.
- 7585324 Staff-Sergeant Thomas Henry Hartland, Royal Electrical and Mechanical Engineers.
- 1460876 Sergeant Charles Harvey, Royal Regiment of Artillery.
- 6018521 Warrant Officer Class II (acting) Victor Gordon Harvey, The Essex Regiment.
- AC/5234 Warrant Officer Class I Hassan Ferjalla, The King's African Rifles.
- T/75538 Sergeant Frank Ralph Hawes, Royal Army Sen-ice Corps.
- 13071984 Sergeant Ronald George Herbert Hawkins, Pioneer Corps.
- 1921508 Corporal (acting) Roger Williajn Hawkins, Corps of Royal Engineers.
- 1884018 Sergeant (acting) Frederick Ernest Hawtin, Corps of Royal Engineers.
- 2339461 Sergeant Arthur Raymonds, Royal Corps of Signals.
- 4080840 Staff-Sergeant Frederick John Hayward, Army Physical Training Corps.
- GSS/56 Warrant Officer Class II Hazara Singh, Indian General Service Corps.
- 1636135 Bombardier Fred Heap, Royal Regiment of Artillery.
- 2322089 Sergeant James Henry Heatherington, Royal Corps of Signals.
- Company Quartermaster Sergeant Cyril William Henricksen, Falkland Islands Defence Force.
- 322036 Corporal Edward John Henson, I3th/ i8th Royal Hussars (Queen Mary's Own), Royal Armoured Corps.
- 2730066 Company Quartermaster-Sergeant William Herd, Welsh Guards.
- W/15500 Sergeant Bessy Hewitt, Auxiliary Territorial Service.
- 2128321 Lance-Corporal Arthur Heywood, Corps of Royal Engineers.
- 7662491 Sergeant Edward Heywood, Royal Army Pay Corps.
- 7604583 Staff-Sergeant Henry Heywood, Royal Army Ordnance Corps.
- 5190274 Sergeant (acting) Henry John Hicks, The Gloucestershire Regiment.
- 1447575 Sergeant Alfred Henry Higgins, Royal Regiment of Artillery.
- 1706447 Sergeant Harry Higton, Royal Regiment of Artillery.
- S/217140 Staff-Sergeant Roland Arthur Hill, Royal Army Service Corps.
- S/248996 Staff-Sergeant Raymond Stanley Hill, Royal Army Service Corps.
- S/152550 Sergeant Colin Samuel Hines, Royal Army Service Corps.
- 5185190 Sergeant John Reuben Hobbs, Royal Regiment of Artillery.
- 1083706 Bombardier Henry Herbert Hocking, Royal Regiment of Artillery.
- 7874579 Company Quartermaster-Sergeant Ellis William Hodder, Corps of Royal Engineers.
- 7687968 Sergeant Ronald Henry Holmes, Corps of Military Police.
- 1547357 Sergeant Frederick Holton, Royal Regiment of Artillery.
- 1460398 Sergeant Leonard Patrick Hornby, Royal Regiment of Artillery.
- 4621016 Sergeant Reginald Warneford Huffee, Royal Armoured Corps.
- 1985715 Sergeant George Edwin Hughes, Corps of Royal Engineers.
- 14234913 Sergeant John Hadyn Hughes, Royal Army Medical Corps.
- 3778293 Lance-Corporal Robert Ernest Hughes, Royal Armoured Corps.
- W/151549 Staff-Sergeant Alice Helen Margaret Hume, Auxiliary Territorial Service.
- S/158688 Staff-Sergeant (acting) Robert Frederick Humphreys, Royal Army Service Corps.
- 3392627 Lance-Sergeant Edgar Hunt, The East Lancashire Regiment.
- 5574209 Sergeant John Hunt, The Wiltshire Regiment (Duke of Edinburgh's).
- 1922786 Sergeant John Charles Hunt, Corps of Royal Engineers.
- 1884914 Sergeant James Frederick William Hunt, Corps of Royal Engineers.
- 7586093 Staff-Sergeant Clifford Ernest Hurst, Royal Army Ordnance Corps.
- 2221697 Staff-Sergeant Charles Richard Hutchings, South African Forces.
- 10537062 Corporal Kenneth Enoor Hutchings, Royal Army Ordnance Corps.
- S/6016104 Lance-Corporal Richard Blair Hutton, Royal Army Service Corps.
- S/203399 Staff-Sergeant James Thomson Ibbott, Royal Army Service Corps.
- S/221387 Staff-Sergeant James William Ilesley, Royal Army Service Corps.
- 2064629 Battery Quartermaster-Sergeant Austin Stanley Ingram, Royal Regiment of Artillery.
- 6212171 Sergeant James Cornelius Ingram, The King's Royal Rifle Corps.
- T/142222 Sergeant Ronald Ingram, Royal Army Service Corps.
- Sergeant Jasper Irofiala, British Solomon Islands Defence Force.
- 1414210 Staff-Sergeant John Cyril Irwin, Royal Regiment of Artillery.
- 2123407 Lance-Corporal Joseph Edwin Jackson, Corps of Royal Engineers.
- 1902730 Sergeant James Kenneth Jackson, Corps of Royal Engineers.
- 2187766 Sergeant Raymond Charles Jackson, Corps of Royal Engineers.
- 10571275 Sergeant (acting) Jack Jacobs, Royal Army Ordnance Corps.
- 5188240 Corporal Frederick William George James, The Gloucestershire Regiment.
- 1606024 Sergeant Norman James, Royal Regiment of Artillery.
- 7641854 Warrant Officer Class II (acting) Reginald Guy Jeffery, Royal Army Ordnance Corps.
- 1901995 Sergeant Harry Jenkinson, Corps of Royal Engineers.
- 1618004 Lance-Bombardier Densell Johns, Royal Regiment of Artillery.
- 2355032 Company Quartermaster-Sergeant (acting) Robert Johnstone, Royal Corps of Signals.
- 283221 Warrant Officer Class II (acting) Harry Roy Jones, Corps of Royal Engineers.
- 10530022 Corporal John Bonnor Jones, Royal Army Ordnance Corps.
- 5109276 Warrant Officer Class II (acting) James Frederick Jones, Royal Regiment of Artillery.
- 7520782 Lance-Gorporal Kenneth Stanley Jones, Royal Army Medical Corps.
- 2113865 Lance-Corporal Rowland Jones, Corps of Royal Engineers.
- 4037318 Corporal William Francis Jones, Army Catering Corps.
- 7053453 Sergeant Ernest Owen Jordan, Royal Army Ordnance Corps.
- 1885429 Staff-Sergeant Frank Judd, Corps of Royal Engineers.
- 4118893 Corporal Thomas Jump, The Cheshire Regiment.
- 2348778 Company Quartermaster-Sergeant George Frederick Justice, Royal Corps of Signals.
- 1554387 Gunner Joseph Kaufman, Royal Regiment of Artillery.
- 4979054 Sergeant (acting) Wilfred Kay, The Sherwood Foresters (Nottinghamshire and Derbyshire Regiment).
- S/250355 Sergeant David Kemp, Royal Army Service Corps.
- 323124 Lance-Sergeant John Kendall, Royal Regiment of Artillery.
- 13101415 Sapper Thomas Henry Kenna, Corps of Royal Engineers.
- 14660533 Sergeant (acting) Myles Kenny, Royal Army Ordnance Corps.
- S/407104 Staff-Sergeant Frederick Raymond Kewley, Royal Army Service Corps.
- 7881761 Staff-Sergeant John Leslie Kiddier, Royal Armoured Corps.
- 18390 Warrant Officer Class I Kipkoski S.O. Kiptembo, The King's African Rifles.
- 4392783 Sergeant George Robert Kitchen, Royal Armoured Corps.
- PAL/10308 Sergeant Alfred Kofler, The Palestine Regiment.
- 2323693 Company Quartermaster-Sergeant Henry Laidlaw, Royal Corps of Signals.
- 3216927 Lance-Sergeant William Robson Laidler, Corps of Royal Engineers.
- 4615627 Corporal John Lambert, Royal Army Ordnance Corps.
- 6099692 Lance-Corporal Ernest William Lambton, The Queen's Royal Regiment (West Surrey).
- 7665006 Warrant Officer Class I (acting) Harold Lamming, Royal Army Pay Corps.
- 6091029 Sergeant Roy Vincent Lane, Royal Regiment of Artillery.
- S/14301637 Sergeant Thomas Richard Langley, Royal Army Service Corps.
- 4917622 Sergeant Kenneth Osborne Lapper, Royal Armoured Corps.
- 1026979 Company Quartermaster-Sergeant Alfred Henry Lawrence, Corps of Royal Engineers.
- 5255812 Private James Nelson Lay, Royal Army Ordnance Corps.
- X2633 Staff-Sergeant Benjamin Robert James Layard, The Rhodesia Regiment.
- S/109626 Staff-Sergeant Harold Leach, Royal Army Service Corps.
- 7585513 Staff-Sergeant Leslie Aubrey Leeder, Royal Army Ordnance Corps.
- S/772312 Staff-Sergeapt Arthur Ernest Leigh, Royal Army Service Corps.
- 15254 Havildar Lekh Ram, 6th Rajputana Rifles, Indian Army.
- 2647938 Sergeant Asher Lelyveld, Corps of Royal Engineers.
- 7611321 Sergeant Thomas Bruce Levack, Royal Army Ordnance Corps.
- 1446496 Battery Quartermaster-Sergeant Sydney Wheeler Lewis, Royal Regiment of Artillery.
- 7632617 Staff-Sergeant Leonard Albert Lewsey, Royal Army Ordnance Corps.
- 7516423 Sergeant Thomas Joseph Long, Royal Army Medical Corps.
- 7536200 Staff-Sergeant Walter Long, The Army Dental Corps.
- S/86740 Sergeant Trevor Lougher, Royal Army Service Corps.
- S/217351 Sergeant Norman Frederick Lowen, Royal Army Service Corps.
- 2358687 Sergeant (acting) Harold Lusby, Royal Corps of Signals.
- S/5627741-Warrant Officer Class II (acting) John Henry Lynn, Royal Army Service Corps.
- 2127204 Sapper Malcolm Mackay, Corps of Royal Engineers.
- W/3887 Sergeant Christina Mackenzie, Auxiliary Territorial Service.
- 1475838 Staff-Sergeant Ronald Mackenzie, Corps of Military Police.
- 1470210 Battery Quartermaster-Sergeant John Maguire, Royal Regiment of Artillery.
- 2821799 Sergeant Peter Malcolm, The Seaforth Highlanders (Ross-shire Buffs, The Duke of Albany's).
- 7348589 Warrant Officer Class II (acting) David Leslie Manson, Royal Army Service Corps, attached Indian Army Corps of Clerks.
- 6917406 Company Quartermaster-Sergeant Edward Jack Mant, The Rifle Brigade (Prince Consort's Own).
- 2375589 Lance-Corporal John Barnett Markham, Royal Corps of Signals.
- 770808 Corporal Dorothy Marshall, Voluntary Aid Detachment.
- 1649514 Lance-Sergeant Graham Martin, Royal Regiment of Artillery.
- 6018454 Warrant Officer Class I (acting) Kenneth Wilfred Martin, The East Surrey Regiment.
- 2337465 Sergeant (acting) Ronald de Winton Martin, Royal Corps of Signals.
- 667 Warrant Officer Class II (acting) Vigilius Mascarenhas, Sind Rifles, Karachi Corps, Auxiliary Force, Indian Army.
- 3709354 Battery Quartermaster-Sergeant (acting) Alec Mashiter, Royal Regiment of Artillery.
- 7394592 Sergeant George Frederick Masters, Royal Army Medical Corps.
- 3519806 Company Quartermaster-Sergeant Frank Matthews, The Manchester Regiment.
- 7610523 Sergeant Francis Richard Maxwell, Royal Army Ordnance Corps.
- 1487273 Sergeant Charles Davison McCluggage, Royal Regiment of Artillery.
- 3054876 Sergeant Archibald McCrudden, Royal Army Ordnance Corps.
- 2210457 Lance-Sergeant Andrew Mcdonald, Corps of Royal Engineers.
- 1738086 Bombardier George Mcdonald, Royal Regiment of Artillery.
- 11412164 Bombardier William Alec Mcdonald, Royal Regiment of Artillery.
- S/4277817 Staff-Sergeant Cyril Charles Mcdonnell, Royal Army Service Corps.
- 6144371 Sergeant Henry Bernard McGarry, Royal Army Ordnance Corps.
- 1635191 Sergeant George William McGee, Royal Electrical and Mechanical Engineers.
- S/7536665 Warrant Officer Class II (acting) Frank Kenneth McGovern, Royal Army Service Corps.
- 4387413 Sergeant James McGurk, The Green Howards (Alexandra, Princess of Wales's Own Yorkshire Regiment).
- 14400454 Lance-Sergeant Alexander McLachlan, Corps of Royal Engineers.
- 2759456 Sergeant Ian McKinnon McLeod, The Black Watch (Royal Highland Regiment).
- NB/1001315 Staff-Sergeant Albert Megaw, The King's African Rifles.
- 7380250 Corporal James Ernest Mellor, Royal Army Medical Corps.
- 2065665 Sergeant Rupert Stanger Merriman, Royal Regiment of Artillery.
- 4394888 Lance-Corporal (acting) Stanley Metcalfe, Corps of Military Police.
- 14394934 Lance-Corporal Winston Metcalfe, Royal Army Ordnance Corps.
- 2056848 Sergeant John Middleton, Royal Regiment of Artillery.
- 929478 Sergeant John Millar, Royal Regiment of Artillery.
- 2357222 Corporal Harold Miller, Royal Corps of Signals.
- 2194238 Lance-Sergeant John Miller, Corps of Royal Engineers.
- 2196365 Sergeant Leonard Gordon Miller, Corps of Royal Engineers.
- T/208685 Company Quartermaster-Sergeant Herbert Lewis Millo, Royal Army Service Corps.
- 103229 Staff-Sergeant (acting) Patrick Mills, Corps of Royal Engineers.
- T/121756 Company Quartermaster-Sergeant (acting) Roy Milne, Royal Army Service Corps.
- 2821497 Sergeant William Milne, The Seaforth Highlanders (Ross-shire Buffs, The Duke of Albany's).
- W/19805 Sergeant Patricia Minchin, Auxiliary Territorial Service.
- 1692476 Warrant Officer Class II (acting) William Edwin Minnion, Royal Regiment of Artillery.
- 2347489 Sergeant John Henry Miskin, Royal Army Ordnance Corps.
- 54894 Warrant Officer Class I (acting) Charles Mitchell, Royal Army Pay Corps.
- S/14685447 Corporal John Edgar Mitchell, Royal Army Service Corps.
- 7610749 Warrant Officer Class II (acting) William George Mitchell, Royal Army Ordnance Corps.
- 2026323 Corporal William Henry Mitchell, Corps of Military Police.
- 7878834 Sergeant William John Montano, Royal Armoured Corps.
- S/158413 Staff-Sergeant Edward Brian Moore, Royal Army Service Corps.
- T/45864 Warrant Officer Class II (acting) Frank Reginald Morgan, Royal Army Service Corps.
- 1892308 Staff-Sergeant John Edward Morgan, Royal Electrical and Mechanical Engineers.
- 14339602 Lance-Corporal Richard Morgan, Royal Armoured Corps.
- 556934 Cprporal Jack Wilson Morrall, Royal Army Ordnance Corps.
- S/80820 Staff-Sergeant Albert Edward Morris, Royal Army Service Corps.
- 2750399 Sergeant Edward Bragan Morrison, The Black Watch (Royal Highland Regiment).
- K/176 Warrant Officer Class II (acting) Constance Gertrude Mosenthall, Women's Territorial Service (East Africa).
- 7635651 Sergeant Eric Mounsey, Royal Army Ordnance Corps.
- 6848131 Lance Corporal Harry Charles Mullan, The King's Royal Rifle Corps.
- 7624875 Sergeant Edwin Maurice Munro, Royal Army Ordnance Corps.
- 2827887 Lance-Corporal James Munro, The Seaforth Highlanders (Ross-shire Buffs, The Duke of Albany's).
- 1488444 Lance-Bombardier Frederick Malcolm Murray, Royal Regiment of Artillery.
- 2336674 Lance-Sergeant Edward Walter Neighbour, Royal Corps of Signals.
- W/186474 Staff Quartermaster-Sergeant (acting) Marion Ethel Nelson, Auxiliary Territorial Service.
- W/132695 Warrant Officer Class II (acting) Laura Nevitt, Auxiliary Territorial Service.
- W/6276 Corporal Ruth Eugenie Newington, Auxiliary Territorial Service.
- W/229337 Corporal Kathleen Dorothy Newman, Auxiliary Territorial Service.
- 14522360 Private Clement Rothery Nichol, Royal Army Medical Corps.
- 1885729 Sergeant (acting) Henry Arthur Nicholls, Corps of Royal Engineers.
- S/107426 Staff-Sergeant Leonard Ernest Nicholls, Royal Army Service Corps.
- 2751852 Corporal David Nicholson, Royal Tank Regiment, Royal Armoured Corps.
- W/20504 Sergeant Elsie Nicholson, Auxiliary Territorial Service.
- 10584107 Sergeant George Thomas Nicholson, Royal Army Ordnance Corps.
- 2592493 Sergeant Baron Arthur Francis Nimmo, Royal Corps of Signals.
- D/13268 Company Quartermaster-Sergeant Francis Arthur Nunn, Corps of Royal Engineers.
- 2389069 Corporal Frederick Douglas Nye, Royal Corps of Signals.
- 7629899 Corporal Edwin John Oakey, Royal Corps of Signals.
- 5830098 Company Quartermaster-Sergeant Eric Parr Oakman, The Green Howards (Alexandra, Princess of Wales's Own Yorkshire Regiment).
- W/219347 Lance-Corporal Betty O'Donnell, Auxiliary Territorial Service.
- 1985081 Staff-Sergeant Frank Ogden, Corps of Royal Engineers.
- 10572021 Staff-Sergeant Leslie William Oliver, Royal Army Ordnance Corps.
- 3390848 Corporal Fred Grant Ormerod, The East Lancashire Regiment.
- 1629321 Staff-Sergeant (acting) Vincent Ormondroyd, Royal Regiment of Artillery.
- T/262078 Staff-Sergeant Arthur Smith Othick, Royal Army Service Corps.
- 968 Sergeant Rufino Paes, Karachi Corps, Auxiliary Force (India).
- S/993545 Sergeant Frederick Jack Pardoe, Royal Army Service Corps.
- S/203882 Staff-Sergeant Robert George Parker, Royal Army Service Corps.
- 4114316 Company Quartermaster-Sergeant Thomas William Parker, The Cheshire Regiment.
- 892002 Sergeant William George Rupert Parker, Royal Regiment of Artillery.
- 2347834 Lance-Sergeant Cyril Parkin, Royal Corps of Signals.
- 10584809 Corporal Thomas Edward Parkinson, Royal Army Ordnance Corps.
- 3317375 Staff-Sergeant (acting) Alfred Canale-Parola, Army Catering Corps.
- 1577252 Lance-Bombardier Henry John Parrott, Royal Regiment of Artillery.
- 5574254 Sergeant Montague Arthur Parry, Corps of Royal Engineers.
- S/110814 Staff-Sergeant Claude Paterson, Royal Army Service Corps.
- 318504 Sergeant Clive Benfield Payne, The Nottinghamshire Yeomanry, Royal Armoured Corps.
- 103242 Staff-Sergeant Herbert Cyril Pearson, Corps of Royal Engineers.
- W/15951 Sergeant Ivy Louisa Pearson, Auxiliary Territorial Service.
- 7593521 Staff-Sergeant (acting) Norman Sidney Peevor, Royal Army Ordnance Corps.
- 10590548 Corporal George Frederick Penney, Royal Army Ordnance Corps
- 11001222 Staff-Sergeant Arthur Richard Penny, Royal Regiment of Artillery.
- 1602727 Lance-Sergeant Walter George Perry, Royal Regiment of Artillery.
- 2613182 Warrant Officer Class II (acting) Albert Henry Peters, Grenadier Guards.
- 588186 Sergeant Florence May Phillips, Voluntary Aid Detachment.
- 1460928 Sergeant William Charles Philp, Royal Regiment of Artillery.
- 198768 Sergeant Charles Edmund Pickering, Royal Army Service Corps.
- S/5348121 Staff-Sergeant George Leonard Plumb, Royal Army Service Corps.
- 2187977 Staff-Sergeant Frederick Poad, Corps of Royal Engineers.
- 28677 Sergeant Kateba Polikalipo, East African Ordnance Corps.
- 1836019 Lance-Sergeant Richard Alfred Powell, Corps of Royal Engineers.
- GSC/383 Upper Division Clerk Prabhaken Rao, Indian General Service Corps.
- 25918 Havildar Prem Singh, 6th Rajputana Rifles, Indian Army.
- W/22409 Sergeant Emily Price, Auxiliary Territorial Service.
- 2314080 Staff-Sergeant Ernest John Price, Corps of Royal Engineers.
- 5187977 Sergeant (acting) Albert John Hedley Privett, The Gloucestershire Regiment.
- 543085 Squadron Quartermaster-Sergeant Edward George Pryke, Royal Armoured Corps.
- 6844549 Sergeant Harold Frederick Radburn, The King's Royal Rifle Corps.
- W/39601 Sergeant Jean Betty Ramsay, Auxiliary Territorial Service.
- W/138335 Sergeant Florence May Ramsbottom, Auxiliary Territorial Service.
- 1160 Warrant Officer Class II Raphael S. O. Nguku, East African Signal Corps.
- 11271522 Corporal Eric Carlisle Rawlinson, Royal Electrical and Mechanical Engineers.
- S/119834 Warrant Officer Class I (acting) Charles Thomas Reader, Royal Army Service Corps.
- 2579106 Company Quartermaster-Sergeant (acting) Ronald Arthur Reece, MM, Royal Corps of Signals.
- 609835 Corporal Margaret Agnes Renwick, Voluntary Aid Detachment.
- 2599485 Company Quartermaster-Sergeant (acting) Richard Ephraim Reynolds, Royal Corps of Signals.
- 4262385 Sergeant James Valentine Richard, Royal Army Ordnance Corps.
- 3977236 Sergeant (acting) Gwilyn Idris Alfred Richards, Royal Army Ordnance Corps.
- S/57481 Corporal Frederick John Mayhew Ridge, Royal Army Service Corps.
- 3193700 Sergeant Harry Riley, The King's Own Scottish Borderers.
- 2329869 Sergeant Robert Henry Rimmer, Royal Corps of Signals.
- 7917291 Staff-Sergeant Bernard Rimmington, Royal Regiment of Artillery.
- 4196743 Lance-Sergeant John Trevor Roberts, Royal Corps of Signals.
- S/4208152 Lance-Corporal Nelson Roberts, Royal Army Service Corps.
- 10556502 Corporal Thomas Alfred Roberts, Royal Army Ordnance Corps.
- 1473647 Sergeant David William Lennard Robertson, Royal Regiment of Artillery.
- 3057277 Battery Quartermaster-Sergeant James Robertson, Royal Regiment of Artillery.
- W/23150 Sergeant Robina Joan Robertson, Auxiliary Territorial Service.
- 7632860 Sergeant Arthur David Frederick Robinson, Royal Army Ordnance Corps.
- W/163431V Staff-Sergeant (temporary) Marion Natalie Robinson, Women's Army Auxiliary Service, South African Forces.
- 7653147 Sergeant Robert Robinson, Royal Electrical and Mechanical Engineers.
- 2043990 Sergeant Edward George Plummer, Royal Regiment of Artillery.
- 2043493 Sergeant Charles Edward Robson, Royal Regiment of Artillery.
- 7370062 Sergeant Frederick Rodgers, Royal Army Medical Corps.
- 778750 Warrant Officer Class II (acting) Alfred Edward Rogers, Royal Regiment of Artillery.
- T/222116 Warrant Officer Class I (acting) Louis Enroll Rolfe, Royal Army Service Corps.
- 105458160 Private Meifer Rosenstein, Royal Army Ordnance Corps.
- 13028820 Sergeant Daniel Ross, Pioneer Corps.
- 7673783 Corporal William Ewart Rowlatt, Corps of Military Police.
- W/178081 Sergeant Josephine Ruth Rudder, Auxiliary Territorial Service.
- 7878478 Sergeant William Percy Rudge, 1st Royal Gloucestershire Hussars, Royal Armoured Corps.
- 7517710 Staff-Sergeant Frederic Edward Ruffels, Royal Army Medical Corps.
- 14662414 Corporal Henry Rugman, Corps of Royal Engineers.
- 10537141 Sergeant Ernest Victor Russell, Royal Army Ordnance Corps.
- S/1585105 Staff-Sergeant John Russell, Royal Army Service Corps.
- 2330056 Lance-Sergeant Aubrey Sadofsky, Royal Corps of Signals.
- GS/18066 Cook Saktoo, Indian General Service Corps.
- W/90600 Corporal Joan Mary Austin Salter, Auxiliary Territorial Service.
- T/2051959 Sergeant Reginald Ernest Salter, Royal Army Service Corps.
- PAL/30261 Corporal Vladimir Samiri, The Palestine Regiment.
- W/12876 Sergeant Marfydd Samuels, Auxiliary Territorial Service.
- 2889832 Sapper Stanley Thomas Sanders, Corps of Royal Engineers.
- 6977710 Colour Sergeant William Edward Sanderson, The Royal Inniskilling Fusiliers.
- 13069339 Corporal William James Sanderson, Pioneer Corps.
- W/217598 Corporal Evelyn Wallace Sandilands, Auxiliary Territorial Service.
- W732895 Sergeant Ellen Sarbutts, Auxiliary Territorial Service.
- W/11905 Sergeant Maude Adelaide Sargeant, Auxiliary Territorial Service.
- W/20940 Sergeant Marion Iris Saunders, Auxiliary Territorial Service.
- 745678 Sergeant Edgar Saville, Royal Regiment of Artillery.
- 1737260 Bombardier William Saunders, Royal Regiment of Artillery.
- S/178511 Sergeant (acting) James Ronald Saward, Royal Army Service Corps.
- WAC/8707 Staff-Sergeant Alma Leslie Saxty, Women's Army Auxiliary Corps (India).
- W/98763 Corporal Dinah Gwynneth Scandrett, Auxiliary Territorial Service.
- 7647441 Staff-Sergeant Harry Schroder, Royal Army Ordnance Corps.
- W/43665 Sergeant Constance Elaine Scholes, Auxiliary Territorial Service.
- W/10479 Staff-Sergeant Alice Liddell Scott, Auxiliary Territorial Service.
- 2611726 Sergeant Ernest Croft Scott, Grenadier Guards.
- GC/10392 Band Sergeant Seidu Lagos, The Gold Coast Regiment.
- 7645640 Corporal John Holmes Selby, Royal Army Ordnance Corps.
- W/264184 Corporal Renee Dorothy Sell, Auxiliary Territorial Service.
- S/2139522 Staff-Sergeant Arthur Henry Francis Selmes, Royal Army Service Corps.
- 13043193 Corporal (acting) Robert Reginald Senior, Royal Army Ordnance Corps.
- 3648 Warrant Officer Class I Shabani Marjani, East African Signal Corps.
- 1437760 Staff-Sergeant John Millar Shannon, Corps of Royal Engineers.
- 1953498 Staff-Sergeant Ernest George Shelton, Corps of Royal Engineers.
- 7689205 Warrant Officer Class I (acting) John Fell Shepherd, Corps of Military Police.
- 2614932 Colour Sergeant Thomas William Sherratt, Grenadier Guards.
- 13096944 Staff-Sergeant (acting) Frederick George Shersby, Royal Army Service Corps, E.F.I.
- 3122079 Company Quartermaster-Sergeant Alfred William Shillitto, The Royal Scots Fusiliers.
- 804883 Battery Quartermaster-Sergeant Edward George Shopland, Royal Regiment of Artillery.
- S/2134522 Staff-Sergeant John Gordon Silver, Royal Army Service Corps.
- 557725 Sergeant Richard Henry Simmonds, Royal Armoured Corps.
- 10546287 Corporal Arnold Geoffrey Simpson, Royal Electrical and Mechanical Engineers.
- L/NCA/1113 Sergeant Owen Clarence Sinclair, The Jamaica Regiment.
- W/178823 Sergeant Nancy Singleton, Auxiliary Territorial Service.
- NRA/20055 Corporal Isaac Sitimela, East African Army Service Corps.
- 7621770 Sergeant Albert William Skinner, Royal Electrical and Mechanical Engineers.
- W/187659 Sergeant Joyce Shippings, Auxiliary Territorial Service.
- 83487V Warrant Officer Class II (temporary) John Sleep, South African Forces.
- 1659393 Sergeant Harold Percival Slocombe, Intelligence Corps.
- 2586801 Sergeant Albert Henry Smale, Royal Corps of Signals.
- W/41266 Sergeant Edith Grace Smart, Auxiliary Territorial Service.
- 3775834 Sergeant Albert Gordon Smith, The King's Regiment (Liverpool).
- 7347142 Corporal Fred Smith, Royal Army Medical Corps.
- K/53 Staff-Sergeant Irene Smith, Women's Territorial Service (East Africa).
- 5345834 Company Quartermaster-Sergeant Sidney Harold William Nelson Smith, The Royal Berkshire Regiment (Princess Charlotte of Wales's).
- S/5117384 Staff-Sergeant (acting) James Henry Smith, Royal Army Service Corps.
- W/2206 Sergeant Catherine Rosemary Clarke-Smith, Auxiliary Territorial Service.
- Private Dennis John Sollis, Falkland Islands Defence Force.
- 1552229 Warrant Officer Class I (acting) Robert Harry Victor Spalding, Royal Army Service Corps, attached Indian Army Corps of Clerks.
- W/117641 Sergeant Hilda Constance Sparrow, Auxiliary Territorial Service.
- S/14535222 Private Frank Spellacy, Royal Army Service Corps.
- 556326 Company Quartermaster-Sergeant William Gordon Stacey, Royal Corps of Signals.
- 2322858 Sergeant George Stannard, Royal Corps of Signals.
- 4861587 Corporal (acting) Harry Stead, Corps of Military Police.
- 13046385 Sergeant David Stearn, Intelligence Corps.
- 7654731 Corporal Albert George Steele, Royal Electrical and Mechanical Engineers.
- 2592085 Company Quartermaster-Sergeant Arthur Leslie Steer, Royal Corps of Signals.
- 5669172 Sergeant Albert Ernest John Stenner, Pioneer Corps.
- 7522491 Staff-Sergeant John William Stephenson, Royal Army Medical Corps.
- 545088 Sergeant Audre Edwina Strange, Voluntary Aid Detachment.
- 5181931 Lance-Bombardier Ernest Holland Stratford, Royal Regiment of Artillery.
- 10576695 Sergeant Frank Taylor, Royal Army Ordnance Corps.
- 2123188 Staff-Sergeant Richard Watt Taylor, Corps of Royal Engineers.
- 7360263 Staff-Sergeant (acting) Leonard Albert Terrey, Royal Army Medical Corps.
- S/6354695 Lance-Corporal Percy George Thatcher, Royal Army Service Corps.
- 2091592 Sapper Joseph Thomas, Corps of Royal Engineers.
- S/207962 Corporal Philip Alan Thomas, Royal Army Service Corps.
- 1098426 Bombardier Wallace Milton Thomas, Royal Regiment of Artillery.
- 33496V Staff-Sergeant (temporary) John Morrison Thomson, South African Forces.
- 2588794 Lance-Sergeant (temporary) George Tibble, Royal Corps of Signals.
- S/215766 Staff-Sergeant Donald Augusto Emilio Toledo, Royal Army Service Corps.
- 4034266 Corporal Cecil James Tolley, The Durham Light Infantry.
- 5374421 Sergeant Lewis Tombs, The Oxfordshire and Buckinghamshire Light Infantry.
- 2320085 Sergeant Graham Tomes, Royal Corps of Signals.
- 2655387 Sergeant Charles James Tomlinson, Coldstream Guards.
- 1632051 Warrant Officer Class II (acting) Harold Tonge, Royal Regiment of Artillery.
- 2112786 Sergeant William John Tubes, Corps of Royal Engineers.
- 10570024 Corporal Philip Francis Tunstill, Royal Army Ordnance Corps.
- 14225072 Lance-Corporal Frederick Harold Turner, Corps of Royal Engineers.
- S/130118 Sergeant (acting) George Brown Turner, Royal Army Service Corps.
- S/6404321 Warrant Officer Class I (acting) Walter Harry Turner, Royal Army Service Corps.
- 10553025 Sergeant William Twohig, Royal Electrical and Mechanical Engineers.
- 4607975 Lance-Corporal William Frederick Tyson, Royal Army Ordnance Corps.
- LN/9330 Sergeant James Ugboaja, African Pioneer Corps.
- 5350948 Staff-Sergeant Edward Arthur Underdown, Royal Army Service Corps, attached Indian Army Corps of Clerks.
- 2599926 Lance-Sergeant Donald Patrick Munro Urquhart, Royal Corps of Signals.
- 133125V Sergeant William James Van Coller, South African Forces.
- 5378524 Sergeant Harry Venes, Army Air Corps.
- 2337421 Sergeant George Venvil, Royal Corps of Signals.
- 7599829 Staff-Sergeant Clifford Granville Vere, Royal Electrical and Mechanical Engineers.
- 194393V Corporal Daniel Johannes Viljoen, South African Forces.
- 2092654 Sergeant Harold Wainwright, Corps of Royal Engineers.
- W/15906 Staff-Sergeant Mildred Constance Wakefield, Auxiliary Territorial Service.
- 7596960 Staff-Sergeant Robert Alan Walden, Royal Army Ordnance Corps.
- 2333428 Corporal Clyde Douglas Waller, Royal Corps of Signals.
- 2078861 Sergeant (acting) Herbert Ware, Corps of Royal Engineers.
- S/189765 Warrant Officer Class II (acting) Francis John Walter Watson, Royal Army Service Corps.
- 2986107 Sergeant Gordon Hunter Baird Watson, Royal Regiment of Artillery.
- 7630682 Staff-Sergeant Frederick Leslie Watts, Royal Army Ordnance Corps.
- 2123625 Corporal Francis Howard Webb, Corps of Royal Engineers.
- W/12994 Staff-Sergeant (acting) Elsie Welch, Auxiliary Territorial Service.
- 10511299 Staff-Sergeant Walter Leonard Wellington, The Army Dental Corps.
- W/115375 Sergeant Rose May Welton, Auxiliary Territorial Service.
- S/103869 Sergeant Stanley William Wesson, Royal Army Service Corps.
- 10559571 Private Moses Charles Westwood, Roval Armv Ordnance Corps.
- 1898660 Warrant Officer Class II (acting) Francis Claude White, Corps of Royal Engineers.
- 7383274 Lance-Corporal Lloyd Frederick George Whitehouse, Royal Army Medical Corps.
- 7583336 Staff-Sergeant Alfred Francis Whitell, Royal Electrical and Mechanical Engineers.
- S/217236 Staff-Sergeant Daniel Richard Whiteman, Royal Army Service Corps.
- 5254497 Sergeant Robin George Whittaker, Pioneer Corps.
- 2609500 Sergeant Alban Gerrard Whittard, Welsh Guards.
- 1520450 Battery Quartermaster-Sergeant Stanley William Whittle, Royal Regiment of Artillery.
- 1890602 Warrant Officer Class II (acting) William Whittle, Corps of Royal Engineers.
- L/NCA/5162 Battery Quartermaster-Sergeant Sydney Arnold Wiggan, The Jamaica Regiment.
- 2316014 Warrant Officer Class II (acting) Leslie Charles Wilce, Royal Corps of Signals.
- 4858223 Warrant Officer Class II (acting) George Wilkins, Royal Army Service Corps, attached Indian Army Corps of Clerks.
- 800434 Sergeant Ronald Alexander Wilkinson, Royal Regiment of Artillery.
- W/24526 Warrant Officer Class II (acting) Muriel Alice Willey, Auxiliary Territorial Service.
- S/7604498 Staff-Sergeant Colin James Williams, Royal Army Service Corps.
- 1928009 Sergeant James Alfred Williams, Corps of Royal Engineers.
- 3964592 Lance-Corporal Melville Henry Williams, Corps of Royal Engineers.
- 1565014 Sergeant Reginald Williams, Royal Army Service Corps, attached Indian Army Corps of Clerks.
- 7391051 Sergeant John Magnus Williamson, Royal Army Medical Corps.
- 5624150 Sergeant Kenneth Williamson, The Devonshire Regiment.
- 7388962 Lance-Corporal Kenneth Stewart Williamson, Royal Army Medical Corps.
- 1626920 Sergeant Charles Edwin Wilson, Royal Regiment of Artillery.
- 5890052 Corporal Sidney George Wilson, The Northamptonshire Regiment.
- 3763418 Sergeant William James Wilson, The King's Regiment (Liverpool).
- 2021921 Warrant Officer Class II (acting) Thomas William Winney, MM, Royal Army Ordnance Corps, attached Indian Army Ordnance Corps.
- S/6336023 Staff-Sergeant Herbert Winters, Royal Army Service Corps.
- 10585334 Corporal (acting) Henry Charles Witham, Royal Army Ordnance Corps.
- 5186521 Sergeant Douglas Henry Woodman, The Gloucestershire Regiment.
- S/150020 Sergeant John Campbell Woodrow, Royal Army Service Corps.
- 2067951 Staff-Sergeant Bernard Woolf, Royal Electrical and Mechanical Engineers, attached Indian Electrical and Mechanical Engineers.
- 323682 Sergeant John Alfred Wright, The Warwickshire Yeomanry, Royal Armoured Corps.
- 752227 Sergeant Ernest Young, Royal Army Medical Corns.
- 885969 Sergeant Frederick Young, Royal Regiment of Artillery.
- 2070815 Sapper Robert Young, Corps of Royal Engineers.
- 7641134 Staff-Sergeant Sidney Thomas Young, Royal Army Ordnance Corps.
- 5180117 Sergeant Wallace Alfred Young, The Gloucestershire Regiment.

=== Royal Air Force ===
- 524524 Flight Sergeant Kenneth Harry Adlington.
- 527960 Flight Sergeant William Valentine Alexander.
- 935136 Flight Sergeant Robert Allison, RAFVR.
- 504901 Flight Sergeant Rene Gilbert Arthur.
- Can/R.70492 Flight Sergeant Wilfred Valentine Axford, RCAF.
- 957060 Flight Sergeant Eric Arthur Baker, RAFVR.
- 743159 Flight Sergeant Henry Meredith Ball, RAFVR.
- 550496 Flight Sergeant Leonard George Bath.
- 1188679 Flight Sergeant Sydney Ernest Bedford, RAFVR.
- 568758 Flight Sergeant Douglas Bennett.
- 611000 Flight Sergeant Donald Frederick Augustus Beresford.
- Can/R.70703 Flight Sergeant Wilfred Merian Berglund, RCAF.
- 947707 Flight Sergeant John Bray, RAFVR.
- 520550 Flight Sergeant Raymond Brook.
- 565231 Flight Sergeant Charles Hill Brown.
- 513641 Flight Sergeant Clarence Bryan.
- 567473 Flight Sergeant William Cecil George Budden.
- 508278 Flight Sergeant John Burchell.
- 511681 Flight Sergeant Robert Hendry Campbell.
- 541302 Flight Sergeant Patrick Joseph Carpenter.
- 536455 Flight Sergeant Stanley John Carr.
- 563795 Flight Sergeant John Carter.
- 506234 Flight Sergeant George Ernest Cluett.
- 365381 Flight Sergeant Dudley Francis Eugene Cockle.
- 561074 Flight Sergeant Ronald Harry Cook.
- 103968 Flight Sergeant William Cooper.
- 550644 Flight Sergeant Kennedy Victor Coveney.
- 930863 Flight Sergeant Ivor Thomas Cox, RAFVR.
- 752369 Flight Sergeant Charles Arthur Cryer, RAFVR.
- 326806 Flight Sergeant Robert Dalrymple.
- 335010 Flight Sergeant John Edward Denham.
- 506623 Flight Sergeant Samuel Dobson.
- 563095 Flight Sergeant William Dobson.
- 629019 Flight Sergeant William Ernest Downes.
- 340595 Flight Sergeant Robert Drew.
- 564589 Flight Sergeant Archibald Dudman.
- Can/R.60801 Flight Sergeant Charles Dunham, RCAF.
- 560747 Flight Sergeant George Kenneth England.
- 564175 Flight Sergeant John Martyn Ennor.
- 630101 Flight Sergeant James Henry Blakeley Ferris, RAFVR.
- 515063 Flight Sergeant William Frederick Fogg.
- 250674 Flight Sergeant William Oliver Folkes.
- 1009251 Flight Sergeant John William French, RAFVR.
- 1222703 Flight Sergeant Stanley Friend, RAFVR.
- 563554 Flight Sergeant Ronald Percival Harold Gibbs.
- 364025 Flight Sergeant Alec Vince Gladstone.
- 522680 Flight Sergeant Thomas Bernard Glover.
- 193582 Flight Sergeant Charles Edward Henry Glue.
- 936617 Flight Sergeant Geoffrey Green, RAFVR.
- 564667 Flight Sergeant Henry John Kitchener Hammond.
- 562727 Flight Sergeant William John Graham Hastings.
- 760928 Flight Sergeant Leslie Arthur Hensford, RAFVR.
- 801430 Flight Sergeant Sidney Francis Hill, RAFVR.
- 799770 Flight Sergeant William Alhert Hillier, RAFVR.
- 366316 Flight Sergeant Robert George Hoffman.
- 529519 Flight Sergeant Alfred John Holmes.
- 56557 Flight Sergeant Leslie William Homer.
- 357898 Flight Sergeant Arthur Ernest Hooker.
- 1106155 Flight Sergeant Wilfrid Horner, RAFVR.
- 365743 Flight Sergeant Leslie Frederick Hotham.
- 1284322 Flight Sergeant Arthur Edward Walter Hunt, RAFVR.
- 560998 Flight Sergeant George Hutton.
- 614464 Flight Sergeant Frederick Bracegirdle Jepson.
- 569079 Flight Sergeant Edward Jones.
- N.Z.405029 Flight Sergeant Roy Gerard Maurice Kennard, RNZAF.
- 532885 Flight Sergeant John Frederick King.
- 550194 Flight Sergeant Douglas Cyril Lambert.
- 570920 Flight Sergeant William Frederick Langley.
- 562780 Flight Sergeant Colin Parr Lendon.
- 523952 Flight Sergeant Geoffrey Milton Limbert.
- 959285 Flight Sergeant Arthur Geoffrey Lindars, RAFVR.
- 564910 Flight Sergeant Herbert Loach.
- 566994 Flight Sergeant William Lockerbie.
- 970708 Flight Sergeant Ronald MacFarlane.
- 572241 Flight Sergeant Jack Arthur George Markham.
- 327144 Flight Sergeant James Marnock, RAFVR.
- 215338 Flight Sergeant George Leonard Martin.
- 1101258 Flight Sergeant Harold Milner.
- 550203 Flight Sergeant Francis Edwin Mitchell.
- 564234 Flight Sergeant Ralph John Minty.
- 560846 Flight Sergeant Albert John Monk.
- Can/R88247 Flight Sergeant Lewis Smith Munsie, RCAF.
- Can/R.68471 Flight Sergeant William Alexander Murray, RCAF.
- Aus.5640 Flight Sergeant Kenneth William Muzzell, RAAF.
- 343300 Flight Sergeant Thomas Edward Neal.
- 999925 Flight Sergeant George Arthur Nuttall, RAFVR.
- 506270 Flight Sergeant Henry Charles Oakley.
- 561841 Flight Sergeant Denis Rowland O'Brien.
- 336193 Flight Sergeant Arnold Oxley.
- 568904 Flight Sergeant Thomas John Paddon.
- 1190971 Flight Sergeant John Parker, RAFVR.
- 566840 Flight Sergeant Robert Philip Parker.
- 611966 Flight Sergeant Sidney Frank Parker.
- 590858 Flight Sergeant Eric Parkin.
- 364967 Flight Sergeant Frank Paske.
- 983050 Flight Sergeant Joseph Ernest Payne, RAFVR.
- 652208 Flight Sergeant Arthur Samuel Pierce.
- 563576 Flight Sergeant Ernest Edward Albert Peake.
- 803484 Flight Sergeant Thomas Francis Piggott, RAFVR.
- 561315 Flight Sergeant Cyril William Thomas Porter.
- 330756 Flight Sergeant Charles William Potter.
- 613260 Flight Sergeant Charles Edward Powers.
- 566886 Flight Sergeant James Edward Price.
- 540159 Flight Sergeant Philip Brendon Price.
- 361727 Flight Sergeant Edward David Proctor.
- 933172 Flight Sergeant John Ranson, RAFVR.
- 364980 Flight Sergeant William Henry Rickwood.
- 565277 Flight Sergeant Leonard James Rose.
- 350389 Flight Sergeant Harold James Ruck.
- 516138 Flight Sergeant John Stanley Russell, RAFVR.
- 203564 Flight Sergeant Norman Kobig Ruxton.
- 979571 Flight Sergeant Donald Salmon, RAFVR.
- 370823 Flight Sergeant James Leonard Salmon.
- 522757 Flight Sergeant Arthur Sampson.
- 770015 Flight Sergeant Sidney Harold Sanders, RAFVR.
- 550145 Flight Sergeant Herbert John Saunders.
- 562626 Flight Sergeant Robert Shakespeare.
- 938910 Flight Sergeant Henry George Augustus Sherwin, RAFVR.
- 1505228 Flight Sergeant George William Siddons, RAFVR.
- 567395 Flight Sergeant Allan Simpson.
- 547509 Flight Sergeant Sydney Spooner.
- Can/R.52360 Flight Sergeant Hugh William Stewart, RCAF.
- 947474 Flight Sergeant John Stott, RAFVR.
- Can/7846 Flight Sergeant Frederick James McCullough Sullivan, RCAF.
- 1182182 Flight Sergeant Cyril Albert George Taylor, RAFVR.
- 644994 Flight Sergeant Gordon Frederic Tisley.
- 561933 Flight Sergeant Robert William Hutchinson Todd.
- 563493 Flight Sergeant Leonard Austin Tosdevin.
- 356956 Flight Sergeant Alfred Ernest Trundle.
- 361660 Flight Sergeant Harold Claude Walker.
- 540491 Flight Sergeant John James Wallett.
- 370503 Flight Sergeant John Edward Walton.
- 365979 Flight Sergeant Alexander Henry Webber.
- 1089493 Flight Sergeant Harry Wesson, RAFVR.
- 535866 Flight Sergeant Stanley Isiah Westwood.
- Can/4145A Flight Sergeant Donald Leslie Whellams, RCAF.
- 1004187 Flight Sergeant Cyril Wilding, RAFVR.
- 564915 Flight Sergeant Ronald James Wilkinson.
- 561392 Flight Sergeant John Frederick c Wilson Williams.
- 622759 Flight Sergeant Wilfred Williams.
- 354438 Flight Sergeant Arthur Geoffrey Haynes Winwood.
- 905061 Flight Sergeant Eric Francis Wise, RAFVR.
- 1101779 Flight Sergeant William Young, RAFVR.
- 635990 Acting Flight Sergeant William Ballam.
- 545936 Acting Flight Sergeant George Edward Barrett.
- 523640 Acting. Flight Sergeant Raymond Bill.
- 1185709 Acting Flight Sergeant John Edward Brown, RAFVR.
- 553229 Acting Flight Sergeant Charles George Bushell.
- 640719 Acting Flight Sergeant Norman Frank Carter.
- 910069 Acting Flight Sergeant Kenneth Ronald Connatty, RAFVR.
- 1259625 Acting Flight Sergeant Ronald Clarke, RAFVR.
- 1056721 Acting Flight Sergeant Andrew Shiels Galbraith, RAFVR.
- 804184 Acting Flight Sergeant David George Richard Goyder, RAFVR.
- 411447 Acting Flight Sergeant William Alfred Edward Grant.
- 908205 Acting Flight Sergeant Reginald George Holladay, RAFVR.
- 624174 Acting Flight Sergeant Campbell McLeod.
- 1121807 Acting Flight Sergeant Solomon Marks, RAFVR.
- 614867 Acting Flight Sergeant Edward William Meggitt.
- 981850 Acting Flight Sergeant Geoffrey Arnold Pryor, RAFVR.
- 572185 Acting Flight Sergeant Alan Robinson.
- 907470 Acting Flight Sergeant James Alexander Rumsby, RAFVR.
- 1311430 Acting Flight Sergeant Robert William Rush, RAFVR.
- Acting Flight Sergeant James Rutherford, RAFVR.
- 1287289 Acting Flight Sergeant Albert Charles Schaefer, RAFVR.
- 571164 Acting Flight Sergeant Henry Gordon Tunbridge.
- 928137 Sergeant Thomas Arnold, RAFVR.
- 911720 Sergeant James Bertram Aylett, RAFVR.
- 1057902 Sergeant Donald Henry Baines, RAFVR.
- 1375397 Sergeant Cecil Clifford Baker, RAFVR.
- 1239192 Sergeant John Baker, RAFVR.
- 1453147 Sergeant Leslie William Charles Baldwin, RAFVR.
- 1308862 Sergeant Leslie Ernest Barnes, RAFVR.
- 276335 Sergeant Emerson Edwin Bell.
- 973082 Sergeant Jack Benson, RAFVR.
- 1617410 Sergeant Reginald George Bird, RAFVR.
- 937986 Sergeant Edward Donald Blackwell, RAFVR.
- 549269 Sergeant John James Bland.
- 960316 Sergeant Frank Blyth, RAFVR.
- 1287994 Sergeant Frederick Arthur Bradbury, RAFVR.
- 2235384 Sergeant John Ernest Leigh Brett, RAFVR.
- 1433728 Sergeant George Bernard Brookes, RAFVR.
- 949437 Sergeant Edward Brown, RAFVR.
- 990010 Sergeant James Wood Brown, RAFVR.
- Can/R.2582 Sergeant Paul Joseph Brunnelle, RCAF.
- 546187 Sergeant Charles Lane Fox Sackville-Bryant.
- 1867521 Sergeant Anthony Henry Bubb, RAFVR.
- 363876 Sergeant Leslie Bull.
- 574244 Sergeant John Kenneth Burke.
- Sergeant Alan Patrick Canary, RAFVR.
- 855175 Sergeant John Chadwick, RAFVR.
- 922744 Sergeant Eric John Richard Challen, RAFVR.
- 949059 Sergeant Kenneth Chambers, RAFVR.
- 569350 Sergeant Maurice Victor Charles Chambers.
- 9645420 Sergeant Edward Brown Chaney.
- 940588 Sergeant Harold Gordon Styles Churchard, RAFVR.
- 511137 Sergeant Reginald Arthur Guy Cockburn.
- 547045 Sergeant Vernon Ivor Coggon.
- 1384125 Sergeant Frederick Charles Cole, RAFVR.
- 505420 Sergeant William Robert Cooke.
- 1008701 Sergeant John Cooper, RAFVR.
- 1020714 Sergeant Sidney Cowie, RAFVR.
- 908087 Sergeant Frederick Thomas Cuckow, RAFVR.
- 1127137 Sergeant Clarence James Cumisky, RAFVR.
- 710154 Sergeant Christopher Michael Cutchie, RAFVR.
- Can/R.61317 Sergeant Harold Alexander Dale, RCAF.
- 1167934 Sergeant David Thomas Davies, RAFVR.
- 1262588 Sergeant Ronald William Cresswell Day, RAFVR.
- 954888 Sergeant Benjamin Henry Deitch, RAFVR.
- 976598 Sergeant Colin Robert Delf, RAFVR.
- 800490 Sergeant Francis William De Vroome, RAFVR.
- 1106592 Sergeant David Donaldson, RAFVR.
- 999968 Sergeant Harold Downing, RAFVR.
- 808424 Sergeant James Dunn, RAFVR.
- 024659 Sergeant Arthur Dyson.
- Aus.30379 Sergeant Roy Ernest Edwards, RAAF.
- 1011757 Sergeant Gordon Arthur Elston, RAFVR.
- 949042 Sergeant Charles Patrick Ennis, RAFVR.
- 1366595 Sergeant William Murray Ewart, RAFVR.
- 1240106 Sergeant Frederick James Faulkener, RAFVR.
- 1480954 Sergeant Ronald Fell, RAFVR.
- 633196 Sergeant James Thomas Ford, Royal Air Force,
- 520708 Sergeant Frederick James Foreman.
- 567535 Sergeant Robert John Forster.
- 971460 Sergeant Alan Granville Foster, RAFVR.
- 649957 Sergeant Frederick Derick Fox.
- 613043 Sergeant Alec Fraser.
- 26287 Sergeant Harry Arthur Frost.
- 631786 Sergeant Leonard Garner.
- 1246669 Sergeant William Frederick Germain, RAFVR.
- 986984 Sergeant John Alfred Gleadall, RAFVR.
- 757573 Sergeant Ralph Goddard, RAFVR.
- 756982 Sergeant William Thomas Goodenough, RAFVR.
- 941765 Sergeant William Goodier, RAFVR.
- 1020303 Sergeant Leslie Goulding, RAFVR.
- 522724 Sergeant John Edward William Graves.
- 816095 Sergeant William Greer, RAFVR.
- 974883 Sergeant Archibald Ernest Griffiths, RAFVR.
- 1157163 Sergeant Walter Patrick Guymer, RAFVR.
- 525179 Sergeant Charles Halliwell.
- Can/R.97910 Sergeant Frederick Thomas Hamilton, RCAF.
- 1193170 Sergeant Albert Obed Harden, RAFVR.
- 1282636 Sergeant Edwin Thomas Hayward, RAFVR.
- 937713 Sergeant William Haywood, RAFVR.
- 642624 Sergeant Francis Ralph Heath.
- 919624 Sergeant Albert Henry Heaven, RAFVR.
- 1188571 Sergeant Reginald Henson, RAFVR.
- 911001 Sergeant Donald Vivian Heydon, RAFVR.
- 3007955. Sergeant Alfred Ernest Hicks, RAFVR.
- 1280823 Sergeant Harold Hill, RAFVR.
- 635072 Sergeant Ronald Stanley Hill.
- 611255 Sergeant Leslie Robert Hinkin.
- 945338 Sergeant James Wilson Hodge, RAFVR.
- 1181593 Sergeant Edward Albert Frederick Holmes, RAFVR.
- 920332 Sergeant Edwards Thomas Holt, RAFVR.
- 1151637 Sergeant Henry House, RAFVR.
- 544171 Sergeant Victor Edgar Edward House.
- Can/R.97904 Sergeant Joseph Mellon Thorne Hughes, RCAF.
- Can/R.85380 Sergeant William Lenard Ross Huston, RCAF.
- 903805 Sergeant Stanley Edward James, RAFVR.
- Can/R.79722 Sergeant Thomas Douglas Jamieson, RCAF.
- 568736 Sergeant George Maurice Jarratt.
- 1408376 Sergeant Desmond Jeremiah, RAFVR.
- 1366844 Sergeant William Jessiman, RAFVR.
- Sergeant Chaposi John, Rhodesian Air Askari Corps.
- 365517 Sergeant Charles Thomas John.
- 1446329 Sergeant Lawrence Byron Journeaux, RAFVR.
- 1257970 Sergeant William Edward Jordan, RAFVR.
- Sergeant Sabiti Kalumeya (now Warrant Officer Class II), Rhodesian Air Askari Corps.
- 1253035 Sergeant Emmanuel William Kamsler, RAFVR.
- 568770 Sergeant John Leonard Kell.
- Can/R.71574 Sergeant Ambrose Guy Kelly, RCAF.
- 954901 Sergeant Charles William Kent, RAFVR.
- 1252658 Sergeant Cecil George Kilby, RAFVR.
- 976490 Sergeant David Henry Knight, RAFVR.
- 348308 Sergeant Frederick William Lazell.
- 620578 Sergeant James Learmont.
- 53599 Sergeant John Joseph Leatheam.
- 1034358 Sergeant Harry Cyril Ledbetter, RAFVR.
- 289471 Sergeant John Legge.
- 908954 Sergeant Sydney Peter John Le Masurier, RAFVR.
- Can/R.72242 Sergeant Peter Lepage, RCAF.
- 1020097 Sergeant Robert Liddle, RAFVR.
- Can/R.152964 Sergeant Edgar James Love, RCAF.
- 2216746 Sergeant George Harold McClement, RAFVR.
- 1002093 Sergeant Alexander Buchanan McKee, RAFVR.
- 518257 Sergeant William John McKenna.
- 1542856 Sergeant John Clifford McManus, RAFVR.
- 916326 Sergeant Denis James Major, RAFVR.
- 1109137 Sergeant Frank Rodney Marks, RAFVR.
- 943159 Sergeant Charles Wilfred Marriott, RAFVR.
- 566384 Sergeant Gilbert John Marsh.
- 1157837 Sergeant Cyril Coling Marston, RAFVR.
- 800590 Sergeant Frederick Charles Auchell Mayne, RAFVR.
- 841570 Sergeant Dennis Richard Patrick Melville, RAFVR.
- 1256055 Sergeant Eric William Charles Miller, RAFVR.
- 935426 Sergeant Alan Moore, RAFVR.
- 761186 Sergeant Harold Thomas Morris.
- 981836 Sergeant Kenneth Whiteley Morris, RAFVR.
- 803483 Sergeant Robert Campbell Munro.
- 1273538 Sergeant Kenneth William Musson, RAFVR.
- Sergeant Gilbert Nawamka Rakate, Rhodesian Air Askari Corps.
- 1302387 Sergeant John Hurst Nettleton, RAFVR.
- 509716 Sergeant William Murrin Newcombe.
- 530325 Sergeant Clarence Reginald Newell.
- Can/R.92422 Sergeant Donald Malcolm Nicholson, RCAF.
- 1006576 Sergeant Edward James Noon, RAFVR.
- 618517 Sergeant John Page.
- 1124457 Sergeant Oswald Pennock, RAFVR.
- 868528 Sergeant Cecil Perkins, RAFVR.
- 1267591 Sergeant James Frederick Peters, RAFVR.
- 973596 Sergeant Norman Stanley Picker, RAFVR.
- 362545 Sergeant Robert Albert Pikesley.
- 1171670 Sergeant Alfred Pink, RAFVR.
- 942191 Sergeant Arthur Pitchford, RAFVR.
- 640127 Sergeant Gordon Raymond Pook.
- 562992 Sergeant Robert Ashby Powell.
- 550628 Sergeant Leonard Owen Price.
- 954163 Sergeant Ernest Harry Reade, RAFVR.
- 965306 Sergeant George Alexander Reid, RAFVR.
- 1266947 Sergeant Geoffrey Reginald Restall, RAFVR.
- 1076315 Sergeant Jack Retallick, RAFVR.
- 1192423 Sergeant Aubrey Robert Ashton Rigby, iRAFVR.
- 1106345 Sergeant Jack Roberts, RAFVR.
- 1124812 Sergeant Douglas Graham Robinson, RAFVR.
- 1148035 Sergeant John Thomas Weatherson Robinson, RAFVR.
- 248907 Sergeant George Arthur Robotham.
- 619261 Sergeant William Randolph Rock.
- 951935 Sergeant Harry Roebuck, RAFVR.
- Can/R.109343 Sergeant James Beck Rogan, RCAF.
- 1160681 Sergeant John George Saunders, RAFVR.
- 1190475 Sergeant Malcolm Arthur Scott, RAFVR.
- 977756 Sergeant Thomas Scullion, RAFVR.
- 566958 Sergeant Innes Alfred Shaw.
- 1292998 Sergeant Frederick John Shelton, RAFVR.
- 926185 Sergeant John Reginald Shorney, RAFVR.
- 1019749 Sergeant Joseph Shuttleworth, RAFVR.
- 904832 Sergeant Edward Arthur Sibbick, RAFVR.
- 1508872 Sergeant Christopher William Simpson, RAFVR.
- 923322 Sergeant Ronald Edward George Slade, RAFVR.
- 1070899 Sergeant Lionel Albert Slatter, RAFVR.
- 539523 Sergeant John Robert Stenlake.
- Aus.22358 Sergeant Herbert Sydney Story, RAAF.
- Can/R.70822 Sergeant Cloyd Milton Sweigard, RCAF.
- Sergeant Peter Tapera, Rhodesian Air Askari Corps.
- 950627 Sergeant George John Taylor, RAFVR.
- 1228857 Sergeant John Archibald Thornhill, RAFVR.
- 104788 Sergeant John Thornton, RAFVR.
- 974791 Sergeant Douglas Haig Tobutt, RAFVR.
- 1223858 Sergeant Edward Towler, RAFVR.
- 1606883 Sergeant Walter Jack Trainor, RAFVR.
- 953307 Sergeant Eric Trueman, RAFVR.
- 845645 Sergeant George Henry Tyler, RAFVR.
- 990061 Sergeant Norman Arthur Upton, RAFVR.
- 951956 Sergeant William Wallace, RAFVR.
- 1161839 Sergeant. Richard Stephen Walsh, RAFVR.
- 847302 Sergeant Albert Edward Weaser.
- 987272 Sergeant Thomas Harold Welsh, RAFVR.
- Aus.29347 Sergeant Richard John Western, RAAF.
- 1276120 Sergeant George Lewis White, RAFVR.
- 1006857 Sergeant Horace White, RAFVR.
- 643986 Sergeant Raymond Sidney Whitehead.
- 522935 Sergeant Daniel James Wilson.
- Can/R.107753 Sergeant Wilbert Wilson, RCAF.
- 1157954 Sergeant Eric Claude Woodford, RAFVR.
- 1190410 Sergeant Raymond John Wylie, RAFVR.
- 1385527 Acting Sergeant William Geere, RAFVR.
- 1655241 Acting Sergeant Bernard George Holland, RAFVR.
- 1440486 Acting Sergeant David Albert Philp, RAFVR.
- 6186V Acting Sergeant Maurice Christopher Smithers, SAAF.
- 1235957 Acting Sergeant William Walter Thrower, RAFVR.
- 95520V Acting Sergeant Leonard Leslie White, SAAF.
- 1559204 Corporal William Armstrong, RAFVR.
- 1039041 Corporal Squire Bardsley, RAFVR.
- 1294353 Corporal James Frederick Bareham, RAFVR.
- 1252557 Corporal Leslie Charles Barrell, RAFVR.
- 1436723 Corporal Arthur Phillip Barrett, RAFVR.
- 1662626 Corporal John Benson, RAFVR.
- 1118087 Corporal Arthur Bond, RAFVR.
- 1037624 Corporal Alan Brack, RAFVR.
- 1205803 Corporal Richard James Brown, RAFVR.
- 750372 Corporal George Burnett, RAFVR.
- 982075 Corporal Harold Carr, RAFVR.
- 1009881 Corporal Leslie William Chaplin, RAFVR.
- 536901 Corporal William James Albert Clarke.
- 1216203 Corporal Herbert Milton Cobb, RAFVR.
- 1492193 Corporal William Craddy, RAFVR.
- 1901298 Corporal Richard Joseph Cullen, RAFVR.
- 1519897 Corporal James Culshaw, RAFVR.
- 982565 Corporal Sidney Wilmott Drown, RAFVR.
- 1179624 Corporal James Sellar Dyett, RAFVR.
- 1290509 Corporal Eric Roy Foreman, RAFVR.
- 1142261 Corporal Alfred Edward Garner, RAFVR.
- 1150976 Corporal Gwyn Greatrex, RAFVR.
- 647958 Corporal Ernest Edward Green.
- 1230751 Corporal Edward George Gunning, RAFVR.
- 1166091 Corporal Arthur James Hardy, RAFVR.
- 935586 Corporal George Edward Harrison, RAFVR.
- 1512761 Corporal James Heath, RAFVR.
- 923898 Corporal Ronald Ernest Heath, RAFVR.
- 1241742 Corporal Joseph Albert Hill, RAFVR.
- 1533260 Corporal Roy Holland, RAFVR.
- 171592 Corporal Thomas Arthur Harold Howard.
- 986713 Corporal William Alfred Hughes, RAFVR.
- 1111174 Corporal George Robert Hunter, RAFVR.
- 987463 Corporal David John Spalding Hynd, RAFVR.
- 926638 Corporal James Patrick Ingham, RAFVR.
- 1075106 Corporal Harold George James, RAFVR
- 641672 Corporal John Louis James.
- Can/R.107445 Corporal Ernest Jesse Jenkins, RCAF.
- Can/R.122935 Corporal William Bernard Kerr, RCAF.
- 750933 Corporal Frederick James King, RAFVR.
- 1321144 Corporal James William Henry King, RAFVR.
- 1167576 Corporal Thomas Henry Kirk, RAFVR.
- 1088179 Corporal John Henry Knowles, RAFVR.
- Can/R.160379 Corporal John William Kressler, RCAF.
- 1207366 Corporal Wilfred Reginald Lambourne, RAFVR.
- 1191801 Corporal Ellis Lane, RAFVR.
- 629907 Corporal William Dennis Laskey.
- 1103532 Corporal Albert Edward Lilley, RAFVR.
- 929154 Corporal Sidney Alfred Lock, RAFVR.
- 1016919 Corporal Laurence Logan, RAFVR.
- 529413 Corporal Ernest Frederick John Ludlow.
- 1612744 Corporal Peter George Lungley, RAFVR.
- 1366411 Corporal George Hunter Mcalphine, RAFVR.
- 1342591 Corporal Peter McLeish, RAFVR.
- 1237668 Corporal John Joseph Martin, RAFVR.
- 1126703 Corporal Victor William Mathers, RAFVR.
- 1526781 Corporal William Meagher, RAFVR.
- 1323180 Corporal Harold Geoffrey Merriman, RAFVR.
- Can/R.143231 Corporal Harry Glen Minter, RCAF.
- 996184 Corporal Tom Morley, RAFVR.
- 1204204 Corporal Sidney Naylor, RAFVR.
- 1379097 Corporal Frederick Nicholas Neale, RAFVR.
- 1420571 Corporal Edward O'Hare, RAFVR.
- 1268157 Corporal Alfred George Olney, RAFVR.
- 1684062 Corporal Gilbert Parr, RAFVR.
- 921768 Corporal Percy Pearse, RAFVR.
- 1030328 Corporal Leslie Perry, RAFVR.
- 1403756 Corporal Aneurin George Phillips, RAFVR.
- 1258847 Corporal Ernest George Phillips, RAFVR.
- 243378 Corporal Percy John Piper.
- 1408749 Corporal Percy Richard Campbell Probyn, RAFVR.
- 1175557 Corporal Percy Rayner, RAFVR.
- 523453 Corporal Christopher Rhodes, RAFVR.
- 1283832 Corporal Charles Henry Richardson, RAFVR.
- 1610359 Corporal Stanley Victor Rixon, RAFVR.
- 1114500 Corporal William Robinson, RAFVR.
- 936265 Corporal David Woods Ruddick, RAFVR.
- 1348806 Corporal Alexander Marshall Runcie, RAFVR.
- 1495531 Corporal John Salt, RAFVR.
- 1201274 Corporal Reginald Gilson Sheldrake, RAFVR.
- 1413595 Corporal Francis William Silk, RAFVR.
- 1281183 Corporal Thomas Francis Smith, RAFVR.
- 1432063 Corporal Alan Wycliffe Sparrow, RAFVR.
- 1217859 Corporal Cedric George Spreadbury, RAFVR.
- Can/R.122721 Corporal Omer Clayton Steele, RCAF.
- Can/R.139822 Corporal Harold Robert Stewart, RCAF.
- 1365429 Corporal Thomas Stewart, RAFVR.
- 618753 Corporal Alexander Turner Thompson.
- 1123095 Corporal James Walker Thomson, RAFVR.
- 1154239 Corporal George Kenneth Towner, RAFVR.
- 1293562 Corporal Harry Francis Tricker, RAFVR.
- 1204158 Corporal Arthur Hugh Turner, RAFVR.
- 911748 Corporal Ernest Gordon Varcoe, RAFVR.
- 1506528 Corporal Leslie Waller, RAFVR.
- 1130725 Corporal Robert Stanley Watson, RAFVR.
- 1039369 Corporal Rowland John Webb, RAFVR.
- 1171507 Corporal Maurice Henderson Whitfield, RAFVR.
- 1692090 Corporal Henry Charles Bosworth Woodcock, RAFVR.
- Can/R.132409 Corporal Norman Archibald Wright, RCAF.
- 1101921 Corporal Edward Norman Cyril Young, RAFVR.
- 1527259 Acting Corporal William James Mowl, RAFVR.
- 1524916 Acting Corporal Maurice Overend, RAFVR.
- 327124V Air Mechanic Cecil Frank Wyles, SAAF.
- 1297881 Leading Aircraftman Alfred Allen, RAFVR.
- 1692338 Leading Aircraftman John Bell, RAFVR.
- 919822 Leading Aircraftman Alfred Stanley Beardon, RAFVR.
- 1318894 Leading Aircraftman Leonard Roystpn Bond, RAFVR.
- 339820 Leading Aircraftman Albert George Bouzane.
- 1054427 Leading Aircraftman Cecil Herbert Stanley Brain, RAFVR.
- 1527284 Leading Aircraftman Leslie John Bridgewater, RAFVR.
- 1311022 Leading Aircraftman Reginald James Brimacombe, RAFVR.
- 1307658 Leading Aircraftman John Sydney Brumby, RAFVR.
- 1371925 Leading Aircraftman George Duncan Coutts, RAFVR.
- 1447548 Leading Aircraftman Charles George Crabb, RAFVR.
- 932804 Leading Aircraftman George Montague Durrant, RAFVR.
- 962121 Leading Aircraftman William Henry Gardner, RAFVR.
- 1512002 Leading Aircraftman Leonard Imeson, RAFVR.
- 1527577 Leading Aircraftman Roy Draycott Ingham, RAFVR.
- 1227748 Leading Aircraftman Harold Marshall, RAFVR.
- 2213404 Leading Aircraftman William Albert Mays, RAFVR.
- 1178932 Leading Aircraftman John Albert Morris, RAFVR.
- 816116 Leading Aircraftman James Leslie Patience, RAFVR.
- 1403468 Leading Aircraftman Harold Percival Phillips, RAFVR.
- 1108403 Leading Aircraftman George Cunningham Pow, RAFVR.
- 1562535 Leading Aircraftman Alfred Robertson, RAFVR.
- 1143145 Leading Aircraftman Arthur Rowbotham, RAFVR.
- 1516199 Leading Aircraftman George Shaw, RAFVR.
- 812339 Leading Aircraftman Norman Percival Simmons, RAFVR.
- 1185548 Leading Aircraftman Samuel Robert Smith, RAFVR.
- 1463709 Leading Aircraftman Walter Merino Sterling, RAFVR.
- 1550958 Leading Aircraftman Andrew Stewart, RAFVR.
- 1689624 Leading Aircraftman Alan Vernon Stokes, RAFVR.
- 1565149 Leading Aircraftman Gordon Edward Tappenden, RAFVR.
- 1708159 Leading Aircraftman Donald Amman Thomas, RAFVR.
- 1166512 Leading Aircraftman Alfred Tyler, RAFVR.
- 1379625 Leading Aircraftman Frederick Arthur Whitlam, RAFVR.
- 1863288 Aircraftman 1st Class John Whitfield Cook, RAFVR.
- 457231 Flight Sergeant Gertrude Davies, WAAF.
- 886047 Flight Sergeant Barbara Brown Henderson, WAAF.
- 422406 Flight Sergeant Hilda Minnie Klein, WAAF.
- 426494 Flight Sergeant Edith Joan Pointon, WAAF.
- 2040507 Sergeant Agnes Nimmo Muir Connor, WAAF.
- 432490 Sergeant Marjory Ann Drake, WAAF.
- 884630 Sergeant Joyce Gwendoline Green, WAAF.
- 2076820 Sergeant Margaret Caroline Harris, WAAF.
- 884297 Sergeant Betty Marion Maurice, WAAF.
- 896275 Sergeant Phyllis Scott, WAAF.
- 890719 Sergeant Emily McDonald Smith, Whitehall, WAAF.
- 890255 Sergeant Ellen Caroline Stalker, WAAF.
- 2008644 Corporal Joyce Dorothy Blaber, WAAF.
- 481216 Corporal Joan Clatworthy, WAAF.
- 2013480 Corporal Joan Janet Disney, WAAF.
- 2044611 Corporal Isobel Key Dryden, WAAF.
- 2084549 Corporal Margaret Farrar, WAAF.
- 2028804 Corporal Mary Patricia Holberton, WAAF.
- 430119 Corporal Agnes Julia Jones, WAAF.
- 895555 Corporal Beatrice May, WAAF.
- 2045842 Corporal Margaret Mary Munro, WAAF.
- 460425 Corporal Annie Buchanan Forbes Upfold, WAAF.
- F.267476V Acting Corporal Phoebe Sylvia Du Toit, South African Women's Auxiliary Air Force.
- 2117200 Leading Aircraftwoman Anne Ross Cumming, WAAF.
- 884716 Leading Aircraftwoman Lilian May Searle, WAAF.
- 2022602 Leading Aircraftwoman Catherine Shaw, WAAF.
- 2138392 Leading Aircraftwoman Olive Sowray, WAAF.
- 2027236 Leading Aircraftwoman Nora Helen Speed, WAAF.

== Civil Division ==
=== United Kingdom ===
- Stanley Abell, MM, Head Office Keeper, Office of the Sergeant at Arms, House of Commons.
- Acomb Cassum, Lascar Serang, SS Moolton (Peninsular & Oriental Steam Navigation Company).
- Margaret Acton, Storekeeper, Central Hospitals Supply Service, Oxford. For services to Civil Defence.
- Alfred Henry Richard Adams, Chargeman of Skilled Labourers, Admiralty Gun Mounting Depot, Coventry.
- John Adams, Refrigerator Greaser, MV Empire Grace (Shaw Savill & Albion Company Ltd.).
- William Adams, Skilled Workman, Class I, London Telecommunications Region.
- Charles Edmund Addis, Foreman, Bulpitt & Sons Ltd.
- Hester Agnes Adrian, JP, Deputy Chief Billeting Officer, Cambridge.
- Abdul Jubbar X Tofore Al, Deck Cassab, SS Samgaudie (Thos. & Jno. Brocklebank Ltd.).
- Henry Albrow, Skipper of an Inshore Fishing Boat.
- Edward Lanning Alderman, Assembly Foreman, General Electric Company Ltd.
- Doreen Alderson, Member, Women's Land Army, Burstwick, Yorkshire.
- Frederick Healey Alexander, Staff Officer, Civil Defence Light Rescue Service, Islington.
- Mary Monilaws Alexander, Member, Scottish Women's Land Army, Bishopton, Renfrewshire.
- Millicent Alexander, Manageress, Catholic Women's League Services Club for HM Forces, Westminster.
- William James Alger, Chief Signal and Telegraphic Inspector (Stratford), London & North Eastern Railway Company.
- Alfred Ernest Allen, Foreman Turncock, Liverpool Corporation Water Works.
- Patrick Allen, Refrigerator Attendant, SS Mauretania (Cunard White Star Ltd.).
- Robert Richard Roy Allen, Assistant Line Superintendent, No. 8 Line, British Overseas Airways Corporation.
- John Altham, Foreman Plater, Grayson, Rollo & Clover Docks Ltd.
- William Alexander Amos, Observer, Royal Observer Corps.
- Annie Anderson, Weaver and Weaving Mistress, Baxter Bros. & Company Ltd.
- Doris Anderson, Leader in Charge, Y.M.C.A. Services Centre and Hdstel, Nottingham.
- George Grieves Anderson, Carpenter, SS Clan Murdoch (Cayzer, Irvine & Company Ltd.).
- John Anderson, Superintendent, Aberdeen City Emergency Mortuary Service. For services to Civil Defence.
- John Blair Anderson, Foreman Boilermaker, Rankin & Blackmore.
- John Henry Anderson, Inspector, Lanarkshire Constabulary. For services to Civil Defence.
- John Henry Anderson, Canteen Worker, Salvation Army. For services to the Forces in Iceland.
- Carl Ludwig Andresen, Boatswain, SS Garesfield (Wm. Dickinson & Company Ltd.).
- Albert William Apted, Chargehand Labourer, No. 1 Maintenance Unit, Royal Air Force.
- William Thomas Arlidge, Turner, Royal Aircraft Establishment, Farnborough.
- James Armstrong, Boatswain, MV Leinster (Belfast Steamship Company Ltd.).
- William Henry Downey Armstrong, Chief Aerodrome Groundsman, Sir W. G. Armstrong Whitworth Aircraft Ltd.
- Florence Mary Arnold, Supervisor of Cleaners, Ministry of Agriculture and Fisheries.
- Harold Edwin Arnold, Senior Draughtsman, Electrical Engineering Department, Admiralty.
- Henry Arnold, Able Seaman Lamp Trimmer, SS Flathouse (Stephenson Clarke Ltd.).
- Hugh Lawrence Sylvestre Arnold, Chief Observer, Royal Observer Corps.
- Margaret Ellen Ascombe, Temporary Engineering Assistant (F.), Grade I, Telephone Manager's Office, Sheffield.
- Alfred George Ash, Officer in Charge, St. John's Ambulance Association Flying Squad, West Ham.
- Thomas Atha, Chargehand Fitter, Royal Ordnance Factory, Barnbow.
- Harry Atherton, Winding Engineman, Pemberton Colliery Ltd.
- Charles Atkins, Furnace Builder and General Maintenance Worker, B.K.L. Alloys, Ltd.
- George Atkinson, lately Fire Guard Officer, Yeovil.
- Thomas Henry Axford, Civilian Garrison Engineer, Eastern Command, War Office.
- Ernest Bailes, Foreman of Trades, No. 38 Maintenance Unit, Royal Air Force.
- Joseph William Bailey, Inspector of Electrical Fitters, HM Dockyard, Sheerness.
- Richard John Hill Bailey, Chief Foreman, Millwrights and Hydraulic (Stratford), London & North Eastern Railway Company.
- Annie N. Baillie, Operative, Ministry of Aircraft Production Factory.
- Thomas Baillie, Company Officer, South Eastern Area of Scotland, National Fire Service.
- Grace Bertram Baines, Mobile Canteen Driver, Kent County, Women's Voluntary Services.
- Thomas Baird, Warrant Officer, No. 98 (St. Marylebone) Squadron, Air Training Corps.
- Edward John Baker, Senior Draughtsman, Electrical Engineering Department, Admiralty.
- Joseph John Baker, Underground workman, Earl of Dudley's Baggeridge Colliery.
- Gladys Mary Baldwin, lately Post Warden, Civil Defence Wardens Service, Lincoln.
- John William Baldwin, Chart Supply Officer, Admiralty, Colombo.
- Robert James Baldwin, Chief Engineer of a Steam Trawler.
- Madelaine, the Honourable Balfour, Head of Air Mail Despatch Room, Joint War Organisation of the British Red Cross Society and Order of St. John.
- John Conqueror Bambrough, Head Foreman Shipwright, Wm. Pickersgill & Sons Ltd.
- Arthur Thomas Bandy, Postman, London Postal Region.
- David Bannerman, Inspector, Lanarkshire Constabulary. For services to Civil Defence.
- Richard Eric Banyard, Corporal, Ambulance Unit, Joint War Organisation of the British Red Cross Society and Order of St. John.
- Albert Barber, Checkweighman, Kiveton Park Colliery.
- Samuel Henry Bark, Senior Examiner, Aeronautical Inspection Department, Ministry of Aircraft Production.
- Sidney Hubert Barker, Shop Steward, John I. Thornycroft Ltd.
- Thomas John Barker, Head Foreman, Frederick Braby & Company.
- Victor Samuel Barker, Chargehand, Enfield Rolling Mills (Aluminium), Ltd.
- John Barlow, Chargehand Foreman, Thos. Firth & John Brown & Company Ltd.
- Frederick John Barnden, Driver, Maidstone & District Motor Services Ltd.
- Walter Barnes, Boatswain, SS Fort Mattagami (John Cory & Sons Ltd.).
- Harriett Barnett, Temporary Postwoman, Chesterfield.
- Henry Smart Barnett, Outside Manager, Southampton Works, Medians Ltd.
- Oliver Barnett, lately Assistant Fire Guard Officer, Nottingham.
- Henry Samuel Lyne Barrat, Chief Carriage Shop Foreman (Swindon), Great Western Railway Company.
- Frederick Charles Barrett, Principal Yard Foreman, Central Ordnance Depot, London District, War Office.
- Basil Eccleston Bartrum, Leading Observer, Royal Observer Corps.
- Reginald Arthur Baskett, lately District Warden, Civil Defence Wardens Service, East Ham.
- Henry Bass, General Foreman, Shell-Haven Oil Refinery.
- Olive Bass, Member, Women's Land Army, Tonbridge, Kent.
- Joan Caroline Bastard, lately Group Head Warden, Civil Defence Wardens Service, St. Faiths & Aylsham.
- Wilfred Leighton Bateman, Chief Stevedore Foreman, Hull.
- John William Bath, Lodge Secretary, Penrikyber Colliery.
- Ernest William Batters, Assistant Overseer, Grade. II, Admiralty Outstation.
- James Menzies (Cairns Battison, Inspector (Postmen), Stirling.
- Albert George Baylis, Shop Manager, Standard Telephone & Cables Ltd.
- Albert George Beall, Charge Engineer, Queen Mary's (Roehampton) Hospital.
- Robert Beard, Regimental Quartermaster Sergeant, 1st Manchester R.A., Army Cadet Force.
- James Beattie, Foreman Engineer, Hail Russell & Company Ltd.
- Margaret Dora Beattie, Canteen Manageress, Navy, Army and Air Force Institutes.
- Arthur Beckett, Fitter Labourer, Norstands, Ltd.
- Thomas Goring Begg, Chargeman, Royal Naval Boom Defence Depot, Sheerness.
- Alfred Bell, Mains Foreman, Bradford Gas Department.
- Hugh Clarence Bell, Principal Engineering Foreman, J. I. Thornycroft & Company Ltd.
- Lorna May Bell, lately Member, Air Raid Precautions Control Room Staff, Hull.
- William Raymond Bellamy, Progress Chaser, Radio Production Unit, Ministry of Aircraft Production.
- Frederick Richard Bennett, Foreman of Works, HM Dockyard, Devonport.
- Cyril Robert Bentley, Foreman, Royal Aircraft Establishment, Farnborough.
- Harold Alfred Benwell, Senior Company Officer, No. 16 (Southampton) Area, National Fire Service.
- Michael Bergin, Chief Engineer of a Steam Trawler.
- Rowland Broughton Berkeley, Billeting Officer, Martley Rural District Council.
- George Berry, Foreman, Halex Ltd.
- Herbert Claude Betts, Assistant Foreman, Instrument Shop, Telecommunications Research Establishment, Ministry of Aircraft Production.
- Charles Leslie Bexson, Depot Manager, House Coal Distribution (Emergency) Scheme, Derby.
- Ernest Richard Bickerstaffe, Senior Quay Foreman, Williams & Jones Ltd.
- James Edward Biggs, Foreman (Temporary), Armaments Inspection Department, Ministry of Supply.
- David Bilney, Pensioner Civilian Tailor, HMS Ganges.
- Arthur Bird, Jnr., Foreman Tool Setter, Jury Holloware (Stevens) Ltd.
- Harry Rollo Birkwood, Foreman, Sheet Metal Workers, Grimsby Plumbing Company Ltd.
- Alfred William Bishop, Toolmaker, Royal Mint Refinery.
- George Henry Black, Leading Stoker, Aylesford Paper Mills.
- William Crosbie Black, Able Seaman, MV Reina Del Pacifico (Pacific Steam Navigation Company).
- John Alder Blackburn, Employee of Murphy Radio Ltd.
- Thomas Percy Blackham, lately Officer in charge, Civil Defence Voluntary Transport, Leicester.
- Staveley Mason Blackith, Cook of a Steam Trawler.
- William Blackwell, Superintendent of Stores, No. 3 Maintenance Unit, Royal Air Force.
- Joseph Blair, Boatswain, SS Baxtergate (Turnbull, Scott & Company).
- George Blake, Greaser, MV Dunnottar Castle (Union Castle Mail Steamship Company Ltd.).
- Lionel George Blampied, Warrant Officer, No. 179 (Bristol) Squadron, Air Training Corps.
- Edward Bolton, Chief Examiner, Aeronauticaj Inspection Department, Ministry of Aircraft Production.
- Salvatore Bonnici, Principal Foreman, Royal Engineer Workshops, Malta.
- Frederick Arthur Borlindor, War Reserve, Southend Police Force. For Services to Civil Defence.
- Sylvia Elizabeth Bosley, Member, Women's Land Army, Warwickshire.
- Thomas Boswell, Boatswain, SS Glenfinlas (Alfred Holt & Company).
- John Handel Bottomley, Acting Foreman (Unestablished), Inspectorate of Fighting Vehicles, Ministry of Supply.
- John Henry Boulden, Chargeman of Bricklayers, HM Dockyard, Devonport.
- Mary Elizabeth Boulsover, Quartermaster, Derbyshire Branch, British Red Cross Society.
- Sheila Ruth Bourne, Observer, Royal Observer Corps.
- Arthur Graham Bowers, Foreman, Ringway Experimental Shops, A. V. Roe & Company Ltd.
- James Bowie, Docker, Greenock.
- George Bowland, Boatswain's Mate, SS Rangitata (New Zealand Shipping Company Ltd.).
- Alfred Edwin Bown, Pettier, Bristol Foundry Company (Bristol) Industries Ltd.
- Henry Benedict Boyce, Donkeyman, SS Beltoy (Shamrock Shipping Company Ltd.).
- Frederick William Boyd, Foreman of Trades (Runways), R.A.F. Station, Mepal.
- Philip Boumthrey Boylan, employed in a Department of the War Office.
- Louis Emilie Boyle, Staff Officer, Casualty Service, Leeds. For services to Civil Defence.
- James Bradford, Coal Miner, Kaimes No. 1 Pit.
- George Arthur Bramley, lately Works Engineer and Officer in charge, Civil Defence Rescue Service, Battle.
- Joseph Brammer, First Class Cutler, Joseph Rodgers & Sons.
- Patrick Brannigan, Fireman, SS Broughty (Dundee, Perth & London Shipping Company Ltd.).
- Mary Honor Brassey, Head of Section, Purchasing Department, Headquarters, Women's Voluntary Services.
- Albert Samuel Bray, Foreman of Factory (Non-Mechanic), Royal Naval Armament Depot, Priddy's Hard.
- John Breakspear, Permanent Way Inspector (Didcot), Great Western Railway Company.
- Bernard Eustace Bremner, lately Chief Warden, Civil Defence Wardens Service, King's Lynn.
- William Alexander Bremner, Auxiliary Coastguardsman, HM Coastguard Service.
- George Bullen Brewer, Leading Foreman, Goonvean & Rostowrack China Clay Company Ltd.
- Samuel Bridgens, Senior Foreman, Imperial Chemical Industries (Metals) Ltd.
- William Henry Leece Bridson, Maintenance Fitter, Royal Ordnance Factory, Drigg.
- Ida Brierley, Job Router, Ericsson Telephones Ltd.
- William Briggs, Coal Distributor, Jarrow.
- Frederick Briscoe, Foreman, John Thompson Water Tube Boilers Ltd.
- George William Briscoe, Boatswain, SS Lipari (Moss Hutchison Line Ltd.)
- John William Brisland, Pumpman, SS Empire Cobbett (Eagle Oil and Shipping Company Ltd.)
- Henry Roger Britten, Established Machinist, HM Dockyard, Chatham.
- Charles Lewis Britton, Senior Foreman, Bakelite Ltd.
- Joseph Brogan, Ripper, Garswood Hall Collieries Company Ltd.
- John James Brook, Head of Stores, Watford Electric and Manufacturing Company Ltd.
- Ernest Brooke, Greaser, SS Salvage Chieftain (Liverpool and Glasgow Salvage Association).
- Percy George Brookes, Warrant Officer, No. 1200 (March and District) Squadron, Air Training Corps.
- George William Brooks, Storeholder, Grade A, Central Ordnance Depot, War Office.
- William Brooks, Fireman, SS Boston City (Bristol City Line of Steamers).
- Frederick Harry Broomfield, Electrical Overseer, Admiralty Outstation.
- George Edward Broomfield, In charge of Fuel and Light maintenance, Artillery Barracks, Woolwich.
- William Broomhead, Foreman, W. A. Tyzacks.
- Hunter Brown, Skipper of an Inshore Fishing Boat.
- James Barrie Brown, Shipwright, Ayrshire Dockyard Company Ltd.
- John Maddfeon Brown, Chargeman Fitter, Smith's Dock Company Ltd.
- Nicholas Brown, Inspector of Shipwrights, HM Dockyard, Rosyth.
- Richard Lawson-Brown, lately Fire Guard Training Officer, Leeds.
- William Brown, Fitter, Babcock & Wilcox Ltd.
- William Henry Brown, Assistant I, Royal Naval Torpedo Experimental Establishment, Greenock.
- Thomas Brownlee, Machine Shop Superintendent, Harold Andrews Grinding Company Ltd.
- Grace Olivia Bruce, Member of a Work Party, Joint War Organisation of the British Red Cross Society and Order of St. John.
- Edward Leonard Bruin, Foreman, Heath and Company.
- Frederick William Bryant, Foreman, Pye Radio Ltd.
- Kenneth Bryant, lately Senior District Warden, Civil Defence Wardens Service, Wandsworth.
- Henry Jefferson Bryon, Overlooker, Royal Ordnance Factory, Hereford.
- Charles Buckley, Able Seaman, MV Ajax (Alfred Holt & Company).
- Dorothy Annette Buckmaster, Member, Women's Land Army, Penn, Buckinghamshire.
- Freda Hannah Budden, Chargehand, Bush Radio Ltd.
- Arthur Henry Bullinaria, Foreman of Fitters, Royal Naval Torpedo Depot, Weymouth.
- Thomas Bunker, Skilled Workman, Class I, London Telecommunications Region.
- Harry Trowbridge Burden, Inspector of Storehouseman, British Admiralty Delegation, New York.
- Sydney Herbert Burford. Leading Foreman Marine Engineer Fitter, Manchester Dry Docks Company Ltd.
- Catherine Burgess, Assistant Forewoman, Royal Ordnance Factory, Chorley.
- Thomas Burgoyne, Fireman and Training Officer, Seaforth Colliery.
- Margaret Isabel Burkitt, Leader in charge, YMCA Mobile Canteen Service, Cambridgeshire.
- Albert Waller Burn, District Storekeeper, Sea Transport Stores, Liverpool, Ministry of War Transport.
- Rose Burridge, Housewives Training Officer, Bournemouth, Women's Voluntary Services.
- Reginald Lewis Burrows, Overseer, Admiralty Gun Mounting Depot.
- George William Randolph Bush, Works Manager, Thatcham Road Transport Service Ltd.
- William David Bush, Shift Process Chargehand, Imperial Chemical Industries Ltd.
- William Cadney, Principal Technical Foreman, No. 4 Maintenance Unit, Royal Air Force.
- Charles Herbert Caldicott, Inspector, Lincolnshire County Special Constabulary.
- Arthur Thomas Albert Callowhill, Stores Foreman, Ministry of Supply Experimental Establishment.
- Allan Sinclair Cameron, Boatswain, SS Empire MacCallum (Hain Steamship Company Ltd.).
- Katherine Cameron, Head Warden, Civil Defence Wardens Service, Edinburgh.
- Alice Isabel Campbell, Nursing Auxiliary, British Red Cross Society.
- Angus Campbell, Boatswain, SS Lairdsose (Burns & Laird Lines Ltd.).
- John Campbell, Foreman Ironman, Palmers Hebburn & Company Ltd.
- Samuel Gowrie Dalrymple Campbell, JP, lately Chief Warden, Civil Defence Wardens' Service, Oswestry.
- Mary Elizabeth Campsey, Temporary Engineering Assistant (F), Grade I, Telephone Manager's Office, Preston.
- Frederick Charles Cane, Fitter, Baker Perkins Ltd.
- George Frederick Joseph Caple, lately Superintendent, Civil Defence Rescue Service, Flaxton, North Riding of Yorkshire.
- Celia Laura Capner, Temporary Engineering Assistant (F), Grade I, Telephone Manager's Office, Chester.
- John Duncan Carnie, Chief Steward, SS Glenpark (J. & J. Denholm Ltd.).
- Benjamin Carr, Foreman, J. Bibby & Sons Ltd.
- William Henry Carrick, Pumpman, MV Davila (Anglo-Saxon Petroleum Company Ltd.).
- Percy Harold Carrington, Salvage Officer, Risdon Beazley Ltd.
- Ernest George Carter, Inspector, Bath Police Force. For services to Civil Defence.
- Fredrica Letitia Carter, Tracer, Admiralty Signal Establishment.
- Arthur Reginald Caswell, Turncock, HM Naval Base, Portland.
- James Maurice Causton, Turncock, Metropolitan Water Board.
- Georgina Cavill, Officer in charge, Shirehampton Nursing Division, St. John's Ambulance Brigade.
- Rosina May Chalk, Temporary Sorting Clerk and Telegraphist, Slough.
- Percival Claude Chandler, Head Quay Foreman, Elder Dempster Lines Ltd.
- Albert Edward Chapman, Sergeant, British Red Cross Society.
- William Chard, Mate of a Steam Trawler.
- William Walsingham Charles, Foreman Boilermaker, Mountstuart Dry Docks Ltd.
- Frederick John Henry Charman, Observer, Royal Observer Corps.
- Joseph Charnock, Senior Steward, SS Scythia (Cunard Steamship Company Ltd.).
- Gwendolyn Chate. For welfare services to the Forces in the Middle East.
- Avis Cecilia Chattey, Leader in charge, Y.M.C.A. Services Centre, Eastbourne Area.
- John Cheltenham, Able Seaman, SS Airesford (Fred Hunter (Management) Ltd.).
- Charles James Chester, Winding Shop Foreman, Lancashire Dynamo & Crypto Ltd.
- Daisy Cheverton. In charge of Tobacco Bond Store, Joint War Organisation of the British Red Cross Society and Order of St. John.
- George Childs, Storeholder, Admiralty Stores, Royal Albert Dock.
- Henry Andrew Childs, Motor Driver, Newspaper Delivery, Thomas Tilling Ltd.
- Edwin John Richard Chillcott, Works Foreman, H. & T. Proctor Ltd.
- Alfred Edwin Chivers, Skilled Optical Craftsman, Ross Ltd.
- Nellie Chivers, Canteen Manageress, Navy, Army and Air Force Institutes.
- Gordon Christie, Senior Inspector, Ipswich Police Force. For services to Civil Defence.
- Frederick William Chubbock, lately Senior Warden, Civil Defence Wardens Service, Norfolk.
- Harold Church, Coal Face Chargeman, Nottingham & Clifton Colliery Company Ltd,
- Catherine Anne Clark, Supervisor, No. 351 Maintenance Unit, R.A.F., Hussein Dey, Algiers.
- Francis William Clark, Chargehand Fitter, J. S. Doig (Grimsby) Ltd.
- John Nicol Clark, Second Steward, SS Cameronia (Anchor Line Ltd.).
- Thomas Frederick Clarke, lately Head Warden and Head Fire Guard, Civil Defence Wardens Service, Dartford.
- James Cyril Clancey, lately Staff Officer, Civil Defence Light Rescue Service, Kensington.
- Barbara Carter Clayden, Leading Firewoman, National Fire Service Headquarters.
- Kathleen Mary Clewer, Assistant Supervisor, Class I (Telephones), Post Office, Mansfield.
- William Cloke, Checkweighman, Thurcroft Colliery.
- Norah Kathleen Clough, Senior Woman Executive, Peto Scott Electrical Instruments Ltd.
- Robert William Clouston, Fireman, SS Francis Fladgate (Stephenson Clarke & Company Ltd.).
- Alice Joan Cockerill, Shop Supervisor, Painton & Company Ltd.
- Winifred Colbeck, Matron, Rounton Grange Hostel for Infirm Evacuees, Stokesley, Yorkshire.
- Leonard George Colbourne, Company Officer, No. 31 (Brighton) Area, National Fire Service.
- Frederick Cole, Foreman, Stanhope Engineering Company Ltd.
- Louisa Wigfield Cole, Assistant Nurse, British Red Cross Society.
- Antonio Collado, Head Ganger, D.C.R.E., War Department, Gibraltar.
- Albert Robert James Collins, Manager, Lighterage Department, James W. Cook & Company Ltd.
- William James Collins, Porter, Joint War Organisation of the British Red Cross Society and Order of St. John.
- Helen Freda Collishaw, Senior Assistant Stock-keeper, Joint War Organisation of the British Red Cross Society and Order of St. John.
- Arthur Henry Cook, DCM, MM, Chief Warden of the Tower of London.
- Fred Cook, Temporary Sorting Clerk and Telegraphist, Newark.
- George Cook, Deck Hand of a Steam Trawler.
- George Alfred Cook, Printer, Royal Naval Barracks, Devonport.
- Thomas Coombes, Assistant Inspector, Post Office, Ormskirk.
- Stanley Edward Coombs, Leading Erection Fitter, Vickers-Armstrongs Ltd.
- Stanley Harold Coombs, Carpenter, SS Maurentania (Cunard White Star Ltd.).
- Frederick George Cooper, Ganger (Poplar), London, Midland & Scottish Railway Company.
- William Thomas Cooper, Foreman, Ross Ltd.
- Maurice Coopersmith, Inspector, Engineering Department, General Post Office.
- Ada Copas, Chargehand, Trepur Paper Tube Company Ltd.
- William Copeland, Donkeyman, SS Northwood (Joseph Constantine Steamship Line Ltd.).
- Harold Corbett, lately Commandant, Civil Defence Rescue Service, Hoyland Nether, West Riding of Yorkshire.
- Henry Herbert Cordery, lately Chief Warden, Civil Defence Wardens Service, Worthing.
- Edward George Cornish, Foreman, Agency Services (Worthing), Ministry of War Transport.
- William Herbert Cort, Inspector, A. A. Jones & Shipman Ltd.
- Cuthbert Coulson, Chief Motor Mechanic, Admiralty Salvage Base, West Hartlepool.
- George Keeble Courtis, Second Class Draughtsman, Admiralty.
- Norman Cecil Courtney, First Class Draughtsman, Mine Design Department, Admiralty.
- William Cowie, Skipper of a Motor Fishing Boat.
- Albert Edward Cox, Foreman (Temporary), Armaments Inspection. Department, Ministry of Supply.
- Victor James Cox, Test Apparatus Designer, E. K. Cole Ltd. Walter Cox, Chargehand, Avimo Ltd.
- Herbert Norman Crabb, Depot Manager, Hants & Dorset Motor Services.
- Mary Ross Craddock, Ambulance Driver, Joint War Organisation of the British Red Cross Society and Order of St. John.
- Mary Beatrice Craib, Packer, Joint War Organisation of the British Red Cross Society and Order of St. John.
- James Craighead, Head Foreman Shipwright, Scotts' Shipbuilding & Engineering Company Ltd.
- William Edward Crawford, Foreman, F. H. Lloyd & Company Ltd.
- Archibald Henry Crawley, Acting Chief Inspector, War Department Constabulary.
- Thomas Cridland, Boatswain, SS Tetela (Elders & Fyffes Ltd.).
- Frederick Robert Andrew Crighton. Employed in a Department of the War Office.
- Maude Alice Crimp, Organiser and Supervisor, Forces Canteen, North Road Station, Plymouth.
- Dorothy Janet Crisp, Forewoman of Stores, No. 25 Maintenance Unit, Royal Air Force.
- Samuel Henry Pyle Croft, Instrument Maker, Hollo way Factory, General Post Office.
- William Henry Grossman, lately Deputy Chief Warden, Civil Defence Wardens Service, Willesden.
- Edward John Crowe, Housing Estate Superintendent, London County Council. For services to Civil Defence.
- Emma Elizabeth Crutchlow, Restaurant Superintendent, Londoner's Meals Service.
- Alfred Roy Cryer, lately Staff Officer to Controller in charge of Communications, Civil Defence Service, Bristol.
- John Cornelius Cummings, Transport Driver, Petroleum Board.
- Sarah Curtice, Member, Women's Land Army, Glewstone.
- Ivy Curtis, Forewoman, Alford Alder (Engineers) Ltd.
- Ernest Cutler, Yard Master (Feltham), Southern Railway Company.
- George Frederick Cuzner, Senior Artificer, Admiralty Signal Establishment.
- Ernest Walter Dace, Chargeman of Labourers, Electrical Section, Admiralty Engineering Laboratory, West Drayton.
- Frank Samuel Daniel, Tool-room Charge Hand, Standard Motor Company Ltd.
- Charles Danino, Police Constable, HM Dockyard, Gibraltar.
- Bernard Darcy, Works Foreman, Blackburn Aircraft Ltd.
- Thomas John Darling, Permanent Chargeman of Skilled Labourers, HM Dockyard, Chatham.
- Henry Hugh Darlington, Depot Storeholder, Ministry of Supply.
- Leonard Morton Darlow, Depot Manager, House Coal Distribution (Emergency) Scheme, Royston.
- John Darnes, Fitter and Welder, Dubilier Condenser Company Ltd.
- Cicely Davenport, Chief Supervisor, Telephone Section (Paddington) Great Western Railway Company.
- Thomas Davidson, Master-at-Arms, SS Pasteur (Cunard White Star Ltd.).
- Elizabeth Davies, Shift House Attendant, Royal Ordnance Factory, Swynnerton.
- James Davies, Foreman Engineer, Mountstuart Dry Docks Ltd.
- John Arthur Davies, Checkweighman, Rossington Colliery.
- Robert Augustus Davies, Machine Shop Foreman, English Needle & Fishing Tackle Company Ltd.
- Thomas Davies, Second Cook, SS Ardenza (Moss Hutchison Line Ltd.).
- Reginald Arthur Edward Davis, Chargeman of Electrical Fitters, HM Dockyard, Chatham.
- Irene Vida Davy, Leading Chargehand, Dubilier Condenser Company Ltd.
- Agnes Mary Day, Centre Organiser, Women's Voluntary Service, Malvern.
- William Deacle, Fireman, SS Louth (Belfast Steamship Company Ltd.).
- John Lamb Dempster, Superintending Foreman, Imperial Chemical Industries Ltd. (Explosive Division).
- William Charles Denman, Inspector of Works (M. & E.), Air Ministry Outstation.
- James Alfred Frederick Walter Denyer, Group Machine Hand, Royal Ordnance Factory, Woolwich.
- Leonard Harry Dewick. Employed in a Department of the Foreign Office.
- Edward Dickinson, lately Party Leader, Civil Defence Rescue Service, Dunkar Area, West Riding of Yorkshire.
- Richard Edward Dickson, Senior Foreman of Storehouses, Royal Naval Torpedo Depot, Portsmouth.
- Rosa Harriet Diplock, Sister, Church Army. For services to the Forces.
- John Divers, Greaser, MV Shelbrit II (Shell Mex & B.P. Ltd.).
- Clara Mary Dixon, Supervisor, War Department Workshops, Middle East.
- John Norman Dixon, Chargeman Plater, Smith's Dock Company Ltd., South Dock Co. Ltd.
- Percy Dixon, Trolley Bus Driver, Rotherham Corporation Transport.
- Cecil Kitchener Dobbing, Head Engineer, James A. Jobling & Company Ltd.
- Robert Dobson, Chargehand, Campbell & Isherwood Ltd.
- Imrie Bates Dodd, lately Staff Officer, Civil Defence Casualty Service, Lewisham.
- Charles Dodds, Coal Miner, Newbiggin Colliery.
- Thomas Robson Dodds, Foreman, Royal Ordnance Factory, Birtley.
- Samuel Doel, Drydock Foreman, Southampton Docks, Southern Railway Company.
- Robert John Doherty, Boatswain, SS Sea Fisher (Wm. France, Fenwick & Company Ltd.).
- Alexander Doloughan, Training Officer in Civil Defence and Fire Prevention, Orkney.
- James Donaldson, Skilled Labourer (Hired Turncock), HM Dockyard, Rosyth.
- Simon Donougher, Chief Shipworking Foreman, Liverpool.
- Arthur Dorrell, Able Seaman, SS Orontes, (Orient Steam Navigation Company Ltd.).
- Algernon Thomas Dowden, Senior Draughtsman, Electrical Engineering Department, Admiralty.
- Joseph Dowling, Fire Brigade Man, SS Pasteur (Cunard White Star Ltd.).
- Edith Downes, Sergeant, Ambulance Unit, Joint War Organisation of the British Red Cross Society & Order of St. John.
- William Downing, Master, War Department Floating Crane.
- Herbert Claremont Downs, Trimmer of a Steam Trawler.
- William Pinley Frederick Downs, Private, Ambulance Unit, Joint War Organisation of the British Red Cross Society & Order of St. John.
- Michael Doyle, Able Seaman, SS Empire Patriot (Currie Line. Ltd.).
- Blanche Louisa Driver, Charge Hand, R. A. Lister & Company Ltd.
- Margery Elizabeth Marion Drysdale, lately Staff Officer to ARP Controller, Crayford.
- Bertie George Dumbleton, lately Fire Guard Officer, High Wycombe.
- Robert Duncan, Catering Manager, Greenock Docks Canteen.
- James Vitty Dunkerley, lately Post Warden, Civil Defence Wardens Service, Potters Bar.
- Patrick Joseph Dunleavey, Donkeyman & Greaser, SS Oakfield (Hunting & Son Ltd.).
- Joseph Dunne, Fireman, SS Hove (Coppack Bros. & Company).
- John James Dunning, Foreman Shipwright, Green & Silley Weir Ltd.
- Patrick Joseph Dunphy, lately Deputy Fire Guard Staff Officer, Wood Green.
- Robert Durkin, Machine Shop Foreman, Airspeed Ltd.
- Mary Doreen Durn, Telephone Operator, Parnall Aircraft Ltd.
- Christmas Durrant, Lamptrimmer, MV Orari (New Zealand Shipping Company Ltd.).
- Ellen Young Dymock, Member, Motherwell and Wishaw Women's Auxiliary Police Corps. For services to Civil Defence.
- Noel Dyson, lately Assistant Fire Guard Training Officer, Kettering.
- James Dwyer, Storeholder, Grade A, Central Ammunition Depot, War Office.
- Walter Henry Eades, Chargeman of Skilled Labourers, HM Dockyard, Portsmouth.
- Nellie Isabel Easterlow, Capstan Setter, Hobourn Aero Components Ltd.
- Dorothy Louisa Eastoe, Counter Clerk & Telegraphist, London Postal Region.
- Christopher Frederick Earp, Foreman, Hamilcar Erecting Unit, General Aircraft Ltd.
- John Edmunds, Repairer, Sneyd Collieries.
- Frank Eisner, Glassblower, Lemington Glass Company.
- Jean Morrison Elder, Personnel Supervisor, Henry Balfour & Company Ltd.
- George Charles Edward Eldridge, Stores Porter and Driver, Joint War Organisation of the British Red Cross Society and Order of St. John.
- William Eley, Colliery Oddman, James Oakes & Company.
- Gwendoline Ellis, Member, Women's Land Army, Dingley, Northampton.
- William Thomas Ellis, Inspector, Plymouth Police Force. For services to Civil Defence.
- William Henry Elsmore, Efficiency Production Engineer, British Tool & Engineering Company Ltd.
- Ernest Embley, Able Seaman, SS Empire Planet (Golden Cross Line Ltd.).
- Rita Lavinia England, Forewoman, Royal Ordnance Factory, Glascoed.
- Margaret Dorothy English, Member, Young Men’s Christian Association. For services to the Forces in Iceland.
- Norman Entwistle, Head Foreman, Howard & Bullough Ltd.
- Erik Erikson, Lamp Trimmer, SS Cedartree (Shamrock Shipping Company Ltd.).
- Arthur Edgar Caswallon Evans, Brass Turner, Dewrance & Co. Ltd.
- Constance Evans, Supervisor, Military Telephone Exchange, Alexandria.
- Frank Evans, Fireman of a Steam Trawler.
- Marjorie Catherine Evans, Telephonist, London Telecommunications.
- Ralph George Evans, Deputy Office Keeper, Ministry of Fuel and Power.
- Sidney Arthur Evans. Employed in a Department of the Foreign Office.
- Annie Ewart, Senior Female Overlooker (Temporary), Armaments Inspection Department, Ministry of Supply.
- Samuel Exall, Able Seaman, SS Josiah P. Cressy (Tanfield Steamship Company Ltd.).
- William Frederick Facon, Foreman, Johnson Matthey.
- John Fairbairn, Moulder-Leading Hand, William Beardmore & Company Ltd.
- John Nicholson Fairbairn, Chief Steward, SS Salacia (Donaldson Line Ltd.).
- William Scott Fairholm, lately Staff Officer, Civil Defence Rescue Service, Ross and Cromarty.
- Andrew Fairless, Maintenance Worker, United Automobile Services Ltd.
- William Faux, Depot Foreman (Reading), Talbot Serpell Transport Company.
- Norman Arthur Fawkes, Works Foreman, Lincoln Cars Ltd.
- John James Feek, Chargehand, Hadfields Ltd.
- Margaret Feeny, Hostel and Canteen Organiser, Birmingham. For services to the Forces.
- John Ferguson, Divisional Chief Inspector, Air Ministry Constabulary.
- Robert John Ferguson, Detective Sergeant, Royal Ulster Constabulary.
- Godfrey Saxon Filliter, Chief Steward, MV Empire Maccoll (British Tanker Company Ltd.).
- Charles William Finch, Superintendent of Stores, No. 14 Maintenance Unit, Royal Air Force.
- Robert Finch, Chief Foreman, Westland Aircraft Ltd.
- Percy Steven Fisher, District Manager, Navy, Army, and Air Force Institutes.
- Reginald Maclntyre Fiske, Machine Shop Superintendent, Philco Radio & Television Corporation of Great Britain Ltd.
- Dorothy Winifred Joan Fitton, Firewoman, No. 27 (Manchester) Area, National Fire Service.
- Edward Fitzpatrick, Engineroom Storekeeper, SS Jamaica Producer (Kaye Son & Company Ltd.).
- Leslie Henry Flavill, Temporary Experimental Assistant II, Mine Design Department, Admiralty.
- Thomas Langridge Fletcher, Observer, Royal Observer Corps.
- William Flux, Foreman Shipwright, Aldous (Successors) Ltd.
- William Thomas Ford, Assistant Steward, SS Twickenham Ferry (Southern Railway Company).
- Alexander Forrest, Chief Steward, SS Lochnagar (Aberdeen Steam Navigation Company Ltd.).
- Joseph Forsyth, Head of Heat Treatment Department, William Beardmore & Company Ltd.
- Ernest William Foster, Chargeman of Bricklayers, HM Dockyard, Portsmouth.
- Dorothy Mary Foy, lately Supervisor, ARP Sub-Control, Minehead.
- Hilda Alice Foxton, Member, Women's Land Army, Billesdon, Leicestershire.
- William Graham Frame, lately ARP Training Officer, Hamilton.
- Arnold Sidney Francis, Boatswain, SS Empire Jumna (Coastal Tankers Ltd.).
- Thomas Sidney Frank, MM, Chief Observer, Royal Observer Corps.
- Edward Ernest Franklin, Shop Foreman, No. 3 Maintenance Unit, Royal Air Force.
- William George Fraser, Boatswain, SS Kildrummy (Dundee, Perth & London Shipping Company Ltd.).
- Percy Freck, Principal Yard Foreman, Grade A, Central Ordnance Depot, War Office.
- Edmund Charles Hogarth Freeman, lately Officer in Charge, Civil Defence Report & Control Centre, Great Yarmouth.
- Lilian Bertha Freeman, Braiding Shop Charge Hand, Sterling Cable Company Ltd.
- John French, Ship's Carpenter, SS Empress of Scotland (Canadian Pacific Steam ships Ltd.).
- John William Froom, Chief Docks Foreman, Barry Docks.
- Norman Henry Fryer, Foreman, Projectile & Engineering Company Ltd.
- Douglas Fuller, Donkeyman, SS Aberdonian (Aberdeen Steam Navigation Company Ltd.).
- Frederick Fuller, Inspector, London Passenger Transport Board.
- Royden Furse, Chief Steward, MV D. L. Harper (Anglo-American Oil Company Ltd.).
- Rose Mary Futrell, Welfare Officer, Lincoln County Borough. For services to Civil Defence.
- Elizabeth Fyfe, Parachute Packer, No. 4 Ferry Pool, Air Transport Auxiliary.
- Mary Finella Gammel, FANY. Employed in Department of War Office.
- George Gannett, Boatswain, SS San Melito (Eagle Oil & Shipping Company Ltd.).
- Joseph Garbett, Principal Foreman, No. 25 Maintenance Unit, Royal Air Force.
- Margaret Gardener, lately Machine Operator, Carron Company.
- Florence Maud Gardner, Forewoman, G. R. Scott & Company.
- Thomas Victor Garforth, District Storekeeper, Sea Transport Stores (Essex), Ministry of War Transport.
- George William Garner, Foreman, Fairey Aviation Company Ltd.
- Francis Woodhead Garnett, Observer, Royal Observer Corps.
- Henry Francis Garrett, Foreman Blacksmith, C. H. Bailey Ltd.
- Edith Alice Gay, Assistant Quartermaster, Birmingham Branch, British Red Cross Society.
- William Albert Gaylard, Acting Storehouseman, HM Dockyard, Devonport.
- Frederick William Gearing, Foreman Chief Metal Worker, Saunders-Roe Ltd.
- Charles Godfrey Leslie Geary, Foreman of Shipping, Royal Naval Armament Depot, Priddy's Hard.
- Ivy Ena George, Capstan Operator, Aeronautical & General Instruments Ltd.
- Christopher Gibbs, Naval Canteen Manager, Navy, Army and Air Force Institutes.
- Samuel George Gibbs, Third Hand of a Steam Trawler.
- Charles Gibson, lately Party Leader, Civil Defence Rescue Service, Sheffield.
- Douglas Cameron Gibson, Chief Steward, SS Clan Chisholm (Clan Line Steamers Ltd.).
- James Scotland Gibson, Chargehand Fitter, Vickers-Armstrongs Ltd.
- Alfred John Gidley, Chargeman of Shipwrights, HM Dockyard, Devonport.
- William Gilboy, Chargehand, F. Pratt & Company Ltd.
- Frank Gill, Donkeyman, SS Samaye (Clan Line Steamers Ltd.).
- Lachlan Gillies, DCM, Chief Observer, Royal Observer Corps.
- Jemima Gilligan, Sewing Flat Forewoman, Scottish Co-operative Wholesale Society Ltd.
- Charles Glazier, Senior Wash-houseman, Richmond House & Household Benefit Laundry Ltd.
- Muriel Goaman, Superintendent, Services Club, Reading, Women's Voluntary Services.
- George William Goble, Gas Welder, Panel Fittings Company Ltd.
- Emanuel Gonzalez, Established Leading Local Storehouseman, HM Dockyard, Gibraltar.
- Walter Good, Boatswain, MV Port Phillip (Port Line Ltd.).
- Benjamin Goodfellow, Assistant Engineer, North Western Road Car Company Ltd. For services to Civil Defence.
- Henry Goodier, lately Staff Officer, Civil Defence Rescue Service, Salford.
- John William Goodwin, Chief Observer, Royal Observer Corps.
- Louisa Lilian Elizabeth Gould, Temporary Engineering Assistant (F), Grade I, London Telecommunications Region.
- Beatrice Eugenie Gouldbourn, Member, Women's Land Army, Cemmaes, Montgomeryshire.
- James Gowans, Skipper of a Fishing Motor Boat.
- Duncan Grant, Section Leader, Western Inverness-shire, National Fire Service.
- Frank Grant. In charge of Packers and Porters, Joint War Organisation of the British Red Cross Society & Order of St. John.
- George Leonard Grant, Section Leader, Banchory, National Fire Service.
- Sydney Grant, Working Chargehand, Metropolitan Vickers Electrical Company Ltd.
- Reginald Thomas Gratwick, lately Organiser, Civil Defence Light Rescue Service, Hackney.
- Alistair Graves, Foreman, Aerodyne Ltd.
- Francis Gray, Foreman Fitter, Hawthorn Leslie & Company Ltd.
- William Gray, lately Head Warden, Civil Defence Warden Service, Bognor Regis.
- Arthur Green, Rivetter, Cammell Laird & Company Ltd.
- Arthur George Green, Aircraft Fitter, Cunliffe-Owen Aircraft Ltd.
- William Reginald Green, Shop Steward, Gloster Aircraft Company Ltd.
- William Gibson Greenaway, lately Chief Warden, Civil Defence Wardens Service, Boldon, Co. Durham.
- George Albert Victor Greenland, Assistant Foreman, Royal Aircraft Establishment.
- Henry Charles Greest, Chief Observer, Royal Observer Corps.
- George Gregory, MM, Chief Observer, Royal Observer Corps.
- Ormond Grey, Carpenter, SS Everleigh (W. J. Tatem Ltd.).
- George William Gridley, Printer, Thomas de la Rue Ltd.
- Hilda Elizabeth Poole Grieve, lately Staff Officer, ARP Control, Essex.
- Margaret Bruce Griffin, lately Senior Trainer, Ministry of Aircraft Production Guard Dog Training School.
- Percy William Grigsby, Under-foreman, Experimental Department, De Havilland Aircraft Company Ltd.
- Iris Groves, Conductress, Wilts & Dorset Omnibus Company.
- Marjorie Philippa Mary Guthrie, Warden, Flying Angel Club (Missions to Seamen), Fareham.
- Kathleen Amy Gutteridge, Parachute Packer, No. 6 Ferry Pool, Air Transport Auxiliary.
- Harold Frederick Guy, Printer, Thomas de la Rue Ltd.
- George Frederick Haddock, Member of the Staff of the British Consulate General, Barcelona.
- Harry Ernest Hadfield, Temporary Foreman, Royal Small Arms Factory, Enfield.
- Alfred Edward Hagger, Headquarters Inspector, Southern Railway Company.
- Mathew Armstrong Haig, Inspector, Renfrew County Special Constabulary.
- William Alfred Haincock, Chief Docks Foreman, Cardiff.
- Ernest Alfred Hall, Steward-in-Charge, SS Pipiriki (New Zealand Shipping Company Ltd.).
- Ernest George Hall, Foreman of Factory, Royal Naval Mine Depot, Prater.
- George Hall, Skilled Labourer, Admiralty Experimental Laboratory, West Drayton.
- Joseph William Hall, Chargeman Coppersmith, Central Marine Engine Works.
- Thomas Hall, Resident Inspector, Chorley Depot, Ribble Motor Services Ltd.
- Ursula Theodora Mary Hall, Observer, Royal Observer Corps.
- Vernon Harry Hall, lately Station Officer, Group Mobile Squad, L.C.C. Heavy Rescue Service.
- Edward Albert Hamilton, Fireman, SS Orchy (William Sloan & Company).
- Frederick Arthur Hamilton, Carpenter, SS Empire Gantry (Moss Hutchison Line Ltd.).
- Hilda Phyllis Hamilton, Observer, Royal Observer Corps.
- Frederick Alfred Hammant, Machine Shop Foreman, Pilot Radio Ltd.
- Irene Phyllis Hammond, lately Voluntary Worker, Civil Defence Casualty Services, Pembroke Dock.
- Frank Hampshire, Foreman, Samuel Fox & Company Ltd.
- William Hancox, Greaser, SS Blyth (London, Midland & Scottish Railway Company).
- William George Hanslip, Mill Foreman, Pagart, Morgan & Coles Ltd.
- Norah Harding, Senior Woman Worker, Young Men’s Christian Association. For services to the Forces in Germany.
- Edward Hare, Foreman, Henry Browne & Sons Ltd.
- Frederick Hargreaves, Head Machine Shop Foreman, R. & W. Hawthorn Leslie & Company Ltd.
- James Hargy, Fireman, SS Prestatyn Rose (Richard Hughes & Company).
- William Harper, Engineers' Messman, SS Arundel Castle (Union Castle Mail Steamship Company Ltd.).
- Thomas Harpley, Foreman, English Electric Company Ltd.
- Charles Alfred Lawrence Harris, Works Foreman, William Griffith & Sons Ltd.
- Edmund Amos Harris, Chief Observer, Royal Observer Corps.
- Stanley George Harris, Deputy Office Keeper, Parliamentary Counsel.
- William John Harris, Mechanic, Philip & Son Ltd.
- Harry Harrison, Senior Foreman, McMichael Radio Ltd.
- John Harrison, Pump Attendant, Dumbreck Colliery.
- Samuel Harrison, Chief Engineer of a Steam Trawler.
- Teah Harrison, Head Fireman, SS Jonathan Holt (John Holt & Company (Liverpool) Ltd.).
- John Hart, Donkeyman, SS Glamorgan Coast (Coast Lines Ltd.).
- Ada Hartley, Welfare Worker, Western Command, War Office.
- Hilda Margaret Hartley, Assistant Supervisor, Class I (Telephones), Harrogate.
- Thomas Hartley, Skilled Labourer (Leading Hand), Admiralty Signal Establishment.
- Roland Victor Harvey, lately Staff Officer, Civil Defence Rescue Service, Eastbourne.
- Joseph William Harwood, District Storekeeper, Sea Transport Stores (Liverpool), Ministry of War Transport.
- Geneste Hatton, Quartermaster, SS Tactician (T. & J. Harrison).
- Henry Hatton, Road Foreman, Romford. For services to Civil Defence.
- Charles Henry Hawke, JP, Sub-Postmaster, Mitchell, Summercourt, Cornwall.
- Herbert William Hawkins, lately Party Leader, Civil Defence and Rescue Service, Yaxley, Hants.
- Ricnard Henry Hawkins, Inspector, First Police Reserve, Birmingham. For services to Civil Defence.
- Fred Hawksby, Senior Shop Steward, Rowntree & Company Ltd.
- John Thomas Hawley, Head Stock-keeper, Joint War Organisation of the British Red Cross Society & Order of St. John.
- Albert Haydock, Foreman, Rubber Regenerating Company Ltd.
- Elizabeth Hayes, Omnibus Conductress, Southampton Corporation.
- Anthony Henry Hayter, Overseer, Admiralty Gun Mounting Store, Belfast.
- Ronald Charles Crofton Hayward, lately Chief Warden, Civil Defence, Warden's Service, Stradbroke, East Suffolk.
- William Edwin Hayward, Tool Room Foreman, Baughan Engineers (Stroud) Ltd.
- Richard Edward Heal, Hired Storehouse Assistant, Naval Store Department, Milford Haven.
- Henry William Hearson, Chargeman Shipwright, Amos & Smith Ltd.
- Herbert William Stephen Heffer, Inspector (Reigate), London Passenger Transport Board.
- Sidney Ernest Helliar, Resident Overlooker, Howard & Sons, Ltd.
- Mabel Hemming, Capstan Operator, Austin Motor Company.
- Frederick William Hemmings, General Foreman, General Electric Company Ltd.
- Jabez Hemmingsley, Leading Electric Welder, Wellington Tube Works Ltd.
- Charles Edwin Henrickson, Foreman Shipwright, W. H. Thickett & Company.
- Thomas Henry, Greaser, SS Longford (Belfast Steamship Company Ltd.).
- Ethel Mary Hepworth, Assistant Area Officer, No. 4 (Leeds) Area, National Fire Service.
- Elizabeth Herbin, Grade "A" Machinist, Royal Ordnance Factory, Fazakerley.
- Frederick Herring, Corporal, Ambulance Unit, Joint War Organisation of the British Red Cross Society & Order of St. John.
- Thomas Henry Higham, Depot Ambulance Officer, Civil Defence Casualty and Rest Centre Service, Norwich.
- Jane Hignett, Fitter, D. Napier & Son, Ltd.
- Jean Hart Hill, Ambulance Driver, Joint War Organisation of the British Red Cross Society and Order of St. John.
- John Hill, Winding Engineman, Pinxton Collieries Ltd.
- Norman Hill, Senior Foreman, Whipp & Bourne Ltd.
- Joseph Hillary, Shifter, Stargate Colliery.
- Thomas Henry Hill, Senior Artificer, Admiralty Signal Establishment.
- William Dixon Hillcoat, Foreman Joiner (Dock), John Readhead & Sons Ltd.
- Alfred Hillier, Leading Supervisor, Anglo-Iranian Oil Company Ltd.
- Arthur Edward Hipkin, Civilian Barrack Officer, R.A.F. Station, Andover.
- Florence Hobbs, Chief Telephone Operator, Rotax Ltd.
- Jack Edward Hodge, Foreman, Eastern National Omnibus Co. Ltd.
- James Hodge, Mine Driver, Lindsay Colliery.
- Mary Ann Hodges, lately Shelter WeLfare Officer, Metropolitan Borough of Southwark.
- Frederick Arthur Holbrough, Working Mill Foreman, William S. Toms, Ltd.
- Joseph Holdenby, Foreman Woodworker, Morrell Mills & Company Ltd.
- Thomas Holland, Chargeman of Blacksmiths, Royal Naval Boom Depot, Rosyth.
- Rosaline Sarah Hollins, Temporary Postwoman, London Postal Region.
- Norman Holmes, Shift Manager, Milford Engineering Company (Huddersfield) Ltd.
- Rowland Thomas Hooker, Inspector, Oxfordshire County Constabulary. For services to Civil Defence.
- William Hopkins, Foreman, Richardsons, Westgarth & Company, Ltd.
- Alice Hopper, Electrical Fitter, Metropolitan Police Main Repair Depot.
- Alexander Victor Horne, Principal Foreman of Stores, Royal Aircraft Establishment.
- Elinor Horsford, Head of Packing Room, Joint War Organisation of the British Red Cross Society & Order of St. John.
- John Geoffrey Horton, lately Staff Officer, Civil Defence Light Rescue Service, Wandsworth.
- Reginald Hoskin, Chargeman of Storewrights, HM Dockyard, Chatham.
- John Collins Howard, Store Keeper, Ministry of Supply Storage Depot.
- Harry Heaton Howarth, Lamptrimmer, SS Adviser (T. & J. Harrison).
- Lawrence Victor Howe, Principal Foreman, Royal Aircraft Establishment.
- John Joseph Howell, Chief Observer, Royal Observer Corps.
- Victor Frederick Howells, Chief Steward, SS Woodlark (General Steam Navigation Company Ltd.).
- Archibald Frank Howick, Mess Room Steward, SS Empire Coleridge (Anglo-American Oil Company Ltd.).
- Maud Isabell Hoye, Manageress, Admiralty Luncheon Club.
- Thomas Henry Hubbard, Universal Milling Machine Operator, Imperial Typewriter Company Ltd.
- Mary Elizabeth Hughes, Sergeant, Ambulance Unit, Joint War Organisation of the British Red Cross Society and Order of St. John.
- William Thomas Hughes, Chargehand, Electric Construction Company Ltd.
- William John Humphries, Acting Head Forester, Forestry Commission.
- George Hunt, Member of the Staff of HM Embassy, Buenos Aires.
- William Hunter, Shepherd Manager, Bell Challum, Ltd., Killin.
- David Hutcheson, Established Shipwright, HM Dockyard, Chatham.
- William Hutcheson, Foreman Joiner, Miller Insulation Company Ltd.
- Alexander Henry Allen Hyland, Driver, Joint War Organisation of the British Red Cross Society & Order of St. John.
- Lloyd Colin Ifould, Liaison Engineer, British Overseas Airways Corporation.
- Edward Horatio Ing, Temporary Foreman, Royal Ordnance Factory, Bishopton.
- Norman Murray Ingledew, lately Divisional Warden, Civil Defence Wardens Service, Glamorgan.
- Frederick John Ingram, Chargehand-in-Charge, Royal Naval W/T Station, Goonhavern.
- James Irvin, Head Repair Iron Foreman, William Gray & Company Ltd.
- Thomas Irvine, Head Foreman, Bulls Metal & Melloid Company.
- Federeick Arthur Irving, Cook of a Steam Trawler.
- James Irving, Boatswain, SS Dunster Grange (Houlder Line Ltd.).
- William Frederick Isherwood, Foreman Engineer, Cardiff Channel Dry Dock & Pontoon Company Ltd.
- Edgar Noel Jackaman, lately Liaison Officer to County ARP Controller, East Suffolk.
- Emily Jackson, Member, Women's Land Army, Monmouthshire.
- Hugh Hodgkiss Jackson, Chief Observer, Royal Observer Corps.
- Victor William Jackson, Senior Draughtsman, Electrical Engineering Department, Admiralty.
- William Jackson, Principal Blast Furnace Foreman, Cargo Fleet Iron Company Ltd.
- Charles Llewellyn James, Assistant Head of Traffic Section, Swansea Docks.
- Henry Vivian James, lately Instructor, Civil Defence Rescue Service, Berkshire.
- Harrison Jameson, DCM, Storeholder A, Northern Command, War Office.
- Patricia Durant Jarvis, Member, Women's Land Army, Evesham.
- Frederick Charles Jeffery, Temporary Clerk of Works, Ministry of Works.
- Arthur Alfred Jevons, lately Group Officer, Eastern Regional Column, Civil Defence Reserve.
- John Sidney Johnson, Foreman, J. B. Marr Ltd.
- Frederick Sinclair Johnston, Skilled Workman, Class II, Post Office Telephone Area, Kirkwall.
- George Bisset Johnston, Able Seaman, SS Kingsborough (P. W. Hendry & Sons).
- William Johnstone, Chief Shop Foreman, Scottish Machine Tool Corporation Ltd.
- Edward Joinson, Foreman Shipwright, William Cubbins Ltd.
- Brigid Jones, Cook, Darnaway Auxiliary Hospital, Forres. For services to Civil Defence.
- Henry Jones, Greaser, MV Durban Castle (Union Castle Mail Steam Ship Company).
- James Jones, lately Collier, Deep Duffryn Colliery.
- James Jones, Overman, Hamstead Colliery.
- Kathleen Beryl Jones, Sergeant, Ambulance Unit, Joint War Organisation of the British Red Cross Society & Order of St. John.
- Samuel Percival Jones, Engineer, Grade II, British Overseas Airways Corporation.
- Thomas John Jones, Boatswain, SS Empire Trumper (J. & J. Harrison).
- William Jones, Boatswain, SS Empire Regent (T. & J. Brooklebank Ltd.).
- William Jones, Boatswain, SS Cambria (London, Midland & Scottish Railway Company).
- William Jones, Able Seaman, SS Icewhale (Anglesey Shipping Company Ltd.).
- William Jones, Observer, Royal Observer Corps.
- William David Jones, Engine Test Superintendent, Bristol Aeroplane Company Ltd.
- Edward James Joss, lately Deputy ARP Controller and Civil Defence Training Officer, Arbroath.
- Hilda Jowers, Deputy in Charge, Women's Voluntary Services Canteen, Darlington Station.
- Frederick Charles Henry Joyce, lately Party Supervisor, Civil Defence Heavy Rescue Service, East Ham.
- James Walter Sudbury Judge, Depot Manager, House Coal Distribution (Emergency), Scheme, Sheffield.
- John Kane, Blast Furnace Rigger, John Lysaght Ltd.
- Shiek Jainoo Bawa Kapri, Deck Serang, MV British Diligence (British Tanker Company).
- Kasibulla Agil Mohammed, Engine Room Serang, SS Martand (Thos. & Jno. Brocklebank Ltd.).
- George Henry Marriott Keen, Inspector, Post Office, Leamington Spa.
- Frederick William Keep, General Foreman, Southampton Docks, Southern Railway Company.
- Charles Keeper, lately Chief Warden, Civil Defence Wardens Service, East Bedfordshire.
- Thomas Keilly, Fireman of a Steam Trawler.
- Daniel Kelly, Foreman, Royal Ordnance Factory, Risley.
- Kenneth Montague Kemp, Chargehand Wireman, Ministry of Aircraft Production.
- William. Charles Kennard, Foreman of Storehouses, Naval Store Department, Admiralty.
- Margaret Kennedy, Wireless and Assembly Operative, A. C. Cossor, Ltd.
- Thomas Willits Kennedy, Foreman Electrical Fitter, North Eastern Electric Supply Company Ltd.
- John Kennett, Foreman of Storehouses, Royal Naval Store Depot, Bombay.
- Charles Stanley Kerredge, Foreman-Electrician, Blackburn Aircraft Ltd.
- Albert Kershaw, Ganger, Ruston Bucyrus Ltd.
- William Henry Kightley, Emergency Repair Overseer, Admiralty Outstation.
- Robert Kimber, Chargeman of Electrical Fitters, Admiralty.
- Edith King, Paint Shop Chargehand, General Gas Appliances Ltd.
- Ernest John King, Chargehand Grade I, Royal Naval W/T Station, Scarborough.
- Matthew King, lately Party Leader, Civil Defence Rescue Service, York.
- William Ernest King, Chief Observer, Royal Observer Corps.
- Herbert Kington, Senior Foreman, Universal Grinding Wheel Company, Ltd.
- Charles Ford Kingwell, Chargeman of Joiners, Brigham & Cowan (Hull) Ltd.
- William Kinsey, Oiler, SS Monarch of Bermuda (Furness, Withy & Company Ltd.).
- Joseph Kirkwood, Plater, Cammell Laird & Company Ltd.
- George Alfred Kitching, Chief Inspector, West Yorkshire Road Car Company Ltd.
- Robert Knife, Plant Inspector, Post Office (London) Railway, London Postal Region.
- John Knight, Head of Prototype Department, Radio Gramophone Development Company Ltd.
- David Bannerman Knowles, Chief Engineer of a Steam Trawler.
- Stanley Kynman, Foreman of Fitters, Amos & Smith, Ltd.
- John Laing, Inspector, Aberdeen Police Force. For services to Civil Defence.
- Lall Mahomed X Nolen Bux, Engine Room Cassab, SS Empire Malacca (Thos. & Jno. Brocklebank Ltd.).
- Henry Albert Lamb, Driver, Metropolitan Police Main Repair Depot, Hendon.
- Robert Henry Lancaster, Chargeman of Platers, Humber Shipwright Company Ltd.
- Arthur William Lapham, Civilian Instructor (Wireless Operator Mechanic), No. 1 Radio School, Royal Air Force.
- Walter Latchem, Coal miner, Writhlington Colliery Company.
- Walter Kennedy Laurie, Senior Company Officer (No. 26 Liverpool Area), National Fire Service.
- George Law, Able Seaman and Quartermaster, MV Port Wyndham (Port Line Ltd.).
- Ann Clarissa Lawrence, Light Capstan Operator, Sim's Motor Units Ltd.
- Marion White Lawson, lately Tool Setter, Blackwood Morton & Sons Ltd.
- Iolanda Laycock, Mechanised Transport Corps Driver, Royal Ordnance Factory, Kirby.
- Muriel Hobhouse Leacock, Manageress, Services Club, Combined Operations Headquarters.
- Hugh Leadbetter, Manager of Fish Sales, Consolidated Fisheries, Swansea.
- Richard Percy Legg, lately District Warden, Civil Defence Wardens Service, Woolwich.
- George Leman, Foreman of Erecting Shop, Laurence Scott & Electromotors Ltd.
- Charles Edward Lemon, Transport Manager, Home Canteen Service, Navy, Army and Air Force Institutes.
- John Harold Leng, Foreman Carpenter, Admiralty Salvage Base, West Hartlepool.
- William Lockhart Letham, Engine Driver (Mallaig), London & North Eastern Railway Company.
- Cecil Gooderham Levett, Sub-Divisional Inspector, Metropolitan Police.
- John Edmund Lewis, Foreman, Pirelli-General Cable Works Ltd.
- William James Henry Lewis, Chargeman of Depot Workmen, Royal Naval Boom Depot, Rosyth.
- Winifred Lewis, lately Welfare Officer, Royal Herbert Hospital, Woolwich.
- Dorothy Liddiard, Labour and Welfare Officer, Ultra Electric Ltd.
- John Lightfoot, Greaser, SS Queen of Bermuda (Furness Withy & Company Ltd.).
- Edwin Cecil Lillicrap, Inspector of Engine Fitters, Royal Naval Base, Aberdeen.
- Alfred Lillington, Chargeman of Iron Caulkers, HM Dockyard, Portsmouth.
- Frederick James Linforth, Temporary Foreman of Works, Admiralty.
- Francis Thomas Lipscomb, Chief Storekeeper, United Kingdom Commercial Corporation, Persia.
- Albert Lister, Plumber and Gas Fitter, East Hull Gas Company.
- Thomas Little, lately Divisional Operations Officer, Civil Defence Service, Willesden.
- Edgar Littlejohn, Electrical Overseer, Admialty Outstation.
- William Garrett Littlejohn, lately Head of Civil Defence Rescue & Decontamination Services, Leicestershire.
- Colin Livingston, Head Foreman, Mechans Ltd.
- Thomas William Locke, Casting Inspector, Ford Motor Company.
- Charles Logan, Head Fireman, SS Godfrey B. Holt (John Holt & Company (Liverpool) Ltd.).
- Ethel Long, in charge of Norwich (Thorpe) Station Canteen, Joint War Organisation of the British Red Cross Society & Order of St. John.
- Howard John Long, Observer, Royal Observer Corps.
- Thomas Henry Albert Long, Principal Foreman of Storehouses, Royal Naval Armament Depot, Upnor.
- Robert William Longley, Engine-room Storekeeper (Pumpman), MV Empire Maccoll (British Tanker Company Ltd.).
- George Longstaff, Boatswain, SS Custodian (Charente Steamship Company Ltd.).
- Louis Bertrand Loveridge, Chief Inspector, Bedford Police Force. For services to Civil Defence.
- Harold Victor Lowles, lately Senior Warden, Civil Defence Wardens Service, Hastings.
- Reginald Eugene Day-Luce, lately Assistant Staff Officer (Decontamination) Civil Defence Rescue Service, Portsmouth.
- John Alexander Lumsden, Cook, MV Clova (Dundee, Perth & London Shipping Company Ltd.).
- John Robert Lynch, Chief Telephone Operator, Fulham Installation Exchange, Petroleum Board.
- Vera Hinchcliffe Lynfield, Assistant Group Officer, No. 5 (London) Regional Headquarters, National Fire Service.
- Harold Frank Mabbett, Chargeman of Engine Fitters, HM Dockyard, Portsmouth.
- Donald McAskill, Able Seaman, SS Cameronia (Anchor Line Ltd.).
- Joseph McCabe, Sub Foreman, Glasgow Docks.
- Gwynedd McCallum, Deputy County Borough Organiser, Exeter, Women's Voluntary Services.
- Phyllis McCarthy, Ambulance Driver, London County Council Auxiliary Ambulance Service.
- Georgina McChesney, Depot Manager, House Coal Distribution (Emergency) Scheme, Glasgow.
- Mary Agnes McCullough, Thread Worker, Henry Campbell & Company Ltd.
- Flora Murchison Macdonald, Chief Observer, Royal Observer Corps.
- Thomas McDonald, Foreman Electrician, Wallsend Slipway & Engineering Company Ltd.
- Patrick Paul McDonnell, Foreman Engineer, India Tyre & Rubber Company Ltd.
- Arthur McElheron, Storekeeper, SS Cordillera (Donald Line Ltd.).
- James McGee, Foreman Joiner, James Lamont & Company Ltd.
- Charles McGeorge, Coppersmith (Chargehand), M. W. Swinburne & Sons Ltd.
- John McGrath, Transport Driver, Downer & Company Ltd.
- Andrew McGregor, Foreman Electrician, John Willis & Sons.
- James Sinclair McGregor, Architectural and Civil Engineering Assistant Grade II, War Office.
- Monica McGrigor, Nursing Auxiliary, British Red Cross Society.
- Josephine McGuire, Member, Scottish Women's Land Army, Edinburgh.
- James McIntosh, Donkeyman, SS Lakeland (Currie Line Ltd.).
- Francis Paul McIntyre, Chargeman Engineer, Blvth Dry Dock & Shipbuilding Company Ltd.
- John McIntyre, Chargeman of Labourers, Royal Naval Armament Depot, Crombie.
- Daniel McKenzie, Fireman, SS Horsa (Currie Line Ltd.).
- Kenneth MacKenzie, Principal Officer, HM Borstal Institution, Polmont.
- John McKerrell, Fireman, SS Lochdunvegan (David Macbrayne Ltd.).
- Francis McKeown, Foreman, Machines Department, Measurement Ltd.
- Murdo McKinnon, Master, Govan Vehicular Ferry, Glasgow.
- Neil McKinnon, Skipper of a Motor Fishing Boat.
- William Mitchell MacLachlan, Senior Repairs Foreman, British Auxiliaries Ltd.
- Irene Annie Eveline McLarnon, Manager, Sussex County Parcels Packing Centre, Hove, Joint War Organisation of the British Red Cross Society & Order of St. John.
- Charles McLean, Chief Engineer, Clyde Steamer Service, London North Eastern Railway Company.
- Robert Charles McLennan, Overseer, London Postal Region.
- Alfred Edward McLeod, Staff Officer, Civil Defence Rescue School, Dundee.
- Dorothy McMath, FANY, employed in a Department of the War Office.
- James Hill Smyth McNeill, Superintending Process Foreman, Imperial Chemical Industries Ltd.
- John MacNicol, Able Seaman, SS Skerries (Clyde Shipping Company Ltd.).
- Bernard McQueen, Foreman, Air Service Training Ltd.
- John McRury, Farm Manager, West Fife Agricultural Executive Committee.
- Dorothie Sylvia Maggi, Temporary Sorting Clerk, Post Office, Cardiff.
- Thomas Maker, Head Foreman, John & James White, Ltd.
- George William Main, Head Foreman Stevedore, Liverpool.
- Clarence Leslie Major, Inspector, Chesterfield Police Force. For services to Civil Defence.
- Edward Theaker Mallinson, Sergeant, Glamorgan Police. For services to Civil Defence.
- William Alexander Manders, Chief Inspector, Exeter City Police. For services to Civil Defence.
- Frederick William Mann, Signal & Telegraph Supervisor, Southern Railway Company.
- Betty Manser, FANY, employed in a Department of the War Office.
- William Manson, Head Foreman, Laird & Son Ltd.
- George Edward Maples, Senior Draughtsman, Electrical Engineering Department, Admiralty.
- David Samuel Maplethorpe, Assembly Fitter, Robey & Company Ltd.
- Lydia Margetts, lately Post Warden, Civil Defence Wardens Service, Poplar.
- Percy Stanley Marriott. Boatswain, MV Scottish Co-operator (Scottish Co-operative Wholesale Society Ltd.).
- George Marshall, Inspector, Aberdeen County Special Constabulary. For services to Civil Defence.
- William Marshall, Setter Grinder, J. Lucas Ltd.
- Ephraim Martin, Working Foreman Patternmaker, John Lewis & Sons Ltd.
- Sidney David Martin, Foreman, Boosey & Hawkes Ltd., Edgware.
- Doris Mary Martyn, Sergeant, Ambulance Unit, Joint War Organisation of the British Red Cross Society & Order of St. John.
- Alfred Charles Marzetti, Storehouseman, HM Victualling Sub-Depot, Staine's.
- Ethel Harriette Mason, Assistant Supervisor, Class II, London Telecommunications Region.
- Louis Lever Mason, lately Chief Warden, Civil Defence Wardens Service, Swadlincote, Derbyshire.
- Stanley Herbert Mason, Shop Foreman, S. G. Brown Ltd.
- William Massey, Able Seaman Lamptrimmer, SS Matching (Stephenson Clarke Ltd.).
- John Henry Massingham, Foreman, Agency Services (Burnham Beeches), Ministry of War Transport.
- James Henry Carside Mathers, War Reserve, Hull Police Force. For services to Civil Defence.
- Charles William Mathew, Storeholder B, Ministry of Supply.
- Ellen Matthews, Floor Inspector, Halex Ltd.
- George Edward Thomas Hayward Maund, Company Officer, No. 23 (Worcester) Area, National Fire Service.
- Reginald Frank Ivor Maunders, Cook, SS Watergate (Coppack Bros. & Company).
- Frederick Mawby, Chief Inspector, Air Ministry Constabulary.
- William Mawer, Boiler Plant Attendant, Colvilles Ltd.
- Benjamin Maxwell, Donkeyman, SS British Chancellor (British Tanker Company Ltd.).
- Charles May, Boiler-man, Mazawattee Tea Company Ltd.
- James Maynard, Charge-Hand, Metalair Ltd.
- Joseph Lewis Meadmore, lately Party Leader, Civil Defence Rescue Service, East Grinstead.
- Blanche Jessie Meads, Senior Examiner (W), Aeronautical Inspection Department, Ministry of Aircraft Production.
- Frank Meggitt, Tool and Gauge Maker, Royal Ordnance Factory, Poole.
- Edward Meiszner, Works Foreman, Lewis, Brooks & Company Ltd.
- William Meldrum, Skipper of a Motor Fishing Boat.
- John Elston Mellor, Maintenance Foreman, British Nylon Spinners Ltd.
- Harriet Helen Membery, Matron, Government Evacuation Scheme Hostel, Bourne End, Buckinghamshire.
- Arthur Harold Mercer, Foreman, London Passenger Transport Board.
- Eleanor Merrett, Clothing Representative, Wandsworth, Women's Voluntary Services.
- George Livingstone Merritt, Cook, SS Empire Geraint (Lamport & Holt Line Ltd.).
- Walter George Middleton, Principal Workshop Foreman of No. 2 Group Central R.E.M.E. Workshop, War Office.
- Harry Midgley, Senior Artificer, Admiralty Research Laboratory.
- Gertrude Victoria Millar, Senior Overlooker, Royal Ordnance Factory, Kirby.
- James Millar, Special Constable, Perth County Special Constabulary.
- Norman Grainger Millar, Boatswain, SS Parima (Royal Mail Lines Ltd).
- Charles Robert Miller, Foreman, Siemens Bros. & Company Ltd.
- John Scott Miller, Company Officer, Eastern Area of Scotland, National Fire Service.
- Herbert Fulton Miller, Universal Miller, Royal Aircraft Establishment, Farnborough, Ministry of Aircraft Production.
- William Alexander Miller, lately Head Warden, Civil Defence Wardens Service, Plymouth.
- Francis Christie Milne, Leading Ganger, Permanent Way Staff, Longmoor Military Railway.
- Joseph Congdon Mills, Chargeman of Riggers, HM Dockyard, Devonport.
- Frederick Milner Minter, Iron Moulder, E. R. & F. Turner Ltd.
- Charles Mitchell, Boiler Stoker, East Hull Gas Company.
- Methoo Choome Moguljan, Serang, SS Umgeni (Bullard, King & Company Ltd.).
- Charles Johanthan Monk, Chief Shop Steward, A. Hawkes & Company Ltd.
- Mary Frances Moody, Temporary Engineering Assistant (F.), Grade I, Post Office Military Telephone Exchange, Aldershot.
- Michael Mooney, Works Foreman, H. E. Nunn & Company Ltd.
- Harry Moore, Senior Foreman, Bakelite Ltd.
- Edward John Moran, Foreman, Armaments Inspection Department, Ministry of Supply-
- Ivor Owen Mordecai, Setter-up, Powell Puffryn Ltd.
- Annie Lilian Morgan, Canteen Manageress, Navy, Army and Air Force Institutes.
- Charles Albert Morgan, Inspector of Works, Air Ministry.
- Olwen May Morgan, General Labourer, Metalclad, Ltd.
- Douglas Edward Morrell, Chargehand, Carpentry Shop, Ministry of Aircraft Production.
- Dennis Raymond Morris, Assistant II, Aircraft Torpedo Development Unit, Ministry of Aircraft Production.
- Reginald William Morrish, Senior Examiner, Aeronautical Inspection Department, Ministry of Aircraft Production.
- Herbert Francis Morrison, Inspector of Storehousemen, Royal Naval Store Depot, Almondbank.
- James Arthur Morton, Inspector of Works (Buildings), Air Ministry.
- Henry Charles Moseley, Principal Foreman, Royal Aircraft Establishment, Farnborough, Ministry of Aircraft Production.
- James Mossop, Coal miner, Walkmill Colliery.
- Peter Mouat, Boatswain, MV Port Jackson (Port Line Ltd.).
- David Douglas Wilkie Moyes, Chief Steward, MV Neverita (Anglo-Saxon Petroleum Company Ltd.).
- George Moynham, Cabin Steward, SS Aorangi (Peninsula & Oriental Steam Navigation Company).
- Muckandsha Jaffersha, Engine Room Serang, SS Strathaird (Peninsular and Oriental Steam Navigation Company).
- Cyril Peter Mulford, Foreman of Stores, No. 27 Maintenance Unit, Royal Air Force.
- Godfrey Leslie Mulvey, Inspector of Electrical Fitters, Admiralty.
- Roy Ernest Mundy, Storehouseman, HM Victualling Sub-Depot, Woolston.
- William Archibald Munn, General Foreman, Maintenance Department, Severn Commissioners.
- Adam Munro, lately County Transport Officer, Civil Defence Service, Staffordshire.
- Alexander Munro, Skipper of a Motor Fishing Boat.
- John Munro, Temporary Postman, Thurso.
- James William Murphy, lately Chief Warden, Civil Defence Wardens Service, Seaton Valley, Northumberland.
- John Murphy, Boatswain, SS Ocean Strength (J. & J. Denholm Ltd.).
- Thomas Murphy, Foreman, Scottish Aviation Ltd.
- Catherine Martha Murray, Temporary Sorting Clerk and Telegraphist, Lerwick.
- James Murray, Skipper of a Motor Fishing Boat.
- Olive Milne Katherine Henry Myler, Observer, Royal Observer Corps.
- Mary Gilliatt Naylor, Centre Organiser, Lymington, Women's Voluntary Services.
- Robert Frederick Naylor, lately Depot Superintendent, Civil Defence Ambulance Service, Liverpool.
- Charles Neagus, Foreman, Harris Lebus Ltd.
- Thomas Neale, Outside Senior Foreman Engineer, Harland & Wolff Ltd.
- William Neilson, Brusher, Lady Victoria Colliery.
- Phyllis Newbold, Crane Driver, Stanton Ironworks Company Ltd.
- Harold Antridge Newcombe, Inspector of Storehousemen, HM Dockyard, Simonstown.
- James Henry Newham, Chargeman Joiner, Humber Graving Dock & Engineering Company.
- Ernest John Newman, Assistant Foreman, Wessex Aircraft Engineering Company Ltd.
- Stephen Richard Newman, lately Staff Officer, Civil Defence Wardens Service, Beckenham.
- Frank Newton, Shop Stewards Convener, A. C. Cossor Ltd.
- John Newton, Engineer Foreman, Vosper Ltd.
- Richard Henry Newton, Chef, SS Otranto (Orient Steam Navigation Company Ltd.).
- William Newton, lately Area Captain, Fire Guard Service, Scunthorpe.
- Dudley Nicholls, lately Honorary Treasurer, British Community Canteen, Tanta. For services to the Forces.
- Lily Cecilia Nicholls, Supervisor, Prisoner of War Food Parcels Packing Room, Joint War Organisation of the British Red Cross Society and Order of St. John.
- George Nichols, Chargehand, Laurence Scott & Company Ltd.
- George Charles Nichols, District Superintendent, London Passenger Transport Board.
- Mary Ethelwyn Nicholson, Leader, Church of Scotland Huts. For services to the Forces.
- Herbert Norman, employed in a Department of the Foreign Office.
- Ernest Norton, First Class Draughtsman, Engineer-in- Chief's Department, Admiralty.
- William Henry Nunn, Traffic Controller (Darlington), London and North Eastern Railway Company.
- William Arthur Nutkins, Receiver and Despatcher, Joint War Organisation of the British Red Cross Society and Order of St. John.
- Ernest William Nye, Engineering Inspector, Post Office Telephone Area, Canterbury.
- Alexander O'Brien, Assistant Wharfinger, J. & J. Mack & Sons Ltd.
- John O'Connell, Able Seaman, MV Paul Emile Javary (J. T. Salvesen & Company).
- John Ormandy, Oiler, SS Monarch of Bermuda (Furness Withy & Company Ltd.).
- Lilian Alice Orton, Member, Women's Lanol Army, Langford, Bristol.
- Arthur William Osborne. Employed in a Department of the War Office.
- William George Osgathorp, Driver, London Passenger Transport Board.
- Ruth M. Packe, General Supervisor, Prisoners of War Packing Centre, Leicester, Joint War Organisation of the British Red Cross Society and Order of St. John.
- Louis Packer, Foreman of Trades, No. 47 Maintenance Unit, Royal Air Force.
- Frank Page, Sawyer, Educational Supply Association Ltd.
- Fred Page, JP, Coal-getter, Wentworth Silkstone Colliery.
- George Henry Page, First Assistant, Allen West & Company Ltd.
- Edwin Herbert Keith Palmer, Overseer, Printing Press, HM Stationery Office.
- Wallace Henry Charles Palmer, Foreman, R. J. Coley & Sons.
- William Harold Palmer, Boatswain, MV Langibby Castle (Union-Castle Mail Steam Shipping Company).
- Harry Park, Foreman, Langbridge Ltd.
- Edith Arna Parker, Head Packer, Prisoners of War Food Packing Centre, Joint War Organisation of the British Red Cross Society & Order of St. John.
- Mary Charlton Parker, Tram Conductress, County Borough of Sunderland.
- William Parker, lately Warden, Civil Defence Wardens Service, Hull.
- Margaret Parkin, Charge-hand, Ferranti Ltd.
- Ernest Parramore, lately Chief Warden, Civil Defence Wardens Service, Penistone.
- Percy Thomas Parris, Foreman, Heath & Company.
- Blanche Amy Pearce, Corps Officer, St. John's Ambulance Brigade, Liverpool.
- Hilda Mildred Pearce, Temporary Postwoman Driver, Stroud.
- James Stanley Pearman, Assistant Chief Permanent Way Inspector, Southern Railway Company.
- Frank Pearson, Blast Furnace and Coke Oven Superintendent, Ford Motor Company, Ltd.
- Hutton Backhouse Pearson, Chief of Inspection, Cooke, Troughton & Simms Ltd.
- Sophie Pearson, Head Packer, Next of Kin Packing Centre, Joint War Organisation of the British Red Cross Society and Order of St. John.
- Joseph William Peasnell, Leading Hand, Huntley Boorne & Stevens Ltd.
- Margaret Edith Grace Pegg, Auxiliary Station Officer, London Auxiliary Ambulance Service.
- Stanley Pegg, Foreman Electrician, Broady & Son Ltd.
- George Frederick Pelling, Works Foreman, C. E. Welstead Ltd.
- Rhoda Kathleen Penn, Temporary Postwoman Driver, Petersfield.
- James Pennie, Depot Chargeman of Labourers, Royal Naval Boom Defence Depot, Scapa.
- Reginald Vivien Perkins, Foreman, Machine Shop, Ministry of Aircraft Production.
- Gladys Perman, Charge-hand, Philco Radio and Television Corporation.
- Albert Edward Perry, Charge-hand Marine Engine Fitter, Consolidated Fisheries Ltd.
- George Harold Henry Claude Petts, First Class Draughtsman, Boom Defence Department, Admiralty.
- Ivan Edgar Phillips, Warrant Officer, No. 262 (Ispwich) Squadron, Air Training Corps.
- Jane Thompson Phillips, Matron, Fleetham Lodge Sick Bay for Evacuated Children, Sunderland.
- Stanley Harry Phillips, lately Head Warden, Civil Defence Wardens Service, Cofton Hackett, Birmingham.
- William Phillips, Observer, Royal Observer Corps.
- Joseph William Pickering, Plumber, SS Orontes (Orient Steam Navigation Company, Ltd.).
- Arthur Thomas Picton, Chief Observer, Royal Observer Corps.
- Mary Olga Pidduck, lately Head Telephonist, Civil Defence Report Centre Staff, Newcastle Rural District.
- Stanley Piggins, lately ARP Sub-Controller and Chief Warden, East Elloe Rural District Areas.
- James Daniel Pigney, Erecting Shop Foreman, Sir W. G. Armstrong Whitworth Ltd.
- Robert Pike, Chargeman of Fitters, Palmers Hebburn Co., Ltd.
- William Pike, Master Pattern Cutter, Ministry of Supply.
- Horace Walter Pincott, Chief Warehouse Supervisor, HM Stationery Office.
- George Frederick Pine, Dock Gateman, Liverpool.
- Ernest Greenaway Piper, Donkeyman, SS Empire Marksman (William Coombs and Sons, Ltd.).
- Albert Edward Platt, lately Head Warden, Civil Defence Wardens Service, Conisborough District, West Riding of Yorkshire.
- Harry Cecil Wyatt Pollard, Head Foreman, Fraser and Chalmers Engineering Works.
- Alicia Delia Porta, Mechanised Transport Corps Driver, Ministry of Supply.
- Eric Clarkson Porter, Third Hand of a Steam Trawler.
- Horace Isaac George Pothecary, Constable, Metropolitan Special (Constabulary.
- Albert John Potter, Lighterman, Associated Portland Cement Manufacturers Ltd.
- Jack Bowland Potter, Inspector, Cheshire County. Police Force. For services to Civil Defence.
- Jeremiah Pottinger, Skipper of a Motor Fishing Boat.
- Albert Ernest Pover, Steward, SS Medway Coast (Coast Lines Ltd.).
- Charles Povey, Repairer, Michelin Tyre Co. Ltd.
- Norman Frederick Powell, Foreman Maintenance Engineer, Dunlop Rim and Wheel Co.
- Edward Victor Pratt, Sorter, London Postal Region.
- Walter William Pratt, Leading Fitter, London Midland and Scottish Railway Company.
- Edwin Watson Pratten, Factory Foreman, General Post Office.
- Ernest Jesse Prew, District Officer, Joint War Organisation of the British Red Cross Society and Order of St. John.
- Maude Adelaide Price, Head of Packing Room, Sussex County Parcels Packing Centre, Joint War Organisation of the British Red Cross Society and Order of St. John.
- Frederick Arthur Prickett, Senior Draughtsman, Engineer-in-Chiefs Department, Admiralty.
- John Albert Priestley, Transport Worker, Grimsby.
- Frederick Edgar Prince, Supervising Officer, Rest Centre Service, London County Council.
- Henry George Prior, Toolroom Turner, Stratford Locomotive Works, London and North Eastern Railway Company.
- James Henry Prior, Motor Transport Driver, Royal Ordnance Factory, Bridgwater.
- George Proud, Chargeman Electrician, Middle Docks and Engineering Company, Ltd.
- Ethne Phillipa Pryor, Deputy Organiser, Prisoner of War Parcels Packing Centre, Hertfordshire, Joint War Organisation of the British Red Cross Society and Order of St. John.
- Ann Puddock, lately Cook-Caterer, Priestly Nurseries Ltd. For services to Civil Defence.
- Sidney Tom Pugh, Locomotive Running Inspector, Great Western Railway Company.
- Edith Frances Pullen, lately Member, Mobile Civil Defence First Aid Post, Bristol.
- Frank Edgar James Puttock, Goods Agent, Angerstein Wharf, Southern Railway Company.
- Ivor Sylvanus Kirton Quest, Skilled Workman, Class I, Telephone Manager's Office, Liverpool Telephone Area.
- Jack Rackstraw, Senior Foreman, Dynatron Radio Ltd.
- Donald Ralph, Mate of a Steam Trawler.
- The Reverend John Ramsay, Chief Observer, Royal Observer Corps.
- John Ratcliffe, Foreman, John Tompson Beacon Windows Ltd.
- Ernest Arthur Rattenbury, Leading Hand, Auto-Klean Strainers Ltd.
- Arthur Rawson, Inspector, Scarborough Police Force. For services to Civil Defence.
- Albert Cecil Read, Superphosphate Plant Operator, Anglo-Continental Guano Works Ltd.
- Violet Ann Reading, lately Lay Superintendent, Civil Defence First Aid Post, Portsmouth.
- Hubert Redmill, Temporary Draughtsman, Air Ministry.
- Bertie Reed, Greaser, MV Energie (Shell Mex & B.P. Ltd.).
- William James Charles Reeves, Acting Inspector of Electrical Fitters, Admiralty Outstation.
- Cyllene Leicester Reid, Centre Organiser, Horsham, Women's Voluntary Services.
- Captain George Halley Knight Reid, lately Divisional Warden, Civil Defence Wardens Service, Southampton.
- George Henry Reid, Inspector, Chatham and District Traction Company.
- George Wyse Reid, Tool Room Foreman, R. & A. Main Ltd.
- Jessie Stevens Reid, Storekeeper, Static Condenser Company Ltd.
- William Reid, Fireman, SS Fort Slave (McCowen & Gross Ltd.).
- May Reynolds, Assembler (Radar Equipment), Metropolitan Vickers Electrical Company Ltd.
- William Riach, Foreman Ship Joiner, J. V. Hepburn & Company.
- Lilian Margery Richards, lately Voluntary Worker, Civil Defence Ambulance Service, Cardiff.
- Thomas Edward Richards, Inspector of Patternmakers, HM Dockyard, Sheerness.
- William James Richards, Temporary Experimental Assistant I, Admiralty.
- Holfar Theodore Richardson, Donkeyman, SS Empire Fal (Chellew Navigation Company Ltd.).
- Elizabeth Hilda Ridley, Head Packer, Prisoners of War Food Packing Centre, Joint War Organisation of the British Red Cross Society and Order of St. John.
- Leonard John Riley, Sorting Clerk and Telegraphist, Manchester.
- Thomas Rimmer, General Works Foreman, Littlewoods Mail Order Stores, Ltd.
- Ewan Ritchie, Porter, Food Parcels Packing Depot, Perth, Joint War Organisation of the British Red Cross Society and Order of St. John.
- William Savage Ritchie, Superintending Foreman, Ministry of Supply Factory, Powfoot.
- Sydney Robbins, Established Armament Fitter, Royal Naval Torpedo Depot, Portsmouth.
- Arthur Roberts, JP, Chairman of Shop Stewards, Vickers-Armstrongs Ltd.
- Irene Maud Roberts, lately Staff Officer, Civil Defence Wardens Service, Newport.
- Robert John Roberts, Leading Roller, Aluminium Corporation Ltd.
- Andrew Robertson, Able Seaman, SS Masunda (Maclay & Mclntyre Ltd.).
- George Robertson, Resident Fireman, Tyne Improvement Commission, Northumberland & Albert Edward Docks.
- Thomas Herbert Robertson, Company Officer, Western No. 2 Area of Scotland, National Fire Service.
- Ruby Robins, Member, Women's Land Army, Anglesey.
- Sydney Lloyd Robinson, Engineer, Masteradio Ltd.
- William Robinson, Boatswain, SS Sapedon (Alfred Holt & Company).
- Henry Robson, Head Iron Foreman, Swan Hunter & Wigham Richardson Ltd.
- William Arthur Roby, Charge Hand, Ford Motor Company Ltd.
- Alfred Rodger, Shop Manager, Vickers-Armstrongs Ltd.
- John Rodriguez, Principal Storekeeper, War Department, Gibraltar.
- William Rogers, Sergeant, Cheshire County Constabulary. For services to Civil Defence.
- William Rogers, Mechanical Foreman (London), Great Western Railway Company.
- William Rohrs, Chief Steward, SS City of Keelung (Ellerman & Bucknall Steamship Company Ltd.).
- Stanley Lawrence Rolfe, in charge of workshop, Fidelity Engineering Company Ltd.
- Irene Ross, Driver, Ambulance Unit, Joint War Organisation of the British Red Cross Society and Order of St. John.
- Vera Mary, Countess of Rosslyn, Head Packer, Prisoners of War Food Packing Centre, Joint War Organisation of the British Red Cross Society and Order of St. John.
- Arthur William Rouse, Quartermaster, SS Marcharda (Thos. & Jno. Brocklebank Ltd.).
- Albert Ernest Rowell, Steward, SS Empire Oykell (Sir R. Ropner & Company Ltd.).
- Stuart James Rudd, Machine Shop Foreman, Wilson & Kyle.
- Frederick Thomas Edward Rusby, Temporary Sorting Clerk and Telegraphist, Leeds.
- James Rusk, Electrical Foreman, Sunderland Forge & Engineering Company Ltd.
- Eric Russell, Assistant Engineer, Bristol Docks.
- George Henry Russell, Foreman Packer, Joint War Organisation of the British. Red Cross Society & Order of St. John.
- John Thomas Russell, Office Keeper, Office of HM Procurator General and Treasury Solicitor.
- John Ruxton, Carpenter-Pumpman, MV D. L. Harper (Anglo-American Oil Company Ltd.).
- William Ryan, Fireman, SS Samdonard (McCowan & Gross Ltd.).
- George Henry Rycroft, employed in Department of War Office.
- Minnie Sage, Technical Assistant Grade II, Air Ministry.
- Said Ahmed Maydoo, Serang, SS Castalia (Anchor Line Ltd.).
- Francis Henry Salt, Engineer, J. & N. Philips Ltd.
- Samat Bin Samat, Boatswain, SS Everleigh (W. J. Tatem Ltd.).
- Charles Reed Sanderson, Senior Examiner, Aeronautical Inspection Department, Ministry of Aircraft Production.
- Joseph Cowie Sannick, Donkeyman and Greaser, SS Bury (Wilsons and North Eastern Railway Shipping).
- Sidney Alfred Sargent, lately Staff Officer, Civil Defence Rescue Services, Hornchurch.
- Andrew Moody Saunders, Chargeman of Shipwrights, HM Dockyard, Portsmouth.
- Eric Saunders. Printer, Thomas de la Rue Ltd.
- Joseph Savona, Acting Local Foreman of Storehouses, HM Dockyard, Malta.
- Daniel Patrick Scanlon, Station Officer, HM Coastguard Service.
- Kenneth Schofheld, Assembly Foreman, A.B. Gyros, Ferranti Ltd.
- Lorenzo Sciberras, Master Stevedore, HM Dockyard, Malta.
- Florence Scott, Supervisor of Cleaners, Registry of Friendly Societies.
- Geoffrey Frederick Scott, General Foreman, Stanlow Oil Refinery.
- John, Scott, Chargeman Boilermaker, Middle Dock & Engineering Company, Ltd.
- Walter Gilbert Scott, Leading Driver, Pickfords Ltd.
- William John Seager, Inspector, Reading Police Force. For services to Civil Defence.
- Leslie William Seal, lately Air Raid Precautions Officer, Swanscombe.
- Edwin Sellen, Head Foreman Plumber, Swan Hunter & Wigham Richardson Ltd.
- Albert Henry Arthur Sendall, Chargeman of Shipwrights, HM Naval Base, Lyness.
- James Service, Inspector, Dumfriesshire Constabulary.
- Gertrude Elizabeth Sewards, Chargehand, Zenith Electric Company, Ltd.
- John Sewell, Overseer, Head Post Office, Belfast.
- William Sewell, Miner, Allerdale Coal Company Limited.
- Sidney Seymour, Station Engineer, British Overseas Airways Corporation, Calcutta.
- Florence Laura Whitfield Shadrick, Telegraphist, Central Telegraph Office, General Post Office.
- Albert Edward Shannon, Depot Manager, House Coal Distribution (Emergency) Scheme, Birmingham.
- Nathanial Sharp, lately District Warden, Civil Defence Wardens Service, Islington.
- Francis Hannah Sharpe, lately Overlooker, Royal Ordnance Factory, Thorp Arch.
- Harry Sharpe, Foreman, Jowett Cars Ltd.
- John Shaw, Chief Inspector (Engineering), Post Office Telephone Area, Truro.
- Charlotte Sheard, Senior Works Supervisor, Thos. Ward & Sons Ltd.
- Magnus Shearer, Able Seaman, SS Fort Pembina (Stanhope Steamship Company Ltd.).
- Sidney John Shearman, MM, Chief Observer, Royal Observer Corps.
- Charles Edward Sheene, Assistant Superintendent, Postal Censorship Branch, Ministry, of Information.
- Percy Henry Sheffield, Highways Foreman, Hadfield, Ministry of War Transport.
- Marjorie Shellard, Temporary Sorting Clerk and Telegraphist, Bath.
- Frederic George Shelvey, Inspector, Leicester Police Force. For services to Civil Defence.
- Francis Henry Sheppard, Post Office Contract Driver, Knee Bros.
- Edward Shimmins, Coal Face Worker, Sheepbridge Coal & Iron Company Ltd.
- Archibald Clifford Short, Quartermaster, SS Dinard (Southern Railway Company).
- Archibald Frank Short, First Class Draughtsman, Torpedo and Mining Department, Admiralty.
- Frank Herbert Allan Sibley, Principal Foreman of Stores, No. 232 Maintenance Unit, Royal Air Force.
- Marshall Wentworth Sillifant, Inspector of Boilermakers, Admiralty Outstation.
- George Robert Silvester, Assistant Foreman, Mullard Radio Valve Company Ltd.
- James Simpson, Temporary Sorting Clerk and Telegraphist, Carlisle.
- Margaret Helen Simpson, Nursing Auxiliary, British Red Cross Society.
- Walter William John Simpson, Inspector, Ipswich County Borough Police. For services to Civil Defence.
- William Simpson, Collector in charge, Bow and Limehouse Locks, Lee Conservancy.
- John Thomas Sims, Greaser, SS Samderwent (Cayzer, Irvine & Company Ltd.).
- Lawrence Robert Sinclair, Boatswain, SS Camberwell (South Metropolitan Gas Company).
- William Singleton, Electrical Fitter, HM Dockyard, Portsmouth.
- Alfred Skinner, Company Officer, No. 37 (London) Headquarters National Fire Service.
- George Slaney, Timber Drawer and Packer, Staveley Coal & Iron Company Ltd.
- Albert Slim, Grinder, Birmingham Small Arms Company Ltd.
- Frank Benjamin Smallwood, First Class Draughtsman, Admiralty.
- Thomas Smiles, Heavy Haulage Foreman, Newcastle.
- Alice Smith, Sorter, Postal Censorship Branch, Ministry of Information.
- Andrew Walker Smith, Boilermaker, North-Eastern Marine Engineering Company (1938) Ltd.
- Charles Smith, Drydock Foreman (Southampton Docks), Southern Railway Company.
- Charles Smith, Deputy, Hamstead Colliery.
- Edmund Lewis Smith, Sheet Metal Worker, Radio Production Unit, Ministry of Aircraft Production.
- Ferguson Baxter Smith, Sorting Clerk and Telegraphist, Perth.
- George Smith, Assistant Foreman, Armaments Inspection Department, Ministry of Supply.
- George Albert Smith, Foreman, Experimental Bridging Establishment, Ministry of Supply.
- Henry Smith, Driver, Alexanders, Road Transport Contractors.
- Herbert Thomas Smith, Skilled Workman, Class I, Chester Telephone Area.
- James Robert Smith, Motor Driver, Stores Department, General Post Office.
- Job Smith, Dock Labourer, Port of London Authority.
- John Smith, Boatswain, SS Wanderer (T. J. Harrison).
- John Smith, Foreman Electrician, Cammell Laird & Company Ltd.
- John Nelson Smith, Observer, Royal Observer Corps.
- John Ogilive Smith, Skipper of a Motor Fishing Boat.
- Margeurite Emma Smith, Canteen Manageress, Navy, Army and Air Force Institutes.
- William George Smith, Assistant Inspector, Ministry of Supply, Inspection Board of United Kingdom and Canada.
- William Nash Smith, Wireless Telegraphist, HMTS Iris.
- Daniel Snaddon, Pumpman, Devon Colliery.
- Jack Barrington Snell, Chief Observer, Royal Observer Corps.
- Wolfe Solomon, lately Senior Assistant Fire Guard Officer and Training Officer, Cleethorpes.
- Frederick Charles Southgate, Electrician, Claude-General Neon Lights Ltd.
- Sara Hilda Soutter, Temporary Postwoman Driver, Handsworth.
- Robert Spark, Chargeman Fitter, Middle Dock & Engineering Company, Ltd.
- Ethel May Spavin, Sorting Clerk and Telegraphist, Post Office Radio Station.
- Leonard Jesse Spencer, Senior Examiner, Aeronautical Inspection Department, Ministry of Aircraft Production.
- Leslie James Spikesley, Quarter-Master Sergeant, Ambulance Unit, Joint War Organisation of the British Red Cross Society and Order of St. John.
- Reginald Charles Spiller, lately Deputy Chief Warden, Civil Defence Wardens Service, Oxford.
- William Stanley Spours, Depot Storeholder, Ministry of Supply.
- Arthur Spreadbury, Laboratory Mechanic, HM Anti-Submarine Experimental Establishment.
- Sylvester Arthur Spruce, Electrical Overseer, Admiralty Outstation.
- Herbert Wilson Stagey, Observer, Royal Observer Corps.
- George Staddon, War Reserve, Devon County Constabulary. For services to Civil Defence.
- Frank George Stammers, Mate of a Steam Trawler.
- Edwin Standen, Temporary Postman, Guildford.
- Amelia Stanford, Chief Candler, Egg Packing Station, Suffolk Agricultural and Poultry Producers Association Ltd.
- Anne C. Stanley, Member, Women's Legion. For services to the War Office.
- John Gibson Steel, lately Chief Warden, Civil Defence Wardens Service, Sale.
- John Noble Stephen, DSM, Fisherman of a Motor Fishing Boat.
- Harry Vincent Evan Stephens, Chargeman of Electrical Fitters, HM Naval Base, Portland.
- Thomas Stephens, Foreman Boilermaker, Manchester Dry Docks Company Ltd.
- George Stevenson, Chief Steward, MV Rugeley (Stephens Sutton & Company).
- Charles Stewart, Foreman, Jute Industries Ltd.
- James Stewart, Donkeyman, SS Hebrides (McCallum Orme & Company Ltd.).
- John Arthur Stewart, lately Chief Warden, Civil Defence Wardens Service, Crosby.
- Lilian Myfawny Stileman, Head of Packing Room, Joint War Organisation of the British Red Cross Society and Order of St. John.
- Thomas Stirling, Head Foreman Plumber, Caledon Shipbuilding & Engineering Company Ltd.
- Edgar Alexander Stockwell, Carpenter, SS Basil (Booth Steamship Company Ltd.).
- Charles Henry Roy Stokes, lately Party Leader, Civil Defence Rescue Service, Chertsey.
- Patrick Dunstan Stokes, Civil Defence Officer, No. 1 Maintenance Unit, Royal Air Force.
- Frank Russell Stott, Head Foreman Blacksmith, Grangemouth Dockyard Company Ltd.
- Frederick Stowe, Greaser, MV Highland Monarch (Royal Mail Lines Ltd.).
- William Mann Strachan, Sergeant, Banff County Constabulary. For services to Civil Defence.
- David Strang, Donkeyman and Greaser, SS Cameronia (Anchor Line Ltd.).
- John Robert Strickland, Donkeyman, SS Fort Ticonderoga (Chellew Navigation Company Ltd.).
- Herbert Stroud, Second Steward, SS Andes (Royal Mail Lines Ltd.).
- John Samuel Stygall, Assistant Departmental Manager, George Kent Ltd.
- Edmund Suart, Cabinet Maker, Waring & Gillow Ltd.
- Gertrude Suckling, Temporary Engineering Assistant (F.), Grade I, Telephone Manager's Office, Southampton.
- Agnes Summersby, Press Operator, Telephone Manufacturing Company Ltd.
- Elias Sumnall, JP, Checkweighman, Wharncliffe Woodmoor Colliery.
- Cyril Sunderland, lately Staff Officer, Civil Defence Report and Control Centre, Halifax.
- John Sunley, Fitter's Mate, Royal Ordnance Factory, Aycliffe.
- Arthur Ernest Sutton, lately Head Warden, Civil Defence Wardens Service, Bridge Blean.
- Frederick John Swann, Mate-in-Charge, Waterguard Service, Board of Customs and Excise.
- Patrick Tallon, Able Seaman, MV Peebles (B. J. Sutherland & Company Ltd.).
- Mary Eleanor Tattersall, lately Canteen Worker, Young Women's Christian Association. For services to the Forces in Italy.
- Edward Taylor, Boatswain, SS Lancashire (Bibby Brothers & Company).
- Edwin Alfred Taylor, Acting Locomotive Foreman (Dover), Southern Railway Company.
- Frederick William Taylor, Foreman, No. 1 Central Workshop, War Office, Ashford.
- Joseph Taylor, Fireman and Trimmer, SS Samokla (Cayzer, Irvine & Company Ltd.).
- Cornelia Emmeline Thomas, Lecturer and Demonstrator, St. John's Ambulance Brigade, Cardiff.
- David John Thomas, Boatswain, MV Ancylus (Anglo-Saxon Petroleum Company Ltd.).
- David Lynn Thomas, Sergeant, Ambulance Unit, Joint War Organisation of the British Red Cross Society and Order of St. John.
- Ralph Henry Thomas, Donkeyman, SS Empire MacCallum (Hain Steamship Company Ltd.).
- Winifred Thomas, lately Junior Overlooker, Royal Ordnance Factory, Bridgend.
- Benjamin Swinhoe Thompson, Foreman Fitter, George Clark (1938) Ltd.
- Percy Harold Thompson, lately Staff Officer to District Warden, Civil Defence Wardens Service, North Lambeth.
- Robert John Thompson, Architectural and Civil Engineering Assistant, Air Ministry.
- Thomas Thompson, Roller, British Insulated Cables Ltd.
- Alexander Thomson, Able Seaman, SS Brora (William Sloan & Company).
- David Mason Thomson, Chief Observer, Royal Observer Corps.
- Dorothy Thomson, lately Warden, Civil Defence Wardens Service, Chichester.
- Arthur Thornton, Chief Observer, Royal Observer Corps.
- Frederick Thornton, Stoneman, Waterhouses Colliery, Pease & Partners, Limited.
- Hubert Thornton, Foreman Electrician, George F. Sleight, Jnr.
- William Frederick John Thurgood, Storeholder, Class "A", Ministry of Supply.
- George Henry Thursby, Temporary Manager, Northern Command, War Department Laundry.
- Henry George Arthur Tichener, Foreman, Osram Lamp Works, General Electric Company Ltd.
- Arthur Tidswell, Permanent Chargeman of Electrical Fitters, HM Dockyard, Devonport.
- Reginald Timpson, DCM, MM, lately Assistant to Chief Warden, Civil Defence Wardens Service, West Ham.
- Arthur Stanley Tite, Staff Foreman, Percival Aircraft Ltd.
- Norman Garfield Tomey, lately Senior Officer in Charge, Air Raid Precautions Control Centre, Birmingham.
- Philip Thomas Tomkins, Instructor, Osram Lamp Works, General Electric Company, Ltd.
- Henry Edward Tongs, Chief Steward, SS Runnelstone (Stone & Rolfe Ltd.).
- John Henry Toozer, War Reserve, Cardiff Police Force. For services to Civil Defence.
- George Henry Tottman, Established Wireless Operator, Royal Naval W/T. Station, Scarborough.
- Arthur Townson, Charge-hand, Hepworth & Grandage, Ltd.
- Edwin Trevaskis, Senior Draughtsman, Admiralty Signal Establishment.
- Wallace Samuel Trim, Able Seaman, SS Groningen (General Steam Navigation Company Ltd.).
- William James Trott, Night Telephonist, Post Office, Clacton-on-Sea.
- Anne Trueman, Wood Wool Rope Spinner, J. & W. Baldwin (Ashton) Ltd.
- William Truesdale, Shipwright and Loftsman, Barclay, Curie & Company Ltd.
- Francis Joseph Turley, Port Transport Worker, Hull.
- Mary Kathleen Turner, Head of Prisoner of War Packing Room, Joint War Organisation of the British Red Cross and Order of St. John.
- William Edmund Turner, Chief Observer, Royal Observer Corps.
- William Richard Turner, Second Office Keeper, India Office.
- Winifred Turner, Temporary Postwoman, Liverpool.
- Reginald Elliott Twelves, lately First Aid Commandant, Civil Defence Casualty Service, Chesterfield.
- Robert Twizell, Boatswain, SS Empire Chamois (Booth Steamship Company Ltd.).
- Joseph George Tyler, Driver, Joint War Organisation of the British Red Cross Society and Order of St. John.
- Dorothy Helen Tyrrie, Member, Women's Land Army, Yelverton, Devon.
- Frank Vacher, Foreman Boilermaker, E. Bacon & Company Ltd.
- Evelyn Vaux, Voluntary worker, Rest Centre Service, Hove.
- Antonio Vergera, Donkeyman and Greaser, SS Verand (Baltic Trading Company Ltd.).
- Eric Richard Vickers, Foreman Inspector, Come Valley Water Company. For services to Civil Defence.
- Thomas Vokins, Skilled Fitter, Morris Commercial Cars Ltd.
- George Frederick Wadsworth, Fitter, Vulcan Foundry Ltd.
- Harry Wager, Chargeman of Shipwrights, HM Dockyard, Sheerness.
- Robert Edward Waith, Boatswain, SS Geddington Court (Court Line Ltd.).
- Robert Leslie Wakefield, Mechanic and Fitter, Research Station, Petroleum Warfare Department.
- Rita Walford, Regional Clothing Officer, Women's Voluntary Services.
- Joseph Kenneth Walker, lately Reports Officer, Civil Defence Control Centre, Birmingham.
- Richard Edward Walker, Fitter, Robert Jenkins & Company Ltd.
- William Thomas Walker, Foreman, Tan Sad Ltd.
- Victor George Walklin, Skilled Labourer and Permanent Chargeman, HM Dockyard, Devonport.
- Marjorie Gertrude Wall, lately Ambulance Driver, Civil Defence Casualty Service, Clacton.
- William Morgan Wallace, Senior Company Officer, Western No. 1 Area of Scotland, National Fire Service.
- Ernest James Waller, Chargeman of Skilled Labourers, HM Dockyard, Chatham.
- Violet Wallis, Deputy Centre Organiser, Hackney, Women's Voluntary Services.
- William Duncan Walter, Staff Inspector, Metropolitan Special Constabulary.
- Thomas Joseph Walters, Principal Storekeeper, Ministry of Works.
- Thomas Wanless, Senior Draughtsman, Admiralty.
- Cecil Ward, Organiser, Housewives Service, Bristol, Women's Voluntary Services.
- Leslie Russell Ward, Engineer, Truvox Engineering Company Ltd.
- David Wardlaw, Chief Plumber, Singer Manufacturing Company, Ltd.
- David I'Anson Warren, Chief Foreman (Laira Locomotive Depot), Great Western Railway Company.
- James Philip Warren, Machine Shop Chargehand, Sperry Gyroscope Company.
- Mary Frances Warren, Centre Organiser, Rye, Women's Voluntary Services.
- Frederick Joseph Waters, Skilled Workman, Class I, Portsmouth Telephone Area.
- William John Watkins, lately Divisional Warden, Civil Defence Wardens Service, Northampton.
- Alexander Watson, Boatswain, SS Thrift (Northern Co-operative Service Ltd.).
- Arthur Godfrey Watson, MC, MM, lately Staff Officer, Civil Defence Light Rescue Service.
- James Watson, Chargeman of Coopers, HM Dockyard, Rosyth.
- John Henry Watson, Chief Inspector, Guildford Garage, London Passenger Transport Board.
- John Thomas Watson, Head Foreman Electrician, Swan Hunter & Wigham Richardson Ltd.
- Joseph Waiters, Foreman of Trades, Air Ministry Outstation.
- Frederick Watts, Chargehand Fitter, Aircraft Torpedo Development Unit, Ministry of Aircraft Production.
- Norman Gordon Watson Watts, Assistant I, Aircraft Torpedo Development Unit, Ministry of Aircraft Production.
- Andrew Waugh, Shop Foreman, No. 9 Maintenance Unit, Royal Air Force.
- John Waugh, Miner, Dudley Colliery.
- Thomas Weaver, lately Operational Officer, Civil Defence Rescue Service, Hastings.
- Florence Webb, Capstan and Lathe Operator, Butlers Ltd.
- Frederick Weber, Donkeyman and Greaser, MV Neritina (Anglo-Saxon Petroleum Company Ltd.).
- George Richard Oswell Weekes, Inspector, London Passenger Transport Board.
- George Albert Wells, Chief Electrician, Hobourn Aero Components Ltd.
- Charles Thomas Weight, Foreman of Trades, No. 6 Maintenance Unit, Royal Air Force.
- Neil Weir, Fireman, SS Arran (Clyde & Campbeltown Shipping Company Ltd.).
- William James Weir, District Operator, Broadstairs, Petroleum Board.
- Albert Andrew West, Principal Foreman of Stores, Air Ministry Outstation.
- Cyril Lancelot Westgate, Chief Observer, Royal Observer Corps.
- Harry Morris Westgate, lately Staff Officer, Civil Defence Casualty Services, Battersea.
- David Weston, Head Stock-keeper, Joint War Organisation of the British Red Cross Society and Order of St. John.
- Reginald Wheelhouse, Chief Observer, Royal Observer Corps.
- Charles Whellams, lately Squad Leader, Civil Defence Rescue Service, Walthamstow.
- William George Wheller, Electrical Overseer, Admiralty Outstation.
- Bertie Walsham Whitaker, lately Group Head Warden, Civil Defence Wardens Service, Exeter.
- Charles Cyril White, Mechanical Foreman, Sunderland River Weir Commission.
- Joseph White, Coppersmith (Wellingborough), London, Midland and Scottish Railway Company.
- George Whiteman, Assistant Foreman Coppersmith, Vickers-Armstrongs Ltd.
- John Whittington, Chief Steward, SS Lairdsglen (Burma & Laird Lines Ltd.).
- Amelia Jane Whittle, Forewoman, Brown & Bibby Ltd.
- Alcock Gordon Wicks, General Foreman, Surveyor's Department, Caterham and Warlingham Urban District. For services to Civil Defence.
- Vera Winnie Wicks, Leading Press-Hand, Huntley Boorne & Stevens Ltd.
- George Frederick Wiggington, Storeholder, Respirator Depot, Ministry of Supply.
- George Robert Wilbourne, Chief Engineer of a Steam Trawler.
- Mary Elizabeth Wild, French Polisher, Post Office Factory, Birmingham.
- Elisabeth Anetta Wilkinson, Works Forewoman, Copeland & Jenkins Ltd.
- Frederick Jack Wilkinson, Machine Shop Foreman, L.M.K. Manufacturing Company Ltd.
- George Bertram Wilkinson, Greaser, MV Athlone Castle (Union Castle Mail Steamship Company Ltd.).
- Aubrey Baylis Wilks, lately Chief Warden, Civil Defence Wardens Service, Bury St. Edmunds.
- Benjamin Williams, Able Seaman, MV Mersey Coast (Coast Lines Ltd.).
- Frederick Williams, Gauge Maker and Guri Actioner, James Purdey & Sons Ltd.
- Harold Williams, Machine Shop Foreman, Allen West & Company Ltd.
- Henry Williams, lately Machine Setter, Royal Small Arms Factory, Enfield Lock.
- Hugh Isaac Williams, JP, Repairer, Deep Navigation Colliery.
- Robert Williams, Store Keeper and Foreman, Joint War Organisation of the British Red Cross Society and Order of St. John.
- Minnie Elizabeth Wilsdon, Temporary Sorting Clerk and Telegraphist, Nottingham.
- Cyril Stuart Wilsher, Foreman, E. Shipton & Company Ltd.
- Arthur Hood Wilson, Assistant Inspecting Officer, Hong Siang, Admiralty.
- Edwin Wilson, Senior Foreman, Peter Brotherhood.
- George Wilson, Skipper of a Motor Fishing Boat.
- George Humphries Wilson, British Legion Office, Central Station, Glasgow. For services to the Forces.
- Stanley Herbert Wilton, employed in the Receiving Department, Joint War Organisation of the British Red Cross Society and Order of St. John.
- Eric Stanley Windass, Skilled Workman, Class II, York Telephone Area.
- Edward Winn, Chief Observer, Royal Observer Corps.
- Oliver Frederick Henry Wintle, Board Machine Man, St. Anne's Board Mill Company Ltd.
- Arthur Thomas Wisson, Shop Foreman, No. 6 Maintenance Unit, Royal Air Force.
- Ernest Henry Witts, Foreman, Wallis & Tiernan Ltd.
- Mary Douglas Wood. For services to Civil Deienee in Hemel Hempstead.
- Phyllis Wood, Chargehand, Mullard Radio Valve Company.
- Stephen Woodhouse, Second Fisherman of a Steam Trawler.
- Ernest Victor Woodroffe, Senior Hydrographic Draughtsman, Admiralty.
- Eizabeth Louisa Woods, Assistant Group Officer, No. 30 (E. Kent) Area, National Fire Service.
- Francis Woods, Cook, SS Kalliope (G. Heyn & Sons Ltd.).
- Victor James Wootten, lately Post Warden, Civil Defence Wardens Service, City of Westminster.
- Richard Worth, Skipper of an Inshore Fishing Boat.
- Harry Dixon Wotton, Head Stock-keeper, Joint War Organisation of the British Red Cross Society and Order of St. John.
- Francis Arthur Wright, Fitter Erector, Vickers-Armstrongs Ltd., Supermarine Works.
- George Wright, employed in Department of War Office.
- Harold Wrigley, Leading Foreman, Samuel Gratrix Ltd.
- Elizabeth Catherine Wyllie, Member, Scottish Women's Land Army, Angus.
- John Young, Marine Fitter, John G. Kincaid & Company Ltd.
- Thomas Daw Young, Special Examiner (Temporary), Ministry of Supply.
- Walter William George Young, Coastguardsman, HM Coastguard Service.
- Percy William Youngs, Works Foreman, Lightfoot Refrigeration Company Ltd.

=== Dominions ===
- Florence Adelaide Mack. For services to the Forces in South Australia.
- Mary Showell. For services to the Forces in South Australia.
- Annie May Whittle. For services to the Forces in South Australia.
- Headman Maama Lechesa, attached to the African Pioneer Corps Welfare Office, Maseru, Basutoland.
- Adele Monyake, Acting Matron, Quthing Hospital, Basutoland.
- David Nyathe, Senior Dispenser, Medical Department, Maseru, Basutoland.

=== India ===
- Mirza Mian Ahmad, Head Clerk, Kurram Militia, North West Frontier Province.
- Babulal Aleh, Inspector of Police and Assistant A.R.P. Officer, Dimapur, Assam.
- Murul Allam, Foreman, Engineering, Shalimar Works, Calcutta.
- Hugh Barkley John Baptist, Principal Foreman, Harness and Saddlery Factory, Cawnpore.
- Arthur Wellington Barlow, Guard, Rawalpindi Division, North-Western Railway.
- Jeanne Maud Brown, In-Charge, Stenographers and Typing Staff, Quartermaster-General's Branch, India.
- Karuna Kanta Chakrabarty, Foreman, Rifle Factory, Isliapore.
- Madan Krishna Chitre, Range Forest Officer, West Khandesh Division, Bombay.
- Alfred Daniels, Mechanical Supervisor, Calcutta Improvement Trust, Bengal.
- Maxmillian DeSouza, Superintendent, Government of India Labour Supply Depot, Jharsuguda.
- Kathleen Gateley, lately Personal Assistant to the Quarter-mas(ter-General in India.
- Babu Dhirendra Narayan Guha, Range Officer, Cox's Bazar, Chittagong, Bengal.
- Henry Oswald Gwyther, Foreman, Erecting Shop, Bengal and Assam Railway, Saidpur.
- Denis William Haydn, Officiating Assistant Bridge Engineer, East India Railway, Kashi.
- John Walter Hodge, Head Assistant, Confidential Branch, Assam Secretariat.
- Jaya Kamlia, Syrang (T. No. 8004), Commander of the Yards Department, H.M.I. Dockyard, Bombay.
- Abdul Rahman Khan, Jailor, District Jail, Fatehgarh, United Provinces.
- Mohammed Afzal Khan, Foreman, Press of the Private Secretary to His Excellency the Viceroy.
- Wazir Khan, Recruiter, Recruiting Staff, Calcutta.
- Beecha Lal, Supervisor, Inspectorate of Military Carriages, Jubbulpore.
- William Lithgow, Principal Foreman, Gun and Shell Factory, Cossipore.
- Keshav Napayan Madhekar, Mamlatdar, Sangola Taluka, Sholapur District, Bombay.
- Sri Ramayya Naidu Adisesha Naidu, Progress Assistant, Supply Department, Government of India.
- Tewari Nitya Nand, Upper Division Clerk, I.A.C.C., H.Q., Central Command.
- Babu Gopendra Mohan Nath, Forester, Assam Forest Department, Silchar, Assam.
- Frank North, Bandmaster, Central Provinces Police Band, Nagpur.
- Felice Hazel Pereira, Personal Assistant to the Adjutant-General in India.
- Ardeshir Pestonji Rana, Assistant Engineer, Scindia Steam Navigation Company Ltd., Vizagapatam.
- Babu Suresh Chandra Roy, Forest Ranger, Chittagong, Bengal.
- Kwell Mohan Roy, Assistant Commandant, Assam Civil Porter Corps, Shillong, Assam.
- Thameem Abdul Shakoor, Principal Foreman, Clothing Factory, Madras.
- Chaudri Bharat Singh, Tahsildar, Faridpur Tahsil, Bareilly, United Provinces.
- Puran Singh, Zamindar, Village Pharwahi, Patiala State.
- Thakur Narbadeshwar Singh, Labour Officer, Gorakhpur, United Provinces.
- Sri Kadiyala Sriramamurty, Head Clerk, Collector's Office, Koraput, and lately Supervisor of Supplies, Orissa.
- Charles Todman, Construction Engineer, Telegraph Workshops, Jubbulpore.
- Arthur Anthony Weston, Driver, Delhi Division, North-Western Railway.
- Percy Charles Younger, Sergeant-Major, Armed Reserve Police, Chitoor District, Madras.

=== Colonies, Protectorates, Etc. ===
- Lilian Ethel Davis, Grade "A" Clerk, Registrar Office, British Guiana.
- Russell Seton Olton. For services to Civil Defence in British Guiana.
- Ismail Ali, Employed on the staff of the Military Governor, British Somaliland.
- Ahmed Nalayeh, Somali Assistant, British Somaliland.
- Peter Reginald De Silva, Class I Clerk, Defence Branch, Chief Secretary's Office, Ceylon.
- Don Edoris Wickramasinghe, Civilian Clerk, Ordnance Department, Ceylon.
- Hassan Shevket Effendi, lately Temporary Employee, Treasury, Cyprus.
- Haralambous Gavriel Michaelides, Forest Ranger, Cyprus.
- Arthur Leslie Hardy. For welfare services in the Falkland Islands.
- William John Lewis, Lighthouse Keeper, Cape Pembroke, Falkland Islands.
- Peni R. Sokia, Officer in Charge, Special Provincial Constables, Suva, Fiji Islands.
- Landing Bojang, Seyfu of Kombo, Central District, South Bank Division, Gambia.
- Lennie Ingram Peters. For services to Civil Defence in Gambia.
- Frederick Crewe, Engine Driver, Port Department, Gibraltar.
- Oscar Ferrando, Hall Porter, The Convent, Gibraltar.
- James Duncan Mitchell, Inspector of Works, Grade I, Public Works Department, Gold Coast.
- Ahamed Farah, Employed in the District Commissioner's Office, Northern Frontier, District, Kenya.
- Karolous Ocholla Okusmu, Hospital Assistant, Medical Department, Kenya.
- Zedekiah Oyando, Senior Agricultural Instructor, Agricultural Department, Kenya.
- Alfred Everett Penn, Employed in the office of the Commissioner, Virgin Islands, Leeward Islands.
- Christian Scott Roy. For welfare services in the Leeward Islands.
- Joseph Bigeni, Telephone Operator, Valletta Exchange, Malta.
- Maria Dolores Gatt, Nursing Sister, St. Batholomew's (Leprosy) Hospital, Malta.
- Paul Magri, Fitter, Water Works Department, Malta.
- Emanual Pace, Postal Clerk, First Class, Malta.
- John Portelli, Telephone Operator, Valletta Emergency Exchange, Malta.
- Francis Scicluna, Foreman, Public Works Department, Malta.
- Emanuel Zammit, Assistant Engineer, Telephone Branch, Post Office, Malta.
- Hilda Gilbert, Chief Supervisor, Women's Section, Detainment Camp, Mauritius.
- Francis John Bewsey, First British Sergeant, Palestine Police Force.
- Mark Dunlevy, Assistant to the Assistant A.R.P. Liaison Officer, Nablus, Palestine.
- Fanny King, Clerk, Grade N, Palestine.
- Ethel Ley, Senior Examiner, Jerusalem Postal and Telegraph Censorship, Palestine.
- Haj Rashid Murrar, Mukhtar of Saint and President.of the Village Council, Palestine.
- William Reilly, Senior Foreman (Foundry), Palestine.
- Yanni Costandi Yanni, President of the Local Council of Kafr Yasif, Palestine.
- Grace Sim, Senior Member, Local Nursing Staff, St. Helena.
- Lockwood Bruce Young. For services in the production of food crops in St. Helena.
- Edgar Ernest Heath, Railway Locomotive Foreman, Sierra Leone.
- Israel Onesimus Williams, Junior Technical Staff Grade I, Public Works Department, Sierra Leone.
- Samuel Beresford Hedd-Williams, Second Class Station Master, Freetown, Sierra Leone.
- Thomas Menzies. Wood, Manager, Royal Naval Club, Port of Spain, Trinidad.
- Abuneri Okulo, First Grade Head Warder, Prisons Service, Uganda.
- Mautake. For services to the Government in the Western Pacific.
- Willie Paia, Interpreter, Munda, Western Pacific.
