= William A. C. Shearer =

English Headteacher (1897 – 1910)

William Shearer B.A
- Born: 30 April 1863; Saint Mary, Edge Hill, Lancashire, England
- Died: 4 November 1910 (aged 47); Essex, England
- Education: Exeter College, Oxford (B.A, First Class Honours)
- Occupations: Educator, Headmaster
- Spouse: Eleanore Catherine Winslow

William Alexander Campbell Shearer (30 April 1863 – 4 November 1910) was a British educator who served as the Headmaster of Latymer's Charity School in Edmonton from 1897 until his dismissal in 1909. An Oxford-educated scholar, his tenure was characterized by his efforts to modernise the school amidst significant challenges, including dilapidated facilities, internal political opposition, and prolonged administrative delays. His career concluded with the school's temporary closure and his death shortly thereafter.

== Early life and education ==
William Alexander Campbell Shearer was born on 30 April 1863 in Saint Mary, Edge Hill, Lancashire. He was the son of Jane Shearer and the Reverend William Campbell Shearer, a professor of philology. He had a brother, Donald F. Shearer.

He was educated at Bradford Grammar School. In 1881, he won a Double Classical Scholarship to the University of Oxford. On 21 June that year, he was awarded the prestigious Akroyd Scholarship, described at the time as the "blue-ribbon of the Yorkshire Public Schools," which was valued at £75 a year for three years. He matriculated at the Exeter College, Oxford where he read Classics and graduated with First Class Honours in Literae Humaniores.

== Career ==
=== Merchant Taylors' Boys' School ===
After graduating from Oxford, Shearer took up a post as a teacher at the Merchant Taylors' School in Crosby, Liverpool, where he gained what was described as "successful teaching experience."

During his time at the school, Shearer was actively involved in its extracurricular life. The school's magazine, the Merchant Taylors' Review, records his participation in various school activities alongside the students and other masters. In the summer of 1892, he competed in the school's lawn tennis tournament, defeating a fellow master, Mr. Bowman, in a competitive three-set match before having to withdraw from a later round. The following April, the magazine noted that he had participated in a Chess Club evening, playing games against the boys.

He also took part in the doubles tennis tournament of 1893 alongside his colleague, Mr. Reeves. In March 1894, he was one of the masters who attended the Old Boys' Association "Smoking Concert," a social event for past and present members of the school community. His involvement in sport continued, with the November 1894 edition mentioning his "plucky struggles" in the Old Boys' Tennis Tournament that year.

The November 1897 edition of the Merchant Taylors' Review announced his departure from the school, stating, "MR. W. A. SHEARER has been appointed Head Master of Edmonton Grammar School, near London".

=== Headmaster of Latymer's Charity School (1897–1910) ===
Latymer's School as it appeared between 1874 and 1910

In September 1897, at the age of 34, Shearer was appointed Headmaster of Latymer's Charity School in Edmonton. Shearer inherited a school already in decline. His predecessor, Rev. Dr. Dolbé, retired in 1897, leaving behind a 'crumbling building' with a 'narrow curriculum,' which the Middlesex County Council refused to recognize. This period was described as one of 'rudderless drift and decline,' suggesting Shearer took on a deeply troubled institution.

At his first speech day address on 17 December 1897, he outlined his vision for the school. He stated his intention to prepare boys for commercial life, while retaining Latin as a "medium of education" and giving French, German, and scientific subjects a "prominent position." His stated goal was to provide "an education as would enable every boy to be on absolutely equal terms with boys from any other school in England." The school's trustees initially promised him new buildings, new playing fields, and their "unswerving support."

Shearer's tenure was defined by a series of persistent challenges. An 1899 report by Assistant Commissioner Mitcheson found the school's facilities to be wholly inadequate, describing the three classrooms and yard as "about the worst I have ever seen," with no assembly room or rooms for special subjects. The school was divided into an Upper School of 58 middle-class boys paying a tuition fee of £2 10s. per term, and a Lower School of 195 boys paying 4d. or 6d. a week, which the Upper School pupils regarded as a "spurious institution." The curriculum was deemed "second grade," with no science, limited mathematics, and no Greek taught. By 1907, a further inspection by the Board of Education found the premises to be "tumble-down, squalid, and probably unhealthy," with disused and decaying lavatories and outhouses.

Class of 1906, Shearer in the centre

In 1898, Shearer and the trustees formulated plans for a new Upper School to be built on a 6.75-acre site on what would later become Haselbury Road. The project, estimated to cost over £5,000, was met with fierce local opposition. The new vicar, Rev. Robert Stewart Gregory, who had become a trustee, sought to divert Latymer's endowment funds to his own Church of England schools.

From 1899 to 1900, a major political and religious conflict erupted in Edmonton. Gregory, supported by factions favouring the elementary-level Lower School, opposed the development of a secondary school. At a public meeting on 25 May 1900, Gregory's proposals to maintain the school as a primary institution were carried by a vote of 700 to 19. On 7 December 1899, Gregory had used his casting vote at a trustees' meeting to veto an application to the Charity Commissioners for a new scheme of government.

Following the controversy, the period from 1901 to 1908 was one of administrative stalemate. A new scheme sealed in 1901 authorised two new schools (the Latymer Secondary School and the Latymer Elementary School) but plans for their construction stalled. The Board of Education refused to grant the school any kind of recognition as a secondary school, and further delays were attributed to a broader governmental policy review regarding the "municipalising" of endowed schools. The number of pupils in the Upper School dwindled; having started at 58 in 1899, the roll had fallen to 47 by 1905 and stood at only 56 by the time of a major inspection in December 1907. That inspection found the school still in a state of decay, with an inadequate curriculum and underpaid staff.

In his own annual report to the governors, Shearer wrote:

There are at present 52 names on the books as compared with 46 in the first term of my headmastership. Bearing in mind that not one of the improvements suggested by me in 1898 as essential to the well-being of a secondary school has as yet been carried out, you will, I hope, regard the increase in numbers as satisfactory.

In 1909, a new governing body, dominated by the Middlesex County Council, was established to oversee Latymer's School. On 24 June 1909, Shearer wrote to the Secretary of the Middlesex Education Committee, stating his willingness to 'accept office of Head Master under the new body of governors.' However, the governors' stance shifted within weeks. At a meeting on 26 July 1909, Colonel Henry Ferryman Bowles, acting as the spokesman for the County Council, proposed the motion to close the school at Christmas and terminate Shearer's appointment.

Shearer submitted a printed letter, titled "PRIVATE & CONFIDENTIAL," to protest the decision. In it, he wrote:

I appeal to the Trustees as a body of honourable men... I demand as my right to know upon what grounds they have taken such drastic steps without hearing any defence I may make... In common justice which is an Englishman's privilege, I have a right to be heard before a decision which necessarily drives me into poverty is made final.

His appeal was unsuccessful. While the new Vicar / Chairman (Rev. Ernest A. B. Sanders) spoke in Shearer's defence, Bowles argued that it was 'impossible to continue the headmaster when there were practically neither buildings nor pupils,' citing the school's £442 bank overdraft and significant unpaid debts to local tradesmen. The school officially closed, and in June 1910, a letter addressed to "The Headmaster, Latymer's School" was returned by the postman with the endorsement "SCHOOL ABOLISHED." Someone had also chalked the word "ICHABOD" on the wall of the derelict building.

Following his dismissal, and the reopening of The Latymer School under Richard Ashworth, a tribute titled "An Appreciation" appeared in the weekly herald, written to defend Shearer from "calumnies which are going the rounds." The author, signing as "L'AUDACE," praised Shearer's legacy at the Latymer School, highlighting his philosophy that the goal of education was to raise "Christian men." The letter affectionately referred to him as "our beloved 'Sandy'" and lamented the loss of "the old familiar face of one who is gone."

== Personal life ==
Shearer married Eleanore Catherine Winslow, the daughter of the Reverend Charles De Blois Winslow, vicar of Blundellsands, Merseyside. The wedding, which was a choral service, took place at St. Michael's Church, Blundellsands. The church was decorated for the occasion with flowers and plants. The bride wore a gown of ivory satin trimmed with chiffon and Limerick lace and carried a bouquet of white roses, carnations, and lilies. She was attended by her sisters, Miss Winslow and Miss May Winslow, who served as bridesmaids. Shearer's brother, Donald F. Shearer, was the best man. The service was conducted by the Rev. T. H. Evans, assisted by the bride's father.

Late in his tenure at Latymer, Shearer was described as a "slight man of medium build, with sandy moustache and hair going thin." Contemporary recollections and official reports suggest that his personal well-being had begun to deteriorate in these later years. A 1907 inspection noted that he had "comforted himself in a very unwise way," referring to a growing dependence on alcohol, though the precise impact on his health was unclear. The formal summary went further, describing him as "a headmaster increasingly seeking the solace of drink."

Former pupils also recalled signs of personal decline. One student described him as "smok[ing] cigarettes like a chimney," with a moustache that was "permanently gingered," and remarked critically that Shearer "did not do much towards teaching — in fact, I can't remember anything that he did do."

Following his dismissal, he and his wife moved to Epping.

== Death and burial ==
On Thursday, 3 November 1910, Shearer suffered a fatal bicycle accident near Stonard's Hill, Epping, where he sustained a fracture at the base of his skull. He succumbed to his injuries on Friday, 4 November 1910, and died in Essex.

An inquest held on Friday afternoon, 4 November 1910, determined the injuries were accidentally received, possibly due to a sudden brake application on loose stones, with a bent brake and broken mudguard noted. He was buried on 7 November 1910 at All Saints Church in Epping Upland.

== Bibliography ==
- Morris, Joseph Acton (1975). A History of The Latymer School at Edmonton. The Latymer Foundation at Edmonton. ISBN 978-0-9504862-0-8.
- Granath, Andrew (1995). Latymer Remembered Memories Of Latymer School 1882 - 1945. ISBN 0950541524.
