= Arthur Sanders =

Arthur Sanders may refer to:

- Arthur Sanders (British Army officer) (1877–1918), British Army officer
- Arthur Sanders (RAF officer) (1898–1974), Royal Air Force air marshal
- Arthur Sanders (cricketer) (1900–1920), English cricketer
- Arthur Sanders (footballer) (1901–1983), English footballer and teacher

== See also ==
- Arthur Sandes (1793–1832), Irishman who fought in the Venezuelan war of Independence
