= Charles Dolbé =

English Headteacher and Clergyman

The Reverend Doctor Charles Vincent Dolbé B.A, M.A, LL.B, LL.D
- Born: 7 October 1835; Mayfair, London, England
- Died: 8 April 1902 (aged 66); Palmers Green, London, England
- Education: Clare College, Cambridge (B.A, M.A); Trinity College, Dublin (B.A ad eundem, LL.B, LL.D)
- Occupations: Cleric; Headmaster
- Spouse: Agnes Anne Bingham (m.1868)

Ecclesiastical career
- Religion: Christian (Anglican)
- Church: Church of England
- Ordained: 1866 (Deacon); 1867 (Priest)
- Offices held: Headmaster of The Latymer School (1867–1897); Chaplain of Strand Industrial School (1875–1902); Curate of St Thomas's, Charterhouse (1876–1887); Chairman of Edmonton School Board

Charles Vincent Dolbé B.A, M.A, LL.B, LL.D (7 October 1835 – 8 April 1902) was an English headmaster and Anglican cleric, best known for his transformative thirty-year tenure as Headmaster of Latymer's Charity School in Edmonton. He played a significant role in developing the school into a prominent middle-class institution and was actively involved in local educational and community affairs.

== Early life and education ==
Charles Vincent Dolbé was born on 7 October 1835 in Dorchester House, Mayfair, and baptised on 27 December 1835 at St George's, Hanover Square. He was the son of Charles Henry Dolbé, a butler at the residence, and Charlotte Dolbé (née King). His mother, Charlotte, died in 1839 when he was 4 years old. By 1841, Charles was living in St Mary, Newington, Surrey, with his younger siblings, father Charles, and stepmother Mary.

He matriculated at Clare College, Cambridge on 15 October 1863, which was unusually old for entry at the time. He graduated with a Bachelor of Arts degree in 1867 and a Master of Arts in 1871. Prior to his Cambridge studies, he had already served as headmaster of a school in the City of London, St Anne's, Aldersgate. During this period, Charles married Agnes Bingham on 8 February 1868 at Saint John the Evangelist, the couple never had children.

In 1870, he obtained a Bachelor of Arts ad eundem gradum and a Bachelor of Laws from Trinity College, Dublin. On 22 December 1877, the University of Dublin awarded him a Doctor of Laws degree.

== Career ==
=== Early career and ordination ===
On 23 December 1866, Dolbé was ordained as a deacon in the Church of England by the Right Rev. Dr. David Anderson, a year later on 22 December 1867, he was then ordained as a priest by The Most Rev. Archibald Tait, the Bishop of London. He served as curate of St Thomas's, Charterhouse, from 1876 to 1887. He was also appointed chaplain of the Strand Industrial School in 1875.

=== Headmaster of Latymer's Charity School (1867–1897) ===
On 27 September 1867, at the age of 32, Dolbé was appointed headmaster of Latymer's Charity School in Edmonton. He took charge of what was then a struggling institution and embarked on a period of significant reform and expansion. His appointment demonstrated the trustees' determination to create a middle-class school in Edmonton.

Under his leadership, Latymer saw a considerable increase in student numbers and academic standards. The school buildings were extended; in 1868, at a cost of £1,000, the old north wall of the Wyatt room was removed and an extension added. Two further rooms were added at the east end for the Upper School boys. By the end of his first year, student numbers reached 159 (Lower 139; Upper 20). By Christmas 1873, the total was over 200 (Lower 150; Upper 60). Further additions in 1874 brought the school's capacity to 270 boys with a staff of six. He resided at the Latymer School House in Church Street, Edmonton, during his tenure.

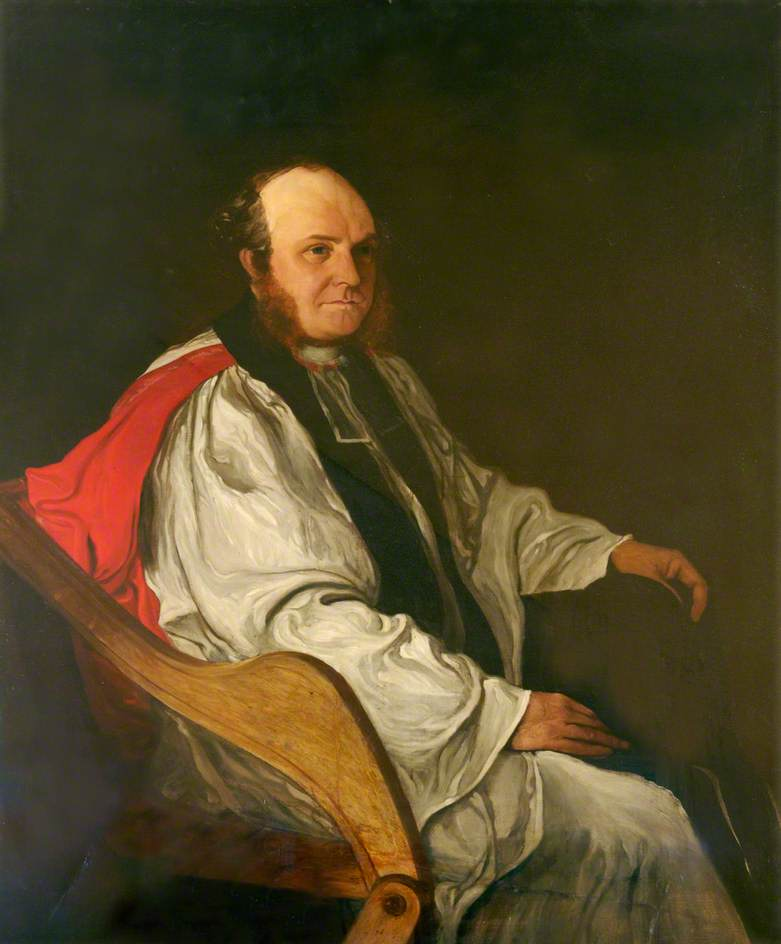
Painting of Dolbé commissioned by the Edmonton Library Committee c.1892

Dolbé introduced a broad curriculum that included Latin, French, History, Geography, Grammar, Writing, Arithmetic, Euclid, Drawing, and Scripture. The school achieved success in external examinations, including those of the Science and Art Department. He established the school motto Palmam qui meruit ferat (Let him who has earned the palm bear it) and the awarding of a gold medal to the top boy in each school, carrying the Latymer crest and the date 1624.

He took a keen interest in athletics and cricket, continuing as vice-president of Edmonton Cricket Club. The school's football teams became competitive under his patronage.

Dolbé faced challenges, including initial religious disputes with local Nonconformists, which he handled with a spirited defence of his position, asserting that it was "possible to be a minister of Christ without being a worse man, a worse citizen, or a worse schoolmaster." He was also involved in a notable lawsuit concerning the land for the Second Master's house, known as the Laurel Villas case, which the Latymer Trustees lost, incurring significant costs.

His school prospectus of 1889 showed a staff of seven full-time and one part-time master. He himself taught the top class. The Upper School curriculum included Euclid, algebra, French, German, and Latin, with an emphasis on preparation for Oxford Local and Civil Service entrance examinations. By 1890, the Upper School had 73 boys and the Lower School 190.

=== Chaplaincy and community roles ===
Alongside his headmastership, Dolbé held several chaplaincy positions. From 1875, he was Chaplain to the Strand Union Schools, a role he held until his death, and was highly regarded, actively participating in school events. From 1876 to 1887, he also served as Chaplain (Curate) to St Thomas's, Charterhouse, in Finsbury.

Dolbé was a prominent figure in adult education in Edmonton. He chaired the organising committee for the Gilchrist Extension Lectures held at Edmonton Town Hall, often reminding audiences of the contributions of the Adams family to local astronomy. He was also involved with the Edmonton School Board from its inception in 1880, serving as its chairman.

== Philosophy of Education ==
Dr. Dolbé's philosophy of education emphasized hard work, character development, and the pursuit of worthy objectives. He believed that ability and effort were the keys to success and that earning an achievement was far more valuable than simply receiving it. To illustrate the importance of focus, Dolbé used a metaphor based on Euclid's definition of a straight line. He urged students to define a "worthy object" as their goal and then to align all their actions and efforts directly toward it, resisting distractions from the "littleness of life."

== Later life, retirement and death ==
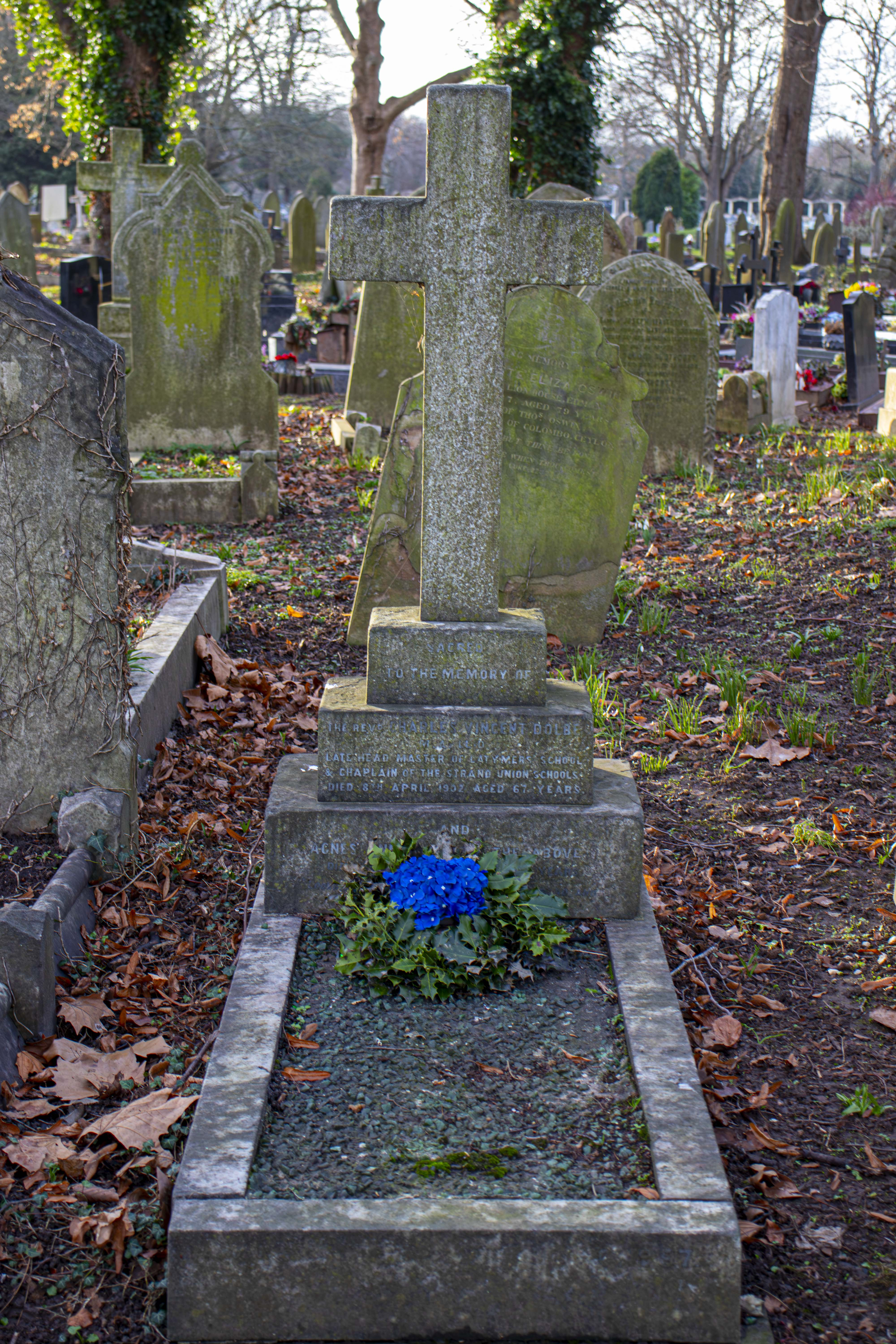
Grave of Charles Dolbé, Edmonton Cemetery

Dolbé retired as Headmaster of Latymer School in 1897, at the age of 61. The Charity Commissioners sanctioned a pension of £120 per annum. He had felt the strain of his long public service and the increasing demands of the school.

He lived in retirement with his wife at their home in Palmers Green, until his death there on Tuesday, 8 April 1902, aged 65.

His funeral was held on the following Saturday. The funeral cortège was routed past the Strand Union Schools on Silver Street, where the resident children were drawn up outside. Following a service at the All Saint's Church, he was buried in Edmonton Cemetery. Subsequently, the Edmonton School Board, where Dolbé had been an early member and chairman, passed a vote of condolence. At the meeting, he was described by his colleagues as having a "consistant, careful, and persistent manner" and showing the "strictest integrity."

== Legacy ==
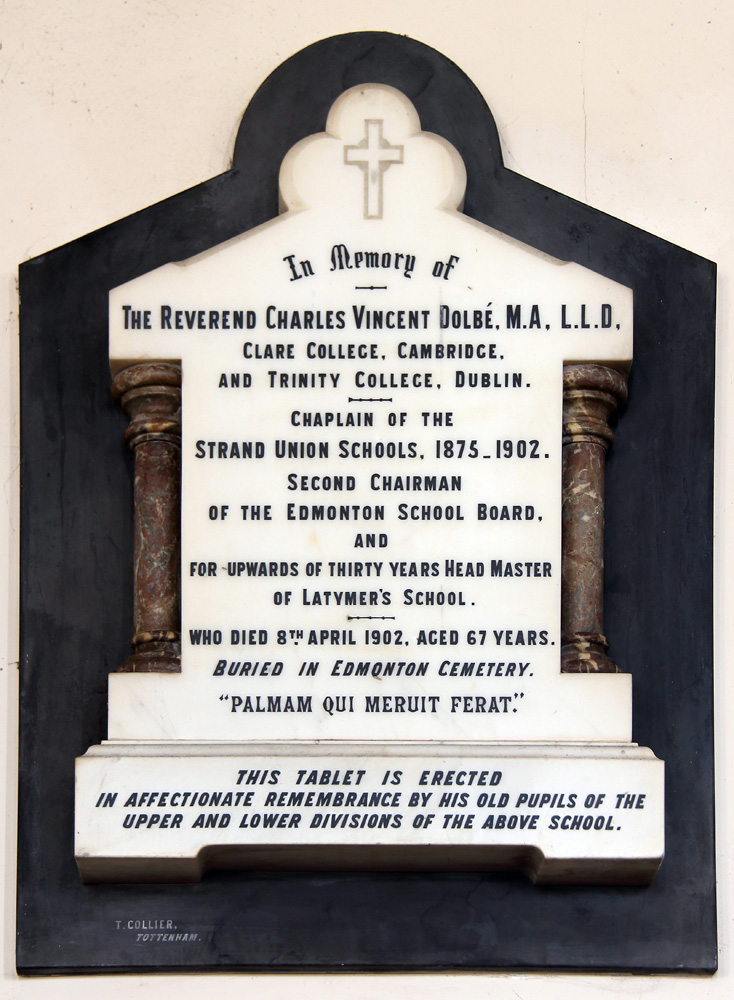
Memorial tablet of Charles Dolbé, All Saints' Church, Edmonton

Upon his death in 1902, Dolbé's influence was noted in 'An Appreciation' in the Tottenham and Edmonton Weekly Herald, written by a former student. The tribute described him as more than a schoolmaster, but a "true friend who had won their affection not less than their respect." The author credited Dolbé's community work, including his role on early school boards and his support of sports, and praised his teaching methods. He was remembered for having a "keen sense of humour" while maintaining discipline, and for his emphasis on languages and mathematics, which was credited for the success of Latymer pupils in Civil Service and Oxford Local examinations.

Following his death, a memorial was organized and funded by former pupils of the school. The initiative was led by the "Latymer Old Boys," who held a meeting at the Latymer School on Thursday, 13 November 1902 to formalize the proposal. While some attendees suggested the memorial be placed in the school itself, the group unanimously decided on a marble tablet to be erected in All Saints' Church. The tablet was fixed to the western wall of the church and unveiled during a special service on Saturday, 16 May 1903 at 7:00pm. In front of a "fairly large attendance of Old Boys and others," the tablet was unveiled by Mr. J. R. Anning, a prominent local figure. The inscription commemorates Dolbé's thirty-year tenure as Headmaster, his role as Chaplain of the Strand Union Schools from 1875 to 1902, and his position as the second Chairman of the Edmonton School Board. It concludes with the school motto he established, ''Palmam qui meruit ferat''.

The Latymer School continues to honour his memory. A large painting of him hangs outside the Great Hall of the school, and in 1929, one of the two new school houses was named ‘Dolbé’ in recognition of his contributions.

== Bibliography ==
- Morris, Joseph Acton (1975). A History of The Latymer School at Edmonton. The Latymer Foundation at Edmonton. ISBN 978-0-9504862-0-8.
