= Old Suttonians =

Old Suttonians may refer to the former pupils of 3 schools:

- Sutton Grammar School for Boys in Sutton, London, England
- Sutton Valence School near Maidstone in Kent
- Sutton High School for Boys in Plymouth, England
