= Trefor Jones =

English Headteacher

Doctor Trefor Jones B.A, M.A, Ph.D
- Born: July 2, 1908; Aberdare, Glamorgan, Wales
- Died: August 1984 (aged 76); Lambeth, London, England
- Education: University College, Cardiff (B.A, M.A); Cardiff Institute of Education; University College, London (M.A, Ph.D)
- Occupations: Educator, Headmaster
- Known for: Headmaster of Dorking County School (1943–1957); Headmaster of The Latymer School (1957–1970)
- Spouse: Marion Edna Miles (m. 1932)
- Children: 3

Trefor Jones (2 July 1908 – August 1984) was a Welsh educator and headmaster, notable for his leadership at two prominent grammar schools: Dorking County School in Surrey and The Latymer School in Edmonton. A highly qualified academic with degrees in modern languages, he oversaw significant reforms and expansion at the schools under his charge, particularly at Latymer, which he guided through a period of social and educational change in post-war Britain.

== Early life and education ==
Trefor Jones was born on 2 July 1908 in Aberdare, a coal-mining centre in the Cynon Valley of South Wales. He was one of seven children (five boys and twin girls) of William Caswallon Jones and Jane (née Davies). His father, also a teacher, was headmaster of two local elementary schools. Though born in Morganwg, his family heritage was from Merionethshire in north Wales. The family were all fluent Welsh speakers, and Trefor maintained his fluency throughout his life despite living and working in England.

He attended the National School in Cardiff Street before progressing to the County School in Aberdare in 1919. He left school in 1925 to accept an entry scholarship to University College, Cardiff, graduating with an honours degree (magna cum laude) in French in 1928 at the age of 19. A talented football player, he represented the university, played for Cardiff City Reserves, and was chosen for a Welsh Amateur International trial. He subsequently gained his teaching certificate with first-class honours and distinction in practical teaching from the Cardiff Institute of Education. He later earned an M.A. (Wales) for a thesis on Alexandre Dumas fils.

Due to the difficult economic climate in South Wales in the late 1920s, Jones sought work in England. His move also enabled him to continue his studies at University College, London, where he obtained an M.A. in 1938 and a Ph.D. in 1952. His doctoral thesis was a study of religion and education in nineteenth-century France.

== Career ==
=== Early teaching career ===
Jones's first teaching post was at Truro School in Cornwall, where he served as French Master from 1930 to 1933. At Truro, Jones was a house master for Smith House and a prominent player for the school's football team. Match reports from the era frequently noted his goal-scoring in matches against both local clubs and in the annual "Boys v Masters" game. He left in July 1933 to take up a post in London, subsequently moving to a school in Mitcham before being appointed Head of French at Woking County School for Boys in Surrey in 1935.

At Woking, he coached soccer and cricket and became deeply involved in the Air Training Corps, serving as Flight Lieutenant and commanding officer of the 998 (Woking County School) Squadron. He also served as acting headmaster for several years during the head's illness.

=== Headmaster of Dorking County School (1943–1957) ===
In 1943, at the age of 34, Jones was appointed Headmaster of Dorking County School (later The Ashcombe School), a mixed grammar school in Surrey. He served in this role for over fourteen years, establishing a reputation not only for thoughtful educational leadership but also for deep engagement in the civic life of Dorking.

==== Educational Philosophy and School Leadership ====
His public reports and speeches from this period reveal a multi-faceted educational philosophy. At a 1950 senior school ceremony, he staunchly defended examinations as "tests of character" that measured "perseverance, industry and orderliness," not just intellectual gifts. However, at a separate junior ceremony on the same day with "Uncle Mac" of BBC Children's Hour as the guest speaker, he praised learning that occurred outside the curriculum. He remarked that while pupils received "no marks" for listening to the radio, he "always notice[d] that those who listen to the Children's Hour and can talk intelligently about it, are also interested in a number of other things- good books, music, nature study, etc." He stressed the "greatest importance" of the junior school's foundational work, regardless of examination results, and praised pupils' keenness for sports, stating the ultimate goal was "to produce men and women of the highest possible quality."

During his tenure, the school achieved significant academic results in a wide range of rigorous subjects, including Latin, sciences, and advanced mathematics, regularly securing Open University, State, and County Major Scholarships. At the same time, Jones publicly voiced frustrations that would define many post-war headmasters: a national shortage of staff, which he attributed to the teaching profession being "no longer attractive," and bureaucratic delays in school improvements, famously remarking he had been "queuing for a boiler since 1946." He argued that schools were "living societies" that needed "imaginative and adaptable leadership" over rigid, top-down planning. His pastoral role was evident in a tribute he wrote upon the death of a 19-year-old former pupil, praising not only his "outstanding intellectual capacity" but also his modesty, cheerfulness, and valuable contributions to school life as a prefect and secretary of the Science Society.

==== Community and Civic Engagement ====
Beyond his duties as Headmaster, Jones was a central figure in Dorking's community organisations. He served as the Chairman of the Dorking and District Youth Council, where he oversaw leadership training programs, fundraising for youth camps, and the organisation of sporting leagues and rallies. He was also elected President of the Dorking County Grammar School Parents' Association and held the position of Deputy Master of the Dorking Guild, a town-wide association of voluntary organisations, where he advocated for the creation of community centres to enrich the lives of residents.

Jones actively fostered strong ties between the school and the wider community. He supported the school's alumni association, the Old Dorkinians, and served as Vice-President of the Old Dorkinian Football Club, speaking at their annual supper about the post-war challenges of finding qualified sports coaches. In a notable example of his commitment to local sport, he provided the school's facilities for the Dorking St. Paul's Athletic Club's winter activities and encouraged his pupils to join, earning public praise for his support in helping the club produce national and international champions. His prominent local standing was further reflected in his roles at civic events, such as introducing the Bishop of Guildford at a Moral Welfare meeting and reading the King's message at the district's Empire Youth Sunday service.

=== Headmaster of The Latymer School (1957–1970) ===
In 1957, Jones was appointed Headmaster of The Latymer School in Edmonton, a large mixed grammar school in North London. He held the post for thirteen years, retiring in 1970. His tenure coincided with a period of significant social and educational change, during which he oversaw substantial reforms to the school's curriculum, facilities, and academic profile.

==== Academic Reforms and Sixth Form Expansion ====
Upon his arrival, Jones identified several key challenges. A high number of pupils were leaving school prematurely at age 15 for the workforce, a practice Jones sought to curb by personally persuading pupils and parents to complete the five-year course. He also considered the school's G.C.E. Ordinary Level results to be unsatisfactory for a school of Latymer's standing. Furthermore, the sixth form was small, with only 79 pupils in 1957, with only 7 of them proceeding to university that year.

To address these issues, Jones initiated major reforms to the school's organisation and curriculum. He abandoned the practice of streaming new pupils based on their 11+ examination, instead arranging them in parallel forms alphabetically. Setting based on ability was introduced at the end of the first year. For the most able pupils, he established an accelerated four-year course to O-Level, which included the study of Latin, French, and German. Throughout his headship, he continued to adjust the curriculum, culminating in a 1968 scheme that offered pupils 67 alternative courses of study leading to the G.C.E.

Jones treated the expansion of the sixth form as a matter of urgency. He interviewed students individually to encourage them to pursue higher education and used funds from the Latymer Foundation to offer financial support. The school also established two Latymer Close Exhibitions at the University of Cambridge to encourage applications. These efforts led to a substantial increase in post-16 education at the school. The sixth form grew from 79 pupils in 1957 to 259 in 1966, and the number of students entering higher education rose from seven in 1957 to 80 by 1965.

==== Modernisation and Legacy ====
The Queen Mother unveils the opening plaque for the new building extensions at Latymer.

He also oversaw a significant modernisation of the school's buildings, funded in part by the school's Foundation after it gained control of its assets in 1959. Aesthetic changes included replacing dark tiling with terrazzo work and redesigning the Great Hall. A major building programme, begun in 1964, added 26 new rooms, including two science laboratories, new gymnasia, music rooms, a language laboratory, and dedicated sixth-form common rooms. In November 1966, these new extensions were officially opened by Queen Elizabeth The Queen Mother, who had also visited the school in 1928 as Duchess of York to inaugurate an earlier expansion.

Drawing on his own Welsh roots, Jones established a residential field centre for the school in Merionethshire, the region of his ancestors. A disused village school in Cwm Penmachno, within the Snowdonia National Park, was purchased and renovated by 1967 to provide pupils with a base for field studies.

His headship coincided with the move towards comprehensive education. When the Labour government of 1964 sought to end selective education, Jones and the governors argued for Latymer's unique position. A compromise was reached that maintained the school's status while extending its catchment area to the entire newly formed London Borough of Enfield.

== Personal life ==
On August 17 1932, Jones married Marion Edna Miles, a fellow teacher from Aberdare. The marriage was initially kept secret, as was common at the time when married women were often expected to resign from teaching posts. They had three children. Their son, David Jones, became Professor of Genetics at the University of Hull and later Professor of Botany at the University of Florida. Another son, Alun Jones, was ordained as an Anglican priest, served as Headmaster of Archbishop Tenison's School in Croydon, and later became Vicar of Twickenham. Their daughter, Avril, trained as a nurse and settled in Toronto, Canada.

== Retirement and death ==
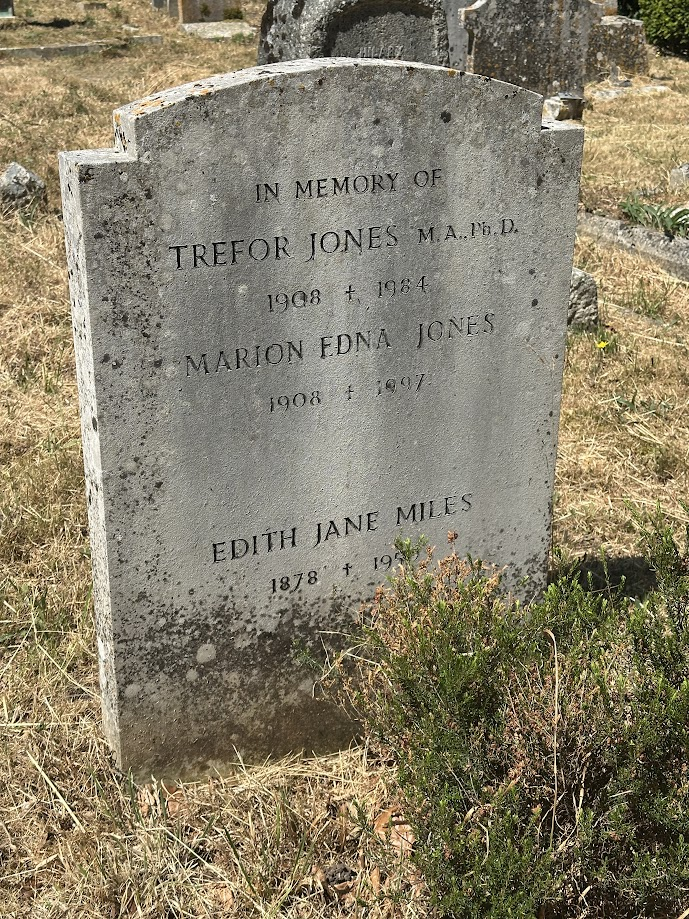
Grave of Dr. Trefor Jones

Jones retired in the spring of 1970 at the age of 61. In retirement, he continued to work in education, supporting teachers in non-traditional settings such as the Hendon Police College and in industry. Jones was active in the Rotary Club of Edmonton for many years, serving as Foundation Officer. Through Rotary, he hosted international students visiting London on Rotary Scholarships as part of the organisation’s educational exchange programme. He also played golf.He is remembered fondly by former pupils and colleagues for his personal dignity, concern for individuals, and what one contemporary described as a "puckish sense of sly humour" and "unexpected twinkle."

In the summer of 1974, he spent three months in hospital undergoing several major operations, which temporarily delayed his contribution to a factual account of The Latymer School’s history being compiled at the time by Joseph Morris.

He died in August 1984, aged 76, the day after attending a performance at Glyndebourne in which one of his grandchildren was singing. His funeral was held at St Paul's Church, Winchmore Hill on August 22, after which he was cremated. His wife Marion died in 1997 and her ashes were interred with his in St. Michael's Churchyard, Mickleham. As a memorial to his headship, the Governors of The Latymer School converted the old gymnasium into a lecture theatre, with the cost defrayed entirely from the Foundation's funds.

== Bibliography ==
- Morris, Joseph Acton (1975). A History of The Latymer School at Edmonton. The Latymer Foundation at Edmonton. ISBN 978-0-9504862-0-8.
