= Geographical Association =

The Geographical Association
- The GA logo. This version appeared in 2000. For a century before (since 1901) the GA logo had been a global map of the world, based on a Mollweide projection.
- Abbreviation: GA
- Formation: 1893; 133 years ago
- Type: Non profit
- Legal status: Registered Charity
- Purpose: Geography Education
- Headquarters: Sheffield, UK
- Region served: United Kingdom and Worldwide
- Members: circa 10,000
- Official language: English
- Chief Executive: Steve Brace
- President: Catherine Owen (2025-2026)
- Website: www.geography.org.uk

The Geographical Association (GA) is an association in the United Kingdom. The organisation has a stated aim of improving geographical knowledge of the public through promoting geographical education.

== Origins ==
The Geographical Association was formed by five geographers, including Halford John Mackinder, in 1893 as an independent, unincorporated association. The first members got together to use and exchange lantern slides, a leading technology of the day. The history of the first hundred years of the GA was published in 1993 and a more recently a chronological list of key people, events and achievements of the association up to the present day has been produced.

The current purpose remains the development of a community of practice for sharing teaching ideas, innovations and understanding about geographical education, but the GA also serves as a voice for and represents the interests of geography teachers in policy and practice initiatives through engagement with government.

== Constitution and Operation ==
The GA has approximately 10,000 members. These include primary and secondary teachers, trainee teachers (student teachers), teacher educators, academics, geography students, infant, primary and secondary schools, colleges, universities, academies, libraries, societies, museums and businesses. Although a UK-based organisation, there are members in more than 60 countries with strong links between geographical organisations in the USA, Australia and Europe. Its core activities are financed by membership subscriptions.

The Geographical Association was incorporated under the Companies Act 2006 on 28 January 2010 as a private company limited by guarantee (company number 07139068). Charitable status was subsequently conferred by the Charity Commission on 24 March 2010, under registration number 1135148. The GA had previously existed as an unincorporated association (registered charity number 31329) since its formation in 1893. The main motivation for the change in the legal structure of the GA in 2010 was the purchase of property, in the form the land and buildings that it had been occupying since 1997.

The GA is governed by a Board of 14 Directors. They are the legal members of the Geographical Association limited company and also its Trustees. This Board is called the Governing Body. The power to appoint Members of the Governing Body rests with the Governing Body itself, but the wider membership of the GA may, by means of the election procedures set out in the By-laws, make nominations for membership of the Governing Body. The Governing Body also has the power to co-opt up to three individuals (within the total of 14) to fill specialist roles.

Members make considerable input to the work and activities of the Association through voluntary contributions of time and expertise. Key aspects of geography education are developed through special interest groups and phase committees.

There is a network of 41 affiliated regional branches of the GA. Each branch has an autonomous constitution, broadly similar to the national association. Branches organise lectures for post-16 students, teachers and general public and a programme of professional development activities for teachers. Many run a regional Worldwise geographical quiz competition.

The education policy of GA is formulated by a representative Education Group, which oversees the activities of its Phase Committees, Special Interest Groups and Communications Boards.

In broad terms the priorities, plans and achievement goals for the GA are set out in a 5-year strategic plan which identifies the three key aims of the Association for 2014-19. These are 1. Meet professional and educational needs, 2. Demonstrate the value of geographical education, and 3. Use (the GA's) resources efficiently and sustainably.

The GA Office and headquarters is in Sheffield with a core body of professional staff who provide day-to-day and strategic services under the leadership of an appointed Chief Executive.

== Activities ==
Publications: Journals

The GA publishes three professional journals for members on a termly basis (three issues each year, based on the different phases of education viz. Primary Geography, Teaching Geography (aimed at Secondary/High school teachers) and Geography - its flagship international journal for post-16 students, undergraduates, teachers and lecturers. Geography publishes articles by leading geographers and geography educators that provide summaries and reviews of contemporary geographical topics and developments in geography education. The aim is to help 'recontextualise' the discipline of geography for educational purposes and also be a means for university academics to keep in touch with the school subject.

Publications: Geography resources

The GA produces and sells a range of resources and guidance materials for teachers for Early Years through to Post-16 teachers. These include the geographical adventures of a teddy bear called 'Barnaby Bear' (A Trade Marked product) for primary-aged children, Handbooks for primary and secondary school teachers, 'Toolkits' providing curriculum planning advice and lesson ideas for secondary school teachers, and a series of 'Top Spec Geography' booklets on contemporary topics aimed at AS/A2 level students. In addition at a more general level, the catalogue includes a series interpretive guides to areas of 'classic' landforms and the exploration of cities and how they have been shaped.

Social Media for geography teachers

News and information for geography teachers is disseminated via the GA website, Facebook page and Twitter feed. The GA also facilitates a series of Ning networks and communities for geography teachers and educators.

Resources for geography teachers

The GA website is a platform and depository for teaching ideas and resources. These are frequently updated as new geographical events occur or innovations in geography teaching approaches are developed. The GA also runs activities such as the National Festival of Fieldwork in June and more.

A manifesto for geography education

In 2009 the GA published a document 'A Different View' describing geography as 'one of humanity's big ideas' aimed at making a compelling case for geography's place in the curriculum, demonstrating the practical importance of 'real world' geography and the value of geographical thinking.

Campaigning for geography

The Geographical Association engages with policy makers and government ministers to constantly make the case for geography, with a strong involvement in curriculum reviews and Government education consultations. From 2006- 2011 the Geographical Association and RGS-IBG jointly led the government-funded Action Plan for Geography.

Geography subject leadership

The Geographical Association develops geography subject leadership at all levels, from new teachers during their initial training, to geography co-ordinators in primary schools, to secondary heads of department.

Annual conference

An annual conference rotates between locations in the north, midlands and south e.g. Manchester (2016), Guildford (2017) and offers a varied programme of lectures, talks, workshops and a large exhibition of geography education resources and published materials. The conference also includes a free public lecture and an awards event.

Training Courses

The Geographical Association runs a programme of continuing professional development events in different locations around the country.

Quality Marks

The GA operates a scheme whereby schools or geography departments can apply to be recognised for quality and progress and creative thinking in geography leadership, curriculum development, learning and teaching in school. The scheme encourages a development process using a self-assessment framework with submitted of examples of geography planning, lessons and students' work. Awards are made by a scrutiny panel of expert teachers. The awards are available for primary and secondary schools and are offered at Bronze, Silver and Gold Standards. Successful schools can apply for recognition as a Centre of Excellence. Evidence from schools that have used the Geography Quality Mark scheme indicates they find the evaluative framework a powerful and enabling tool for curriculum development.

Competitions

The GA operates a series of activities to engage students. Activities include local and online geography quizzes, photo competitions, a geographical model making competition and more.

Funded projects

Over a number of years the Geographical Association has established itself as a leading force in the development of innovative geography projects in partnership with a variety of high-profile funders, e.g. the government-funded 'Global Learning Programme' and the British Council 'Connecting Classrooms' programme aimed at developing critical thinking and problem solving in geography. The GA has been a partner or participant in a range of Europe-wide projects e.g. GeoCapabilities Project.

== See also ==
- Joseph Acton Morris (President 1965)
- Royal Geographical Society
