= The Latymer School =

Location
- Haselbury Road; Edmonton, Greater London, N9 9TN; England; 51.6250°N 0.0744°W

Information
- Type: Voluntary aided grammar school
- Motto: Latin: Qui Patitur Vincit ("He who endures wins")
- Established: 1624; 402 years ago
- Founder: Edward Latymer
- Local authority: Enfield Council
- Department for Education URN: 102055 Tables
- Ofsted: Reports
- Chair of the Governing Board: Carolin Schönherr
- Headteacher: Joseph Gilford
- Staff: 117 (as of November 2025)
- Gender: Co-educational
- Age: 11 to 18
- Enrolment: 1,380 (2023–24 academic year)
- Houses: Ashworth; Dolbé; Keats; Lamb; Latymer; Wyatt
- Colours: Royal and navy blue
- Alumni: Latymerians
- Website: https://www.latymer.co.uk

The Latymer School is a voluntary aided, selective, co-educational grammar school located in Edmonton, London. It was founded in 1624 by the will of Edward Latymer to provide education and clothing for eight poor boys of the area. Initially operating under different guises related to its foundation, it formally became a co-educational grammar school in 1910 when the site was re-opened on Haselbury Road.

The school has formal links with St John's College, Cambridge (Edward Latymer's College) and Corpus Christi College, Cambridge (the College of Edward Latymer's father, William Latymer) which have endowments which may be used for the furtherance of the studies of former Latymer pupils at those colleges.

== History ==
=== 17th century - Foundation and key endowments ===
My will is that my said Feoffees... shall... chuse eight poore boies inhabiting within the said towne of Edmonton... provide for everie of the said eight boies a doublet and a paire of breeches... and that on the left sleeve... a redd crosse of cloth or baies be fastened and worne... the crosse to be the Latymers crosse.
...Alsoe my desire is that... the said poore boies to be putt to some petty schoole... And that my said Feoffees... for ever contynue this course... unto the end of the world.

— Edward Latymer’s will, 16 March 1624

Edward Latymer (1557–1627), an attorney, by his will dated 16 March 1624 (Old Style, actually 1625 New Style), bequeathed funds for the education and clothing of eight "poore boies" of Edmonton. The will specified that the boys should wear a red cross on their sleeves, the "Latymers crosse". The implementation of Latymer's charity was delayed due to legal challenges to his will, and the Edmonton trustees did not receive their share of the estate until around 1633. Initially, Latymer referred to a "petty schoole".

Reverend John Brooke was licensed as the first schoolmaster on 16 March 1634, and his subscription is the first to mention a scolam grammaticalem (grammar school) in Edmonton. A dispute in 1635 between Brooke, the vicar, and a curate, Thomas Hale (Heale), resulted in a Consistory Court judgment that confirmed Brooke's right to "inioy the school and school-house".

Other significant 17th-century benefactors included Henry Smith, who left money for the schooling of boys in his will dated 1606. Sir. John Weld, who left gifts to the church and schoolmaster in 1622. John Wild, a wealthy shoemaker, whose will of 1662 provided for the schoolmaster of the "new schoole of Edmonton" and for scholarships to Cambridge. Thomas Style, in 1679, left a substantial rent charge for charitable purposes, including the teaching of twenty poor boys in "grammar and Latin tongue," indicating a desire for a grammar school education. The school was often simply known as "the school at Edmonton" or the "free school". The charities were kept separate, and boys were distinguished as Latymer's boys or Style's boys.

=== 18th century - Consolidation and the Hare/Ware masterships ===
The 18th century was characterised by the amalgamation of various charitable endowments and the long tenures of schoolmasters from the Hare and Ware families. In 1739, the various educational foundations, including those of Smith, Latymer, Wild, and Style, were amalgamated. This period saw the school operating from a schoolhouse in Church Street, near All Saints Church. The original schoolhouse site was expanded through acquisitions, including land bought with savings from Foundation funds.

The governance of the school often involved the local Vestry. In 1724, a crisis arose over the appointment of a schoolmaster, with Thomas Hare (son of a previous master, Benjamin Hare) wishing to succeed his father. The Vestry initially appointed Thomas Hare as parish clerk to teach the Latymer boys reading, writing, and accounts, while the Rev. John Button was appointed to teach the Style's boys grammar and Latin. By 1727, the vicar, Rev. William Washbourne, was appointed master, with John Whitby as usher.

Zachariah Hare, son of Thomas Hare, became schoolmaster in 1737. During his time, the educational charities were formally amalgamated, and he sold his house and its site (which extended over 1 acre) to the Trustees. This site, near the churchyard, became the established location of the school in Church Street. After Zachariah Hare's death in 1742, James Ware was appointed master to the Latymer, Wild, and Smith's charities by the vicar, Rev. F. Cooke, while Ware himself was selected by the Vestry to teach the Style's boys. His son, a second James Ware, briefly succeeded him in 1771.

=== 19th century - The Adams dynasty, decline, and Dolbé's reforms ===
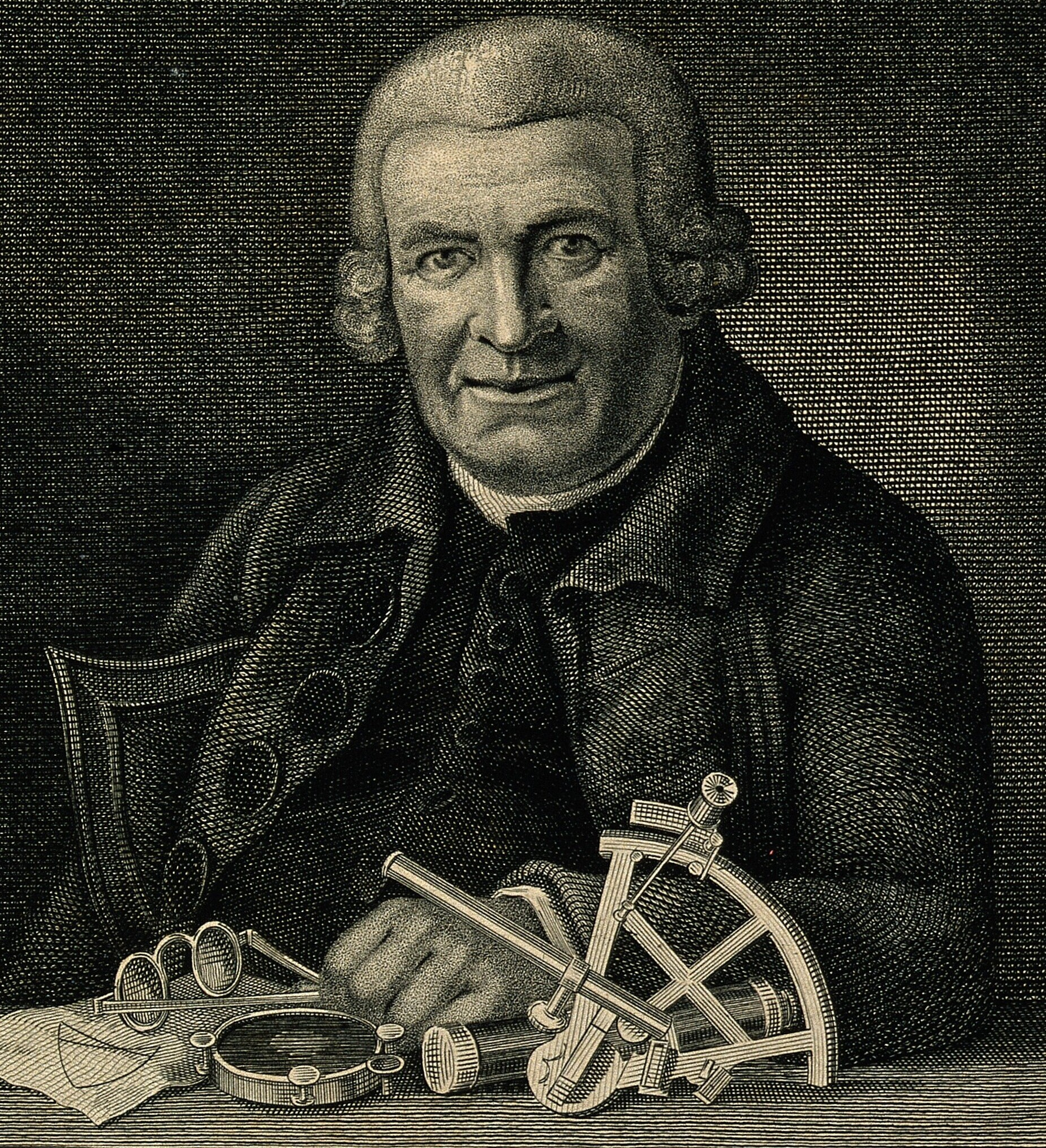
John Adams, headmaster (1781–1800)

The 19th century was dominated by the Adams dynasty of headmasters: John Adams I (appointed 1781), his son John Adams II (master 1800–1828), and his grandson Charles Henry Adams (master 1828–1867). John Adams I was an Enfield man with an interest in astronomy and mathematics, described on his son's tombstone as "Master of Latymer's School in this parish".

In 1811, a new schoolroom was built on land adjacent to the existing schoolhouse in Church Street, funded by a bequest from Mrs. Ann Wyatt. This building, known as the Wyatt schoolroom, bore an inscription noting its purpose to "promote the glory of God, and the good of poor children". At this time, the school was often referred to as the 'Boys' Charity School'. By 1823, the number of boys reached 81, of whom 20 studied Latin.

Latymer’s School as it appeared between 1874 and 1910, showcasing the original Wyatt building with Dolbé’s subsequent expansions

The long tenure of Charles Henry Adams was marked by a significant decline in the school's standards and financial mismanagement. Concerns were raised by the parish in the 1840s, leading to Vestry investigations. In 1847, it was noted that while the headmaster received £130 per annum and lived rent-free, many scholars were not receiving clothing as stipulated by the bequests. The Charity Commissioners conducted inquiries, with reports by John Simons (1858, 1864) and Daniel Robert Fearon (1865, for the Taunton Commission). These reports painted a bleak picture: poor quality education, low attendance, inadequate buildings, and a master (C.H. Adams) described as "untrained and without university degree."

The school was primarily providing elementary education, and the Latymer livery, a blue frock or tunic with a red collar and cross, was still worn. Financial irregularities were also severe; a Vestry committee in 1862 found a sum of £962 unaccounted for by the Trustees. C.H. Adams eventually agreed to repay a deficit from his salary as Master and Collector. He resigned in 1867 following Fearon's damning report for the Taunton Commission.

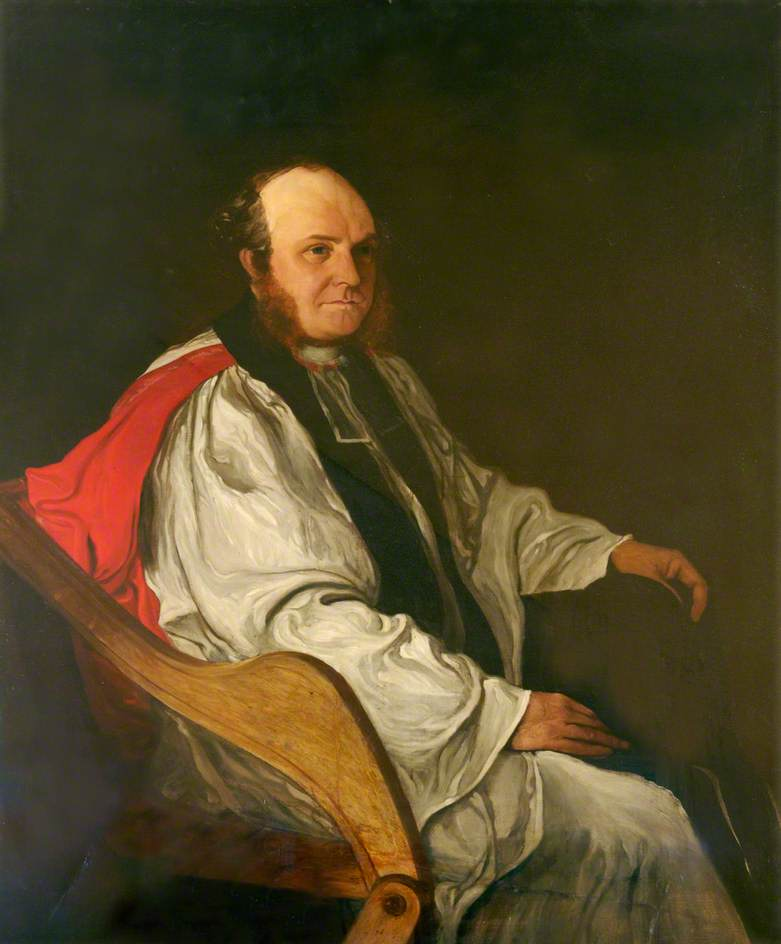
Rev. Dr. Charles V. Dolbé, headmaster (1867–1897)

The resignation of Adams in 1867 marked a significant turning point for Latymer. Under a new scheme drafted by the Trustees, the school's purpose was fundamentally redefined. To lead this change, the Rev. Dr. Charles Vincent Dolbé, a Cambridge graduate, was appointed headmaster on 27 September 1867.

Under Dolbé's leadership, the school was restructured into an "Upper" and "Lower" school, shifting its mission from a charity primarily for "poor boys" to a "Middle Class School" designed to serve the sons of Edmonton's local shopkeepers, civil servants, and professional people. The provision of free clothing, a staple of the old foundation, was abolished in favour of modernising the curriculum.

The revitalisation proved highly successful, reversing the school's decline. Pupil numbers grew rapidly, from near collapse to 159 by the end of Dolbé's first year and exceeding 200 within five years. This rapid growth necessitated a significant expansion of the Church Street premises. The old Wyatt schoolroom was first extended in 1868, and further rooms were added in 1874 to accommodate the larger student body.

During this era, the school adopted the motto "Palmam Qui Meruit Ferat" ("Let he who merits the palm bear it"), reflecting its new ethos of achievement. A vibrant extracurricular life also developed, with school football teams competing against local clubs such as Hotspur. After a transformative thirty-year headship, Dolbé retired in 1897, leaving the school a respected and thriving institution.

=== 20th century - Relocation and expansion on Haselbury Road ===
William A. C. Shearer, headmaster (1897–1909)

William Shearer succeeded Dolbé as headmaster in September 1897, aiming to modernise the school's curriculum by balancing traditional subjects with science and commercial preparation. From 1898, plans were developed for a new school building on a fresh site, as the existing Church Street premises were deemed inadequate. However, these plans faced considerable local opposition and protracted delays from the Charity Commissioners, hindering progress.

The continued delays meant the Church Street site remained in "appalling conditions" and an attempt in 1904 to get Governors' approval for adapting the old buildings was unsuccessful. The school entered a period of "drift," failing to gain recognition as a secondary school from the Board of Education. An inspection in December 1907 condemned the school's premises as "tumble-down, squalid, and utterly inadequately equipped," with pupil numbers having fallen to 56. The inspectors deemed the school's situation an "unhappy stage" that needed to end.

A new scheme was eventually agreed, and in 1909 control of the Latymer Foundation was effectively handed to the Middlesex County Council. A new governing body was formed, which included Colonel Henry Ferryman Bowles, a Representative Governor and County Alderman who acted as a primary link between the school and the Council. Despite Shearer’s acceptance of the new conditions, the new governing body decided at a meeting on 26 July 1909 to terminate his appointment and close the school. The motion, proposed by Bowles, cited the school’s £442 bank overdraft and the lack of remaining pupils. Under the terms of the resolution, Shearer was given six months' notice, extending his official tenure until 25 March 1910; however, the school effectively ceased teaching at the end of the 1909 autumn term.

Shearer defended his tenure, highlighting the "squalid and starved conditions" under which the school had operated. The Church Street school ceased to operate, and an envelope addressed to the Headmaster in June 1910 was returned by the postman endorsed 'SCHOOL ABOLISHED'. This marked the end of an era for the old school premises, which was sold for £400, and paved the way for its re-establishment on a new site under different governance.

Richard Ashworth, headmaster (1910–1928)

The new Latymer School, for boys and girls, opened on the nearby Haselbury Road in September 1910, with Richard Ashworth as its first headmaster. Ashworth was a dynamic and inspirational leader who established the ethos and traditions of the new co-educational grammar school. Central to this new identity was the motto Qui Patitur Vincit ('He who endures, conquers'). This replaced the Dolbé focus on merit alone with a new ethos of perseverance and character. Under Ashworth's leadership, the school became the site of a major educational experiment driven by the Middlesex Education Committee. This experiment was twofold: to test the practicability of an "extra large" secondary school, double the size of its contemporaries, and to assess the impact of widening access by increasing the intake of 11+ examination pupils from 5% to over 25% of the local age group.

As a direct result of this policy, the school rapidly grew from its initial intake of just 27 pupils, leading to the creation of the house system. It started with Latymer (after Edward Latymer) and Wyatt (after Ann Wyatt) House, and later expanded to include Keats and Lamb. They were accommodated in the original 1910 building (which is what would later be known as the Small Hall). During the First World War, the school community undertook numerous philanthropic activities, driven by the declared aim of 'character building through the cultivation of an altruistic spirit'. These efforts were varied and practical, with pupils assisting farmers with the harvest and the school hosting entertainment parties and theatrical performances for wounded soldiers from the Edmonton Military Hospital. A notable example of the school's early drama was a production of 'A Midsummer Night's Dream'.

The inter-war period saw significant expansion of the school facilities and life. To maintain the school's growing community, the Latymer Old Students' Association was formally established at a general meeting on 29 March 1919, with Ashworth serving as its first President. The association quickly expanded to include affiliated old student sports teams and a tennis club. In August 1924, construction began on a new northern wing comprising twelve classrooms, which increased student accommodation from 150 to 355 upon its opening in early 1926. The £14,677 cost was met directly by the Latymer Foundation after the Board of Education declined to fund the project, a decision that caused local controversy regarding the use of charitable funds.

Opening of the Great Hall by the Duke and Dutchess of York - 27 October 1928

A larger expansion followed on the south side of the site, costing £67,380 and initially raising capacity to 900 pupils. Built by H. Knight & Son of Tottenham, the new facilities (which included science laboratories and a Great Hall seating over 1,000) were officially opened on 27 October 1928 by the Duke and Duchess of York (later King George VI and Queen Elizabeth). The visit was the first royal civic function in Edmonton in many years, drawing an estimated 20,000 spectators who lined a procession route through Fore Street, the Broadway, and Church Street. Upon arrival, a guard of honour was provided by 120 members of the British Legion, and the Duke spent several minutes speaking with disabled ex-servicemen before entering the school.

The formal ceremony in the Great Hall included an "Address of Welcome" that highlighted Edmonton’s literary heritage as the home of John Keats and Charles Lamb. During the proceedings, the Duke delivered a speech advocating for the "interchange of ideas on educational matters" across the British Empire. The event concluded with a religious service of dedication and a concert featuring the Junior Boys’ Choir and English folk songs. To commemorate the visit, the Duke requested that the headmaster grant the pupils a full school holiday, and a "seat of honour" was given to sixteen "old scholars" who had attended the opening of the school’s previous buildings in 1910.

Richard Ashworth died from pneumonia on 25 December 1928, only weeks after the opening of the new wings. His death was attributed to the physical strain of overseeing the school’s rapid development from a small local institution into one of the largest secondary schools in London, with a capacity for 950 pupils. The school community entered a period of significant mourning, culminating in a large funeral at All Saints Church where pupils occupied the side aisles and the student body provided floral tributes in the colours of the four school houses. Following a memorial service in the newly inaugurated Great Hall, the pupils were dismissed for the day as a mark of respect. In the interim, Senior Master James North assumed the role of Acting Headmaster.

Victor S. E. Davis, headmaster (1929–1957)

Victor Davis succeeded North as headmaster in September 1929. Davis assumed leadership during a period of institutional instability. His transition was marked by significant internal friction; his preference for independent decision-making over the established hierarchy led to the resignation of eight senior staff members within a few years, including James North and several long-serving masters who had been central to the school's earlier academic success.

The onset of the Great Depression fundamentally impacted the school's demographics and operations. The completion of the Hyde estate brought a shift in the student body, integrating children from local terraced streets with those from more affluent districts. Financial pressures forced 250 pupils to withdraw prematurely between 1930 and 1933 to pursue immediate employment. Institutional funding remained stagnant throughout Davis’s tenure; capital improvements were almost non-existent for nearly three decades, with building works limited primarily to air-raid shelters and essential sanitation upgrades. One of the few facility upgrades during this period was the conversion of two classrooms into a school library, established as a memorial to Richard Ashworth with partial funding from the Middlesex Education Committee. Despite these constraints, the school modernised its administration by introducing a formal praefectorial system in 1930 and expanded the house system with the creation of Dolbé and Ashworth houses.

During the Second World War, the school underwent multiple relocations. Following the outbreak of war, it was initially evacuated to Clacton-on-Sea in September 1939, where it operated on a shared timetable with the local grammar school. Latymer pupils attended lessons in the afternoons and used a large requisitioned house for evening activities. However, safety concerns and logistical difficulties led to the main body of the school relocating in 1940 to Tonypandy in the Rhondda Valley. A separate group was established at Mawnan Smith in Cornwall, where a strong communal identity developed among the displaced staff and pupils. By late 1940, many returned to the Haselbury Road site, which was then shared with Edmonton County School.

To accommodate the return, the site was heavily modified for civil defence; school corridors were designated as air-raid shelters with brick chicanes at each end, and the playing fields were dug up to form trenches and fitted with tall poles to prevent enemy gliders from landing. The school also utilised a conservatory or "glasshouse" situated on the upper floor of the science corridor to grow tomato plants for local residents as part of the "Dig for Victory" campaign. The school remained operational throughout the Blitz, despite significant damage to the playground at the Haselbury Road site from a V-1 flying bomb in June 1944. During aerial attacks, pupils were often required to shelter in downstairs corridors or under desks, though senior students frequently continued their Matriculation examinations on the floor of the Great Hall. Resource shortages during this period also affected the school's dress code; uniform rationing led to female students wearing pale blue dresses of various styles until the standard uniform was reinstated in 1948. On the afternoon of 7 May 1945, Davis summoned the entire student body to the Great Hall to officially announce that the war in Europe was over, granting the school a full holiday for VE Day the following morning.

The post-war era was defined by negotiations regarding the Education Act 1944. Davis and the Governors successfully opposed local political efforts to convert Latymer into a "neighbourhood" comprehensive school, which they argued would erode the institution's established academic standards. Although independence through Direct Grant status was considered, the school lacked the necessary endowment to remain self-funding. Consequently, a new instrument of government was sealed in June 1955, establishing Latymer as a voluntary aided grammar school. Davis retired in July 1957, having served as headmaster for 28 years. His departure was marked by the installation of a three-manual pipe organ in the Great Hall, funded by the Governors as a memorial to his leadership during the depression and war years, called the 'Davis Organ'.

Dr. Trefor Jones, headmaster (1957–1970)

Dr. Trefor Jones succeeded Davis as headmaster in 1957. Upon his appointment, the school faced a high rate of premature withdrawals, with between 30 and 37 pupils leaving annually before completing the five-year course to pursue local employment. Jones addressed this by interviewing fifth-form pupils and their parents to encourage completion of the sixth form. To eliminate status differences between academic streams, he replaced merit-based placement for new entrants with six parallel forms assigned alphabetically using the letters of the school's name: L, T, Y, M, E, and R. Ability-based streaming was deferred until the end of the first year, at which point the most capable pupils were selected for a four-year "fast-track" O-Level course.

During this period, the school’s curriculum was expanded to include Russian in 1964, and a seven-day timetable was introduced in 1959 to allow for longer instructional blocks in science and physical education. Jones oversaw a significant increase in university participation; the number of pupils proceeding to higher education rose from seven in 1957 to forty by 1963. To facilitate this transition, the Latymer Foundation endowed two "Latymer Close Exhibitions" at St John's College, Cambridge and Corpus Christi College, Cambridge.

The Queen Mother unveils the opening plaque for the new building extensions with Dr. Trefor Jones

During the mid-1960s, the school site underwent a major modernisation programme costing approximately £250,000. These renovations included replacing the 1910 tiling with terrazzo, installing fumed oak in the Great Hall, and adding 26 rooms to the campus, such as twelve advanced science laboratories, two gymnasia, a thirty-booth language laboratory, and specialist rooms for art and domestic science. These extensions were officially opened by Queen Elizabeth The Queen Mother in November 1966.

As these building works on Haselbury Road concluded, Dr. Jones sought to establish an outdoor education centre in Wales to foster character and self-reliance. In 1964, the Governors initially proposed transporting surplus temporary huts from the main school site to Snowdonia to create a base. However, following a search for a permanent site, the school instead purchased a disused village primary school at Cwm Penmachno from Carnarvonshire County Council in 1966 for a price between £4,000 and £5,000. Established as "Ysgol Latymer," the residential and field study centre was refurbished and hosted its first student trip on 30 September 1967.

Institutional life under Jones was marked by strict regulations regarding personal appearance, with specific prohibitions on long hair, jewellery, and unpressed trousers. To strengthen the school's connection with its historical roots, Jones formalised a programme of annual services at All Saints' Church, establishing the first Foundation Day Service of Commemoration on Ascension Day, 26 May 1960, to honour the legacy of Edward Latymer, alongside the annual Carol Service. In 1959, administrative changes granted the Governors fuller control over the Foundation's property assets, which provided a rental income of £12,000 to fund bursaries and financial assistance for school leavers.

Following the 1964 election, the school again faced institutional pressure to transition to the comprehensive system. Jones and the Governors opposed the change, arguing that the school's specialised facilities, such as its advanced laboratories, were specifically designed for a selective sixth form. They further contended that the Latymer endowment was intended for the benefit of the entire original parish. A compromise was eventually reached that maintained the school's selective grammar status while expanding its catchment area to encompass the newly formed London Borough of Enfield. Jones retired in 1970, having served as headmaster for 13 years. His departure was marked by the conversion of the outdoor gymnasium into a lecture theatre, named the 'Jones Lecture Theatre'.

Edward S. Kelly, headmaster (1970–1983)

Edward Kelly succeeded Jones as headmaster in 1970 and sought to modernise the school's academic structure. He encouraged the adoption of new teaching methods, including Nuffield science projects and modern mathematics. One of his primary reforms was the abolition of academic streaming. Kelly argued that separating the top band of ability caused unnecessary stress and restricted subject choices for capable students in lower streams. He replaced this with mixed-ability forms where students remained in their House groups for the duration of their early years.

Kelly also implemented significant changes to student governance. He abolished the traditional prefect system, contending that the selection of a small elite was arbitrary and that all Sixth Form students should share responsibility for the school's operation. In its place, he established an elected School Council in 1970, comprising 84 members to represent student views from every form. Acknowledging changing social attitudes, he permitted senior students to attend secular discussion groups on social and political topics as an alternative to the daily religious assembly.

During this period, the school once again faced the challenges of potential comprehensive reorganisation. In 1974, under the direction of Mike Brewer, the Latymer Madrigal Group won the BBC's Let the People Sing choral competition. That same year, the choir entered the Guinness Book of Records after singing continuously for 24 hours to raise funds for a North American tour. In 1977, following the Education Act 1976, the Governors successfully resisted proposals to convert the school into a comprehensive, instead putting forward plans for it to become a specialist music centre. Although this proposal was not fully implemented, it reflected the school's recognised musical strengths. Kelly retired in 1983, having served as headmaster for 13 years. His departure was marked by the construction of a dedicated Sixth Form accommodation at the south end of the school.

Geoffrey T. Mills, headmaster (1983–1998)

Geoffrey Mills succeeded Kelly as headmaster in 1983. His tenure was characterised by a transition from ageing facilities to a modern academic environment and a refinement of the school's organisational structure. While the House system was already in place, Mills significantly updated the school’s pastoral care by introducing a system of Year Tutors in 1984, which later evolved into the current Heads of Year structure. He placed emphasis on a broad educational experience, encouraging participation in sport, music, drama, and community work.

Mills identified the school’s science infrastructure as a priority; the twelve existing laboratories still utilised original 1910 wooden benches and lacked modern safety features like gas isolation. Following nearly a decade of lobbying the London Borough of Enfield, the school secured funding for a total refurbishment of the laboratories, completed in 1992. This was part of a wider reorganisation of school space that began in 1984, allowing teachers of non-specialist subjects to teach from their own form rooms, this led to a full transition to subject-specific classrooms in 1987. To fund these improvements and future capital projects, Mills established the Association of Parents and Friends (APFLS, now called the LPF) following an open meeting on 4 April 1984, creating a vital auxiliary funding stream that supported projects.

In 1989, the Greenwich Judgment prohibited local authorities from giving priority to borough residents in school admissions. As a result, the school shifted from serving mainly local pupils in Edmonton to operating as a regional grammar school, attracting students from across North London. During Mills’ leadership, the school managed this change, which led to increased competition for places, with applications rising from a few hundred to nearly 2,000 each year, and to a more diverse student body.

In 1990, the Governors and Mills initiated the "Millennium Project", a long-term development plan for performing arts and indoor sports facilities. To gain the financial autonomy required for such large-scale construction, the school held a parent ballot in 1992 and transitioned to Grant-maintained status on 1 September 1993, a category made possible by the Education Reform Act 1988. This status allowed the school to appoint its first professional bursar to oversee its turnover and independent building bids. Throughout this period, the school continued to operate as a selective grammar school. In 1995, Latymer was granted Technology College status, which provided the funding to expand the school's computer network and refurbish the Food Technology room.

On 16 November 1996, Mills officially initiated the fundraising drive for the new facilities. This phase established a dedicated campaign office and saw the selection of Nicholas Hare Architects to design the Performing Arts Centre following the acquisition of a £96,752 Arts Lottery grant for feasibility and design studies. In the months preceding his retirement, the school's physical environment was further improved through a "face-lift" of the north entrance and the installation of a school-wide pupil locker system funded by the APFLS. By mid-1998, community contributions had exceeded £500,000, ensuring the Millennium Project reached the construction stage.

In 1998, the DfES rejected the school's bid to extend its Technology College status. Mills said that the school had made considerable technological progress and had submitted a strong application with external support, but suggested that its continued identity as a broadly based "liberal Grammar School", with particular strengths in Mathematics, Science and Technology, had worked against the application.

Jackie Hardie became acting headteacher in May 1998 after Geoffrey Mills underwent emergency surgery, initially expecting to cover for him only until his anticipated return in September. Mills subsequently retired on health grounds, and Hardie continued as acting headteacher during a period of legislative transition. Under the School Standards and Framework Act 1998, Grant-maintained status was abolished, and the school returned to voluntary aided status in 1999. Although the Education (Grammar School Designation) Order of 1998 formally permitted the school to continue its selective arrangements, its long-term status remained subject to a potential parental ballot. This triggered a significant legal and political dispute with the London Borough of Enfield regarding the definition of "eligible parents." The school’s leadership and parent groups successfully argued that voting rights should not be limited to borough residents, but must include families from the school’s wider recruitment area to properly reflect the Latymer community.

=== 21st century - Campus expansion and modernisation ===
Michael J. Cooper OBE, headteacher (1999–2005)

Michael Cooper succeeded Hardie as headteacher in September 1999, inheriting this climate of political uncertainty alongside the physical realisation of the Millennium Project. The first phase concluded with the formal opening of the performing arts centre, named the 'Mills Building', on 29 June 2000. The completion of the building provided a dedicated home for the music, drama, and media departments, consolidating these disciplines into a single facility situated away from the main school block. In November 2000, the Jones lecture theatre was converted into new Sixth Form accommodation, while the original Sixth Form area was repurposed as a quiet study area. This development included the physical linking of the two spaces to centralise the Sixth Form management team.

During this period, the school’s technological infrastructure was overhauled to support its status as a reference site for ICT excellence. Between 1999 and 2002, the school refurbished its server rooms, established four dedicated computer suites, and completed a three-phase refurbishment of all twelve science laboratories to integrate digital recording tools and interactive whiteboards. In June 2004, the school launched the "Latymer Integrated Learning Environment" (LILE), a remote-access portal allowing students to reach the school intranet from home. The Davis organ in the Great Hall was also replaced with a new electronic instrument in October 2003 as part of a wider hall refurbishment.

The final phase of the Millennium Project focused on replacing the 1940s-era catering block with a combined sports and dining complex. To secure a nearly £3 million DfES grant for the project, the school launched the "Triple Five" fundraising appeal, which successfully raised over £300,000 through community initiatives such as a 24-hour sports marathon. Cooper retired as headmaster in 2005, having served for six years.

Mark E. Garbett, headteacher (2005–2015)

Mark Garbett succeeded Cooper as headteacher in 2005 and oversaw the completion of the complex, which was officially opened by HRH The Princess Royal on 18 May 2006. The ceremony, held in the Great Hall before an audience of over 1,000 students and guests, featured the unveiling of a commemorative plaque and a speech by campaign patron George Alagiah. The completion of the facility officially concluded the Millennium Project, providing the campus with modern catering and multi-purpose sporting resources.

In 2007, Latymer was officially awarded Specialist School status in the Arts, bringing in additional government resources specifically targeted at enhancing the Art, Media, and Drama departments. In 2007, Latymer established an international partnership with a school in Tanzania, facilitating teacher and student exchanges to collaborate on cross-cultural curriculum projects.

To celebrate the centenary of the Haselbury Road site in 2010, the school undertook the conversion of a former 1966 boys gymnasium into a 180-seat performance and gallery space. This facility, known as the Seward Studio, was officially opened on 23 February 2010 and named in honour of former head girl Dame Margaret Seward, who had served as the Chair of Governors from 1983 to 1994. The opening ceremony was attended by the Mayor of Enfield, Councillor Eleftherios Savva, and featured a performance by the drama department of extracts from the musical The Boy Friend. Centenary celebrations continued throughout the year, including the original centenary play One Hundred Years on Haselbury Road, performed on 7 and 8 July, before culminating on 24 September in a whole-school panoramic photograph featuring more than 1,000 pupils and staff and a gala dinner at the House of Lords hosted by Ted Graham, with a keynote address by George Alagiah.

In the summer of 2012, the school completed a major renovation of the concert entrance, renaming it the West Entrance. Designed to showcase the school's heritage, the entrance lobby permanently displays the original 1811 foundation stone from the old Church Street school, alongside a recovered stained-glass window featuring the Latymer School crest. In the summer of 2013, this entrance was further expanded with a complete redesign of the adjacent courtyard, introducing timber planters, student seating, and festive lighting to create a dedicated recreational space.

Maureen Cobbett, headteacher (2015–2025)

Maureen Cobbett succeeded Garbett as headteacher on 1 September 2015, following his retirement in July after ten years of service. Her early tenure was marked by a significant financial challenge; by late 2016, the school faced a potential budget deficit of £400,000 per annum. This was attributed to a £300,000 reduction in sixth-form funding since 2012 and a £450,000 increase in salary-related costs, including pension and National Insurance contributions. To address the shortfall, the school expanded its commercial lettings of the Great Hall and Seward Studio and launched a fresh fundraising appeal through the Latymer Foundation. Despite these constraints, the campus continued to modernise. In the summer of 2016, a major refurbishment of the school's front entrance was completed, and a new study area was created at the south end of the school for sixth-form students.

In September 2017, the school was added to the London Borough of Enfield's "Local List" of heritage assets, cited for its architectural quality, landmark status, and historic association. Physical improvements to the site continued with a major refurbishment of the Great Hall Corridor in the summer of 2018, replacing long-standing art prints with student work and archival displays. In late 2018, the school initiated a formal bid to the Football Foundation and the National Lottery to secure funding for a new artificial sports pitch. The project was designed to address a reported lack of high-quality, accessible sporting facilities in the local area and required the school to launch a fundraising campaign to match the required grant funding.

On 2 April 2019, campus developments included the formal reopening of the "Taylor Quad." Situated on the south side of the Great Hall, the quadrangle was renamed and fitted with commemorative plaques to honour the Taylor family, including Alderman Ernest Taylor (Chair of Governors 1968–76) and his son Tom Taylor (Foundation Governor 1992–2012). The project transformed the area by replacing old greenhouses with a versatile outdoor space featuring new paving and seating for students.

In March 2020, the school was forced to close to most pupils due to the COVID-19 pandemic, transitioning to remote learning via platforms such as Zoom and Microsoft Teams. During this period, the school’s science department donated over 300 pairs of safety goggles to medics at Whipps Cross Hospital and utilised the department’s 3D printers to produce components for personal protective equipment. Additionally, all remaining food stocks from the school kitchen were donated to the North Enfield Foodbank. The pandemic resulted in the first cancellation of the annual Summer Reunion and Foundation Day services in decades, with commemorative events and concerts being moved online.

During the pandemic period, the school completed two major infrastructure projects funded by the Latymer Foundation. Between April 2020 and late 2021, a £3 million project was undertaken to replace the school's failing heating system, including the replacement of every radiator in the main building. By late 2021, the school confirmed that funding for the all-weather 3G football pitch had been secured through a partnership between the Football Association and the Latymer Foundation. A core aim of the project was to provide a facility that would benefit not only Latymer students but also local primary schools and the wider Edmonton community.

The full-size 3G artificial grass pitch was officially opened in October 2022. Located on the northern boundary of the school field near Church Street Recreation Ground, the facility includes LED floodlighting, perimeter fencing, goal storage, and spectator areas, with a conservation buffer zone left to protect local wildlife. The pitch’s completion allowed the Latymer Old Boys’ Football Club (LOBFC) to return to the school site for training and matches after years of playing at various locations across the borough. During the same season, the LOBFC 2nd XI secured the Amateur Football Combination's '4 North' Division title, marking the club’s first trophy win in seventeen years.

In 2024, as part of the school's 400th year celebrations, a project was initiated to extend and refurbish the 1910 Ashworth Memorial Library. Designed by architects Ayre Chamberlain Gaunt, the scheme infills an underutilised courtyard with a single-storey structure connecting the original library, a 1960s art block, and a post-war sports block. This physical development was accompanied by a year-long program of commemorative events, headlined by a major anniversary performance at the Royal Festival Hall on 13 March that featured current and former students performing.

Joseph Gilford succeeded Cobbett as headteacher in April 2025, after Cobbett retired following a ten-year tenure that included a two-term extension to facilitate the recruitment process. His early headship coincided with the securing of philanthropic funding for a major library extension, which was scheduled for completion in late October 2026. In late 2025, Gilford addressed the pressure of annually "tighter" state budgets by launching the "Winter Appeal" fundraising campaign to replace the school’s aging classroom smartboards.

== School site ==
The Latymer School seen from Haselbury Road

The Latymer School occupies a large site on Haselbury Road comprising a mix of early 20th-century buildings and later specialist facilities. The campus is arranged around a central group of teaching blocks, with additional buildings for sport, performing arts, and sixth form provision.

The core of the site includes the Small Hall and adjoining rooms, together with the principal South Block, which provide general teaching accommodation. Additional classrooms are located in the North Block and elsewhere across the campus, supporting a broad range of subjects.

The Great Hall is the main assembly and events space, with a stage and seating for over 1,000 people. It is used for assemblies, examinations, concerts, and drama productions, and houses the Davis organ. The hall includes balcony seating and is designed to accommodate large-scale school and community events.

Science and technology facilities are distributed across a number of specialist laboratories and teaching rooms. These include multiple science laboratories as well as dedicated spaces for design and technology subjects, with provision for graphic design, product design, textiles, and food preparation. These facilities support both practical and theoretical aspects of the curriculum.

Creative and performing arts are centred on the Mills Building, a dedicated complex housing facilities for the Music, Drama, and Media Studies departments. Additional provision includes art studios and music rooms located elsewhere on the site. The Seward Studio provides a flexible performance and exhibition space with seating for up to 180, featuring adjustable acoustics, removable seating, and integrated technical control systems.

The Sports & Dining complex

Sporting provision includes gymnasia, indoor sports facilities, and a large outdoor playing field. A full-size 3G all-weather football pitch with floodlighting and perimeter fencing is located on the school grounds. The Sports and Dining Complex combines indoor sports facilities with a main dining hall and incorporates environmentally conscious design features such as natural lighting and ventilation systems.

Sixth form facilities are grouped in a dedicated area of the campus and include a common room, study spaces, offices for sixth form staff, and a servery. These areas are designed to support both independent study and social use.

The campus also includes a library and associated study facilities, alongside administrative offices and support spaces integrated throughout the site.

== Cwm Penmachno ==
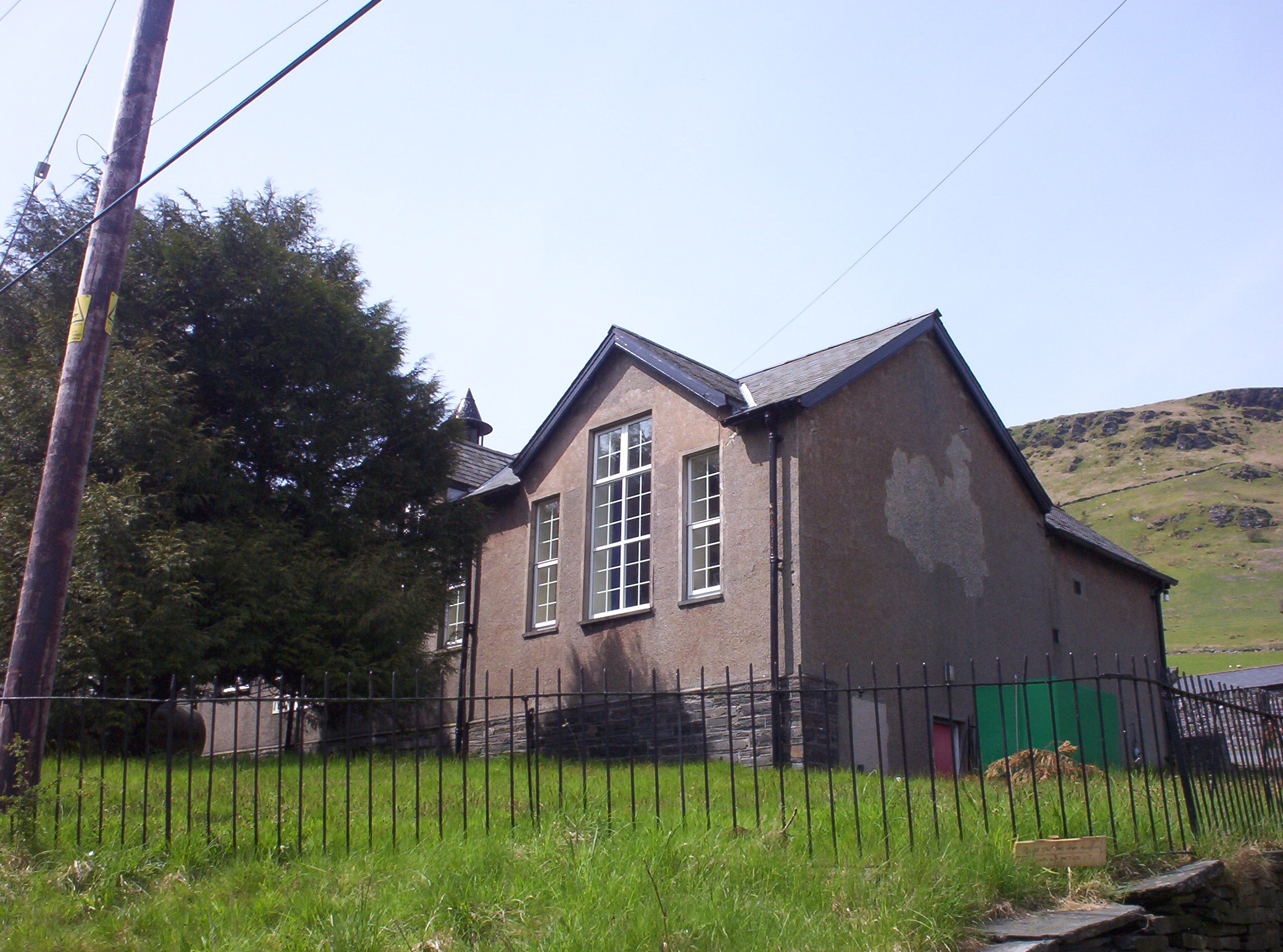
The Ysgol Latymer Outdoor Pursuits Centre

The school operates an outdoor residential and field study centre in North Wales known as Ysgol Latymer (translating from Welsh as "Latymer School"). Located in the village of Cwm Penmachno within Snowdonia National Park.

The facility features two main dormitories sleeping up to 35 people, two separate bunk rooms accommodating up to seven staff members, a communal kitchen, a common lounge area, and a kit utility room.

The development of the centre and the school's outdoor education curriculum was heavily led by staff member Jim Ridge, who served as the Head of Outdoor Education and resident warden of Ysgol Latymer from 1975 until his retirement in 2014.

The centre has a capacity of up to 40 students and hosts Year 7 students on week-long residential trips to help them build relationships within their form groups. During their stay, students participate in outdoor pursuits such as hiking (including ascents of local peaks like Manod Mawr), canoeing, and abseiling at local underground adventure sites. Excursions are also made to regional landmarks such as Conwy, Swallow Falls, Betws-y-Coed, and Mount Snowdon, culminating in a visit to the Zip World adventure park on the final day of the trip.

== House System ==
The Latymer School has a house system in which students are assigned to one of six houses upon entry. The house structure is used throughout school life and plays a role in pastoral care, registration, and extracurricular activities.

The six houses of The Latymer School are named after important figures connected to the school's history or the local area:

- Ashworth: Named after Richard Ashworth, Headmaster of the school from 1910 to 1928.
- Dolbé: Named after the Rev. Dr. Charles Vincent Dolbé, Headmaster from 1867 to 1897.
- Keats: Named after John Keats, the romantic poet who was educated locally in Enfield.
- Lamb: Named after Charles Lamb, an English essayist who died in Edmonton.
- Latymer: Named after Edward Latymer, the founder of the school.
- Wyatt: Named after Ann Wyatt, a benefactor who in 1811 funded the building of a new schoolroom.

From Years 7 to 11, each year group is divided into six Form Groups, aligned with the house system. These groups meet daily for registration and pastoral time. Students in Years 7 and 8 are taught primarily within their Form Groups. From Year 9 onwards, while Form Groups continue for registration and pastoral care, students are taught in mixed groups for some subjects. Form Tutors usually remain with their group from Year 7 through Year 11 and oversee aspects of academic and personal development.

=== History and Development ===
The earliest mention of a house system at Latymer is from the Fourth Annual Sports in 1914, when two 'new' houses, Keats and Lamb, entered the lists for the first time. They joined the two original house, Latymer and Wyatt. This four-house structure was established during the headmastership of Richard Ashworth, and inter-house competitions, such as those for the Cornish Cup and Harold Dormer Shield, became a feature of school life. The school's premier house trophy, the Dormer Shield, was originally presented to the school in 1923 by Harold Dormer. It was gifted in memory of his brother, Percy Dormer, who had attended the old Church Street school from 1882 to 1885 and died in 1922. Originally intended for outdoor games, it evolved to become the top annual award for the house scoring the most aggregate points across all sports and cultural competitions.

In 1929, under Headmaster Victor Davis, the system expanded to six houses with the addition of Ashworth and Dolbé. A prefectorial system was introduced at this time, which altered the student leadership dynamic previously held by house captains. Later headmasters continued to refine the system's function. In 1958, Headmaster Dr. Trefor Jones included the formal assignment of staff to houses, regular house meetings, and structured charitable activities associated with each house.

From the 1970s, the house system was more deeply integrated into the school's pastoral framework. Headmaster Edward Kelly established a structure where students were assigned to form groups that corresponded with their house, remaining in these groups for the majority school years. This was further refined by his successor, Geoffrey Mills, who introduced a system of Year Tutors in 1984, which later evolved into the Heads of Year structure.

=== Activities and ethos ===
The house system provides:

- Inter-House Competitions: (netball, football, hockey, tennis) and cultural (music, drama) events are held annually. The Dormer Shield is awarded to the house with the highest point total, and the Jones Cup to the runner-up.
- Leadership and Community: Events are typically coordinated by Senior Pupils and overseen by Senior House staff.
- Charitable Work: Each house organises fundraising events and community service projects.

== School Song ==
The school song was written in 1924 by Alice W. Linford, an English teacher at the school, to commemorate the 300th year of the Latymer Foundation. The stanzas were composed specifically for the Foundation’s Tercentenary Dinner, organised by the Old Students' Association and held in the Council Chamber of the Holborn Restaurant, Kingsway, on 31 January 1925.

Presided over by Headmaster Richard Ashworth, the dinner was attended by 130 members and friends, including the oldest living “Old Boy”, Q. W. Quinton, the local Member of Parliament F. A. Broad, and Sir Benjamin Gott. A central feature of the evening was a toast to the “pious and glorious memory” of the Founder, proposed by the Rev. Dr. E. Dale, headmaster of Latymer Upper School, who quoted the couplet that became closely associated with the school: “Latymer's light shall never go out, No matter how the wind may blow it about.” Prior to the composition of the official school song in 1924, Latymer pupils did not have an anthem of their own and instead sang the Harrow School song, "Forty Years On", during morning assemblies.

Ronald Cunliffe, composer of the School Song

Although written for the tercentenary celebrations, Linford’s verses were later adapted as the Latymer School Song and set to music by Ronald Cunliffe, the school’s first Music Master. Its first official performance was at the Speech Day Ceremony of 1927.

=== Composition and style ===
Cunliffe’s score is composed in G major, a key frequently utilised for community anthems due to its bright tonality and accessible vocal range. Written in common time (4/4), the piece has a stately, march-like character.

The melody is defined by the use of dotted rhythms (eighth notes followed by sixteenths), providing an energetic drive characteristic of early 20th-century British educational music. The verse is largely stepwise and narrative, building toward a more expansive chorus designed for "a thousand strong" unison or harmonic delivery. Archival sheet music indicates a four-part (SATB) vocal arrangement, intended for choral performance supported by a chordal piano accompaniment that doubles the vocal lines.

== Ofsted judgement and school ranking ==
The Latymer School’s most recent Ofsted inspection took place on 15 April 2026 under the leadership of headteacher Joseph Gilford. This evaluation utilised Ofsted's updated reporting framework, which assesses individual categories against standard levels rather than assigning a single, overarching grade (such as "Outstanding" or "Good") to the school as a whole. Under these updated metrics, the school was judged to meet its safeguarding standards and achieved a "Strong standard" (representing practice above the expected level) in the majority of assessed categories, including Achievement, Attendance and behaviour, Inclusion, Leadership and governance, Personal development and wellbeing, and Post-16 provision. The category of Curriculum and teaching was rated at the "Expected standard", with inspectors noting that while pupils learn the curriculum very well, teachers should more consistently embed assessment approaches to check pupil understanding.

Prior to this, the school underwent a full inspection on 24–25 March 2022 under headteacher Maureen Cobbett, receiving an overall effectiveness grade of "Good". During this evaluation, the quality of education, behaviour and attitudes, and leadership and management were rated "Good", while personal development and sixth-form provision achieved the higher grade of "Outstanding".

Before the 2022 inspection, the school’s performance was reviewed through several targeted assessments. In February 2012, a subject survey judged the overall effectiveness of Information and Communication Technology to be "Outstanding". As a result, the school was designated by Ofsted as a national point of reference for the integration of ICT across the curriculum. In April 2011, an Ofsted interim assessment confirmed that the school had sustained the performance levels from its previous full inspection. That preceding full inspection, conducted on 25 January 2008 under headteacher Mark Garbett, had graded the school's overall effectiveness and its sixth-form provision as "Outstanding" (Grade 1). Earlier, in January 2005, a full inspection under headteacher Michael Cooper rated the school’s overall evaluation as "excellent" (Grade 1) with many outstanding features.

According to the 2025 'Parent Power' rankings published by The Times, the school was ranked 17th in the UK. In 2024, 86% of GCSE examinations achieved A-grades (17th nationwide), while 68% of entries gained A-grades at A-level and 87% obtained A or B grades (21st nationwide).

== Leadership ==
=== Headteachers ===
==== Church Street ====
- Rev. John Brooke (1634–c.1660s)
- Thomas Hare (1662-1666)
- Daniel Callis (1666–1667)
- John Hare (1667–1679)
- Benjamin Hare (1679–1723)
- Thomas Hare II & Rev. John Button (1724 – c.1727)
- John Whitby (c.1727 – 1737)
- Zachariah Hare (1737–1742)
- James Ware (1742–1771)
- James Ware II (1771–1772)
- James Draper (1772–1773)
- Samuel Draper (1773–1780)
- John Adams (1781–1800)
- John Adams II (1800-1828)
- Charles Henry Adams (1828–1867)
- Rev. Dr. Charles Vincent Dolbé (1867–1897)
- William Alexander Campbell Shearer (1897–1909)

==== Haselbury Road ====
- Richard Ashworth (1910–1928)
- James North (1928–1929) - Acting Headteacher
- Victor Samuel England Davis (1929–1957)
- Dr. Trefor Jones (1957–1970)
- Edward Stanley Kelly (1970–1983)
- Geoffrey Thomas Mills (1983-1998)
- Jackie Hardie (1998-1999) - Acting Headteacher
- Michael John Cooper OBE (1999-2005)
- Mark Edward Garbett (2005-2015)
- Maureen Cobbett (2015-2025)
- Joseph Gilford (2025–Incumbent)

=== Chairs of Governors ===
- Rev. Ernest Arthur Blackwell Sanders (1902–1917)
- William Delph Cornish (1917–1920)
- Rev. Reginald Crosswell Evill (1920–1940)
- Edmund Thomas Rhymer JP (1940–1957)
- Cllr. Thomas Henry Joyce OBE (1957–1968)
- Ald. Ernest Samuel Taylor (1968–1976)
- Sarah Gladys Child (1976–1981)
- Prof. Huia Masters Pickard (1981–1983)
- Margaret Helen Elizabeth Seward CBE (1983–1994)
- Ian L. Pilsworth (1994–2015)
- Mark R. Sutters (2015–2016)
- Harry Richardson (2016) - Interim
- Jackie Hardie (2016–2017) - Interim
- Stephen David Way (2017–2026)
- Carolin Schönherr (2026–Incumbent)

== Notable former pupils ==
In entertainment

- Evelyn Ankers, actress, known as "the Queen of the B movies"
- Clare-Hope Ashitey, actress
- Eileen Atkins, actress
- Bruce Forsyth, entertainer
- Tim Pope, director
- Leslie Welch, radio and television personality, the Memory Man
- Aubrey Woods, actor, best known for performing "The Candy Man" in the 1971 film Willy Wonka and the Chocolate Factory
- Vivian Oparah, actress
- Jasmine Blackborow, actress
- Ritchie Coster, actor
- Dex Lee, actor
- Joe Shaw, actor and director
- Max Bennett, actor
- Olivia D’Lima, actress

In politics

- Syed Kamall, professor of politics
- Albert Meltzer, anarcho-communist writer
- Ash Sarkar, British journalist and left-wing political activist
- David Walder, Conservative Party politician

In academia

- Mark Abrams, social scientist
- Margaret Seward, First Female Chief Dental Officer
- John Horlock, vice-chancellor, Open University, 1981–90
- Liz Jolly, Chief Librarian, The British Library (from 2018)
- John Prebble, historian and novelist
- Stephen Wheatcroft, economist and civil aviation expert influential in founding of British Airways
- Yorick Wilks, artificial intelligence pioneer
- Q. D. Leavis, literary critic and essayist
- Derek Savage, pacifist poet

In sport

- Ted Blake, trampoline pioneer
- Johnny Haynes, former Fulham F.C. and England football captain
- Leslie Medley, former Spurs and England footballer.
- Arthur Sanders, footballer
- Mark Warburton, formerly manager of Queens Park Rangers
- Greg Herald, footballer

In music

- James Blake, British electronic artist
- Grace Chatto, cellist in British electronic music band Clean Bandit
- Richard Cook, music writer, former executive of PolyGram records
- B.J. Wilson, original drummer of Procol Harum
- Ivana Gavrić, British pianist
- Tom Coult, British composer

Other

- Nick Holtam, 78th bishop of Salisbury
- Philip North, bishop of Blackburn
- Clive Sheldon, High Court judge
- Helen Cliffton, Commissioner in The Salvation Army

== Notes ==
a.During this period, the role was divided. Thomas Hare taught the Latymer boys, while Rev. Button taught the Style's boys, making them effectively joint masters.

b.Whitby was the de facto master, serving as the 'usher' and running the school. The official title was held by the Vicar of Edmonton, Rev. William Washbourne.

c.For his entire 29-year tenure, James Ware was the de facto master, serving as the 'usher'. The official title was held successively by two vicars who did not teach: Rev. F. Cooke (1742–1765) and Rev. William Pinckney (1765–1771).

d.Following the sudden death of Richard Ashworth, James North served as Acting Headteacher until the appointment of his successor, Victor S. E. Davis.

e.Following the sudden retirement of Geoffrey Mills due to ill health, Jackie Hardie served as Acting Headteacher for four terms until the appointment of his successor, Michael Cooper.

== Bibliography ==
- Morris, Joseph Acton (1975). A History of The Latymer School at Edmonton. The Latymer Foundation at Edmonton. ISBN 978-0-9504862-0-8.
- Granath, Andrew (1995). Latymer Remembered Memories Of Latymer School 1882 - 1945. The Latymer Foundation at Edmonton. ISBN 0950541524.
- Cansick, Frederick Teague (1875). The Monumental Inscriptions of Middlesex Vol III (PDF). London.
- Seward, Margaret (2009). Open Wide: Memoir of a Dental Dame. ISBN 978-1-84104-107-0.
