= Ann Wyatt =

English philanthropist (1742–1811)

- Born: Anne Jarret; Knaresborough, Yorkshire, England
- Baptised: 17 September 1742
- Died: August 25, 1811; Shoreditch, London, England
- Burial place: All Saints' Church, Edmonton
- Other names: Mrs. Willis; Ann Wyatt (as per schoolroom inscription)
- Known for: Philanthropy, funding school facilities in Edmonton, including for The Latymer School
- Spouse(s): Daniel Willis (m. 1769–1805); John Wyatt (m. 1806–bef. 1811)

Ann Wyatt (baptised 17 September 1742 – 25 August 1811), born Ann Jarrett, was an English philanthropist known for her significant bequests to charitable schools in Edmonton. Her life, marked by two marriages, eccentric personal habits, and a strong will, culminated in a notable act of philanthropy that established a new schoolroom for boys and supported girls' education.

== Early life and family ==
Ann was born in Knaresborough, Yorkshire, and baptised on 17 September 1742 at St John the Baptist Church as Anne Jarret, daughter of Thomas Jarret. Her surname appears in historical records under multiple spellings, including Garard, Jarrett, and Gerrard, a common inconsistency in 18th-century Yorkshire parish registers.

She had at least one sister, Mary, who married Miles Hutton, a flax dresser, in 1760. Mary died in 1810, just a year before Ann. The couple had several children, including Mary Terry and Elizabeth Hutton, both of whom would later inherit the bulk of Ann Wyatt's estate.

== Marriages and identity ==
Ann first married Daniel Willis of Edmonton on 6 February 1769, with their marriage banns published at Christ Church, Spitalfields. Daniel Willis was buried on 10 March 1805, at All Saints Church, Edmonton. Ann held her first husband in high regard, reportedly stating, "I do love my dear first husband. He was such a good man and let me do just what I liked, and I saved up such a deal of money."

Following Daniel's death, she married her second husband, John Wyatt of Kings Row, Bethnal Green, on 10 September 1806, at Saint Mary, Whitechapel, Tower Hamlets. This marriage was evidently unhappy; Ann later expressed intense dislike for him, calling him "a horrible, drinking swearing fellow," and stating she hated "the very name of him." She reportedly hid money from him, which he never discovered. John Wyatt died before her. They legally separated but did not divorce, sometime before 1811.

Despite her second marriage, Ann continued to identify herself as "Mrs. Willis" after John Wyatt's death. This caused initial confusion when her will was being drafted, as her solicitor doubted its validity if executed under the name Willis when her legal name was Wyatt. She was eventually convinced to execute her will under the name Ann Wyatt.

== Personal life ==
By 1811, Ann Wyatt lived alone at Somerset Buildings, Hackney Road, a neighbourhood described by contemporary accounts as "exceedingly unsavoury." Despite her considerable wealth, she appeared to be a "miserable looking, dirty pauper, so ragged and untidy" – so much so that the Rev. Dawson Warren, Vicar of Edmonton, initially thought she was in need of charity herself.

Her living conditions mirrored her appearance; she inhabited "a small house off one of the back streets near Shoreditch Church" that Warren described as the "most extraordinary habitation in which a poor miser could dwell." The sitting-room was in a state of "wildest confusion," filled with various articles, tables and chairs "piled one upon another," and numerous bonnets, cloaks, and gowns "hung around on pegs or on the legs of the inverted chairs." Everything was "so dusty and dirty" that Warren felt compelled to sit only out of "a sense of duty to [his] parish."

She was known for her eccentric habits, including hiding large sums of money in various places, notably "snug in a hole under the stairs." When asked about the possibility of any heirs, she insisted she had none and claimed that any relatives she once had in York must have died long ago. She recounted that she had not heard from them in years and once refused to accept a letter from one of her nieces because it had arrived without the postage paid. After that, she said, she never heard from them again.

== The philanthropic encounter ==
Her path crossed with the Rev. Dawson Warren through Thomas Harding, a stonemason from Tottenham. Harding had been commissioned by Ann to erect a headstone for her first husband, Daniel Willis, at Edmonton Churchyard. When Harding expressed doubt about being paid due to her appearance, Ann promptly paid him £10 in advance, establishing a degree of trust. Harding then informed Warren that an old lady wished to consult him about using her savings for the benefit of the poor of Edmonton.

Their first meeting was fraught with tension. Ann, still referring to herself as Mrs. Willis, entered the room and, after praising Warren's reputation, produced a handful of banknotes, exclaiming, "There's five hundred pounds." However, when Warren, perhaps taken aback or attempting to suggest a more formal process, hesitated or mentioned relations, Ann snatched the money back, declaring, "So you won't take it. Then you shan't!" She left in a "pet."

Five or six weeks later, Harding informed Warren that Ann wished to see him again. During their second meeting, Ann expressed renewed trust. Warren then wisely proposed using the money not just for "bread for the poor" (which he argued would lead to idleness), but for building a schoolroom to teach poor boys to read and write – a cause Warren had long championed due to the cramped existing school facilities. Ann was receptive to this idea, particularly insisting on a "handsome stone" over the schoolroom door with an inscription commemorating her donation. Warren also advised her to consult his attorney to formalize her wishes in a will and to invest her money, which she eventually agreed to.

== The Will of Ann Wyatt ==
The layout of the Wyatt Schoolroom in 1867

Ann Wyatt's last will and testament was signed and sealed on 31 July 1811, and subsequently proved at London on 30 August 1811. Her executors were the Rev. Dawson Warren and Thomas Harding. At the time of drafting her will, she held various financial assets, including £318 14s 6d in 5% Navy Annuities (in her name and that of Rev. Dawson Warren and Thomas Harding), £300 in 5% Navy Annuities (held jointly by Robert Wrightson and James Sibley in trust for her), and £800 in 3% Consolidated Annuities (also in trust). Her total estate was valued around £1,300.

The will outlined her specific bequests:

- Boys' Charity School, Edmonton: She bequeathed £500 from her Navy Annuities in trust to Rev. Dawson Warren and Thomas Harding to build a new schoolroom for the Boys' Charity School in Edmonton. She explicitly directed that a stone tablet be fixed on the schoolroom, stating it was built per her will, and that the donation be recorded in a visible place within the Parish Church of Edmonton.
- Schoolroom Maintenance: An additional £100 in Navy Annuities was given to the Vicar of Edmonton (or successor) to fund ongoing repairs of the schoolroom.
- Girls' Charity School, Edmonton: She gave £100 in money to the Governors/Trustees of the Girls' Charity School in Church Street, Edmonton, to support the school.

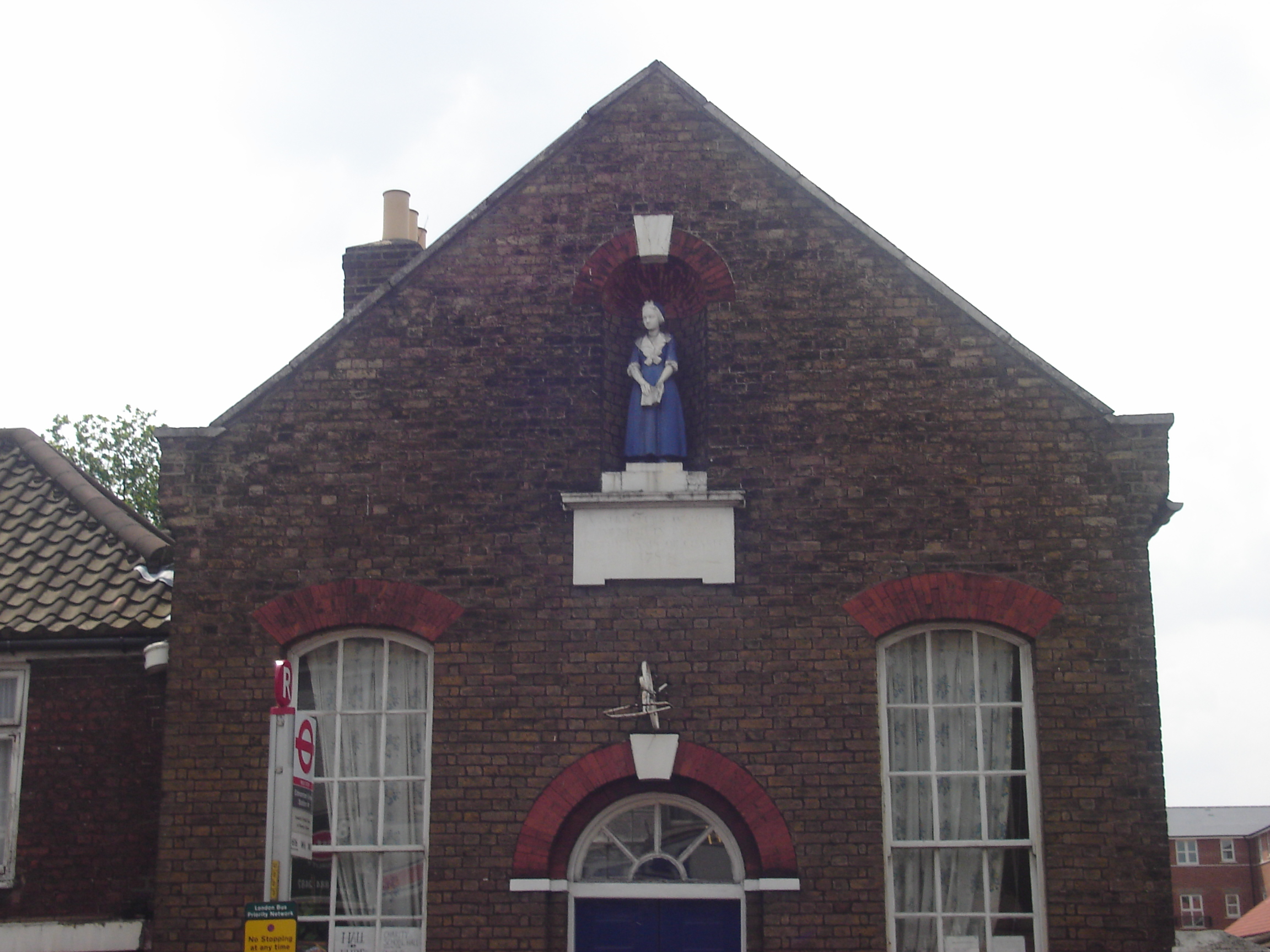
Girl's Charity School, Church Street

Beyond these charitable gifts, Ann Wyatt also left several personal legacies:

- £10 to Mrs. Sarah Buxton, "as a small token of my regard for her kindness to me when I was in my Troubles."
- £20 to Mrs. Wrightson, wife of Robert Wrightson.
- £5 to Sarah Stewart, niece of Robert Wrightson.
- £5 each to Ann Gillespie of Islington Road, Widow, and her eldest son William.
- £10 each to her executors, Rev. Dawson Warren and Thomas Harding, for their services.
- £200 (from 3% Consols, shared equally) to Sarah & Elizabeth Wrightson (daughters of Robert Wrightson)

The residue of her estate, including remaining stocks, annuities, household goods, plate, silver, china, and all other personal property, was to be equally divided between her two nieces: Mary Terry (wife of Thomas Terry of Knaresborough, York) and Elizabeth Hutton, both daughters of her late sister Mary Hutton.

== Death and burial ==
Ann Wyatt became unwell within three weeks of executing her will. Rev. Warren visited her and found her in bed. Despite his attempts to offer spiritual comfort, she declined to discuss it, stating she had "made up her mind and did not at the time wish to talk about it."

She died on 25 August 1811, found deceased in her bed on the Sunday morning. A person who was in her house at the time "immediately decamped." Warren, beginning his Sabbath duties, dispatched a faithful servant to keep watch over the premises until Monday morning. He then went with Mr. Harding and, after the undertaker had "paid every decent attention to the remains of the poor creature," they examined the premises. They discovered that the "hole under the stairs had been robbed of its contents," but found £250 in another room, adding to the total estate of approximately £1,300 recovered.

As per her will, Ann Wyatt's funeral procession, consisting of "one hearse and one mourning coach," left her house at 10 a.m. to "avoid hurry." She was buried on 30 August 1811, in the churchyard of All Saints, Edmonton, "as near to the remains of my first husband Daniel Willis as conveniently can be."

The disposition of her estate after her death highlighted the strained relationship with her nieces. Upon Ann Wyatt's death, her nieces, Mary Terry and Elizabeth Hutton, who were residents of York and had a "friend in the neighbourhood watching" Ann, traveled to London. They confirmed their identity to the executors and were granted possession of Ann's furniture, which they sold for £50, along with other personal 'pickings' she had alluded to.

After all debts and specific legacies were paid, the substantial remaining balance of the estate was handed over to them as residuary legatees. However, the Vicar noted that their initial "thanks and gratitude" soon "evaporated," as six months later, they dispatched a gentleman from York to challenge him regarding the estate's proceeds, indicating a contentious and mercenary approach to their inheritance. This greed was short lived however, as once Rev. Warren showed the gentleman Ann's Will, he apologised and said Warren "should have no further trouble"

== Legacy ==
Latymer's Schoolroom as it appeared between 1875 and 1910, Wyatt's original schoolroom being the middle section of the building

Ann Wyatt's most enduring legacy is the schoolroom she funded for the Boys' Charity School (also known as Latymer's Charity School) in Edmonton. Built in 1811, this building was a direct result of her significant bequest. An inscription on a stone tablet over the door commemorates her contribution:

This Schoolroom was built in pursuance of the will of Mrs Ann Wyatt, widow, who, to promote the glory of God, and the good of poor children, caused it to be erected at the expense of her estate - 1811

Her will ensured that the building would be permanently used as a schoolroom and maintained through her dedicated fund, significantly improving the educational facilities. Her contributions to the Girls' Charity School also provided valuable support for their education.

In the 1860s and 1870s, the school was expanded with the addition of two new classrooms. However, by the early 1900s, its facilities had deteriorated significantly. In an 1899 report, Assistant Commissioner Mitcheson described the premises, which consisted of three classrooms and a yard, as "about the worst I have ever seen," noting the absence of an assembly hall or rooms for special subjects. The boys' charity school ultimately closed in 1909 and was reopened as the Edmonton Latymer School. The original school building was sold for £400 and was later destroyed during the First World War. Despite this, the Wyatt name continues at the Latymer School, where it remains one of the founding houses, preserving her legacy in education well into the 21st century.

== Bibliography ==
- Morris, Joseph Acton (1975). A History of The Latymer School at Edmonton. The Latymer Foundation at Edmonton. ISBN 978-0-9504862-0-8.
- Cansick, Frederick Teague (1875). The Monumental Inscriptions of Middlesex Vol III (PDF). London.

== See also ==
- The Latymer School
- All Saints' Church, Edmonton
