= Michael Cooper (headmaster) =

British educator and school headteacher

Michael Cooper OBE FRSA MRSB
- Cooper in 1999
- Born: April 5, 1949 (age 77); Plymouth, Devon, England
- Education: University of York (B.A, P.G.C.E)
- Occupations: Educator, Headteacher
- Known for: Principal of The British School in the Netherlands (1990–1999); Headteacher of The Latymer School (1999–2005)
- Spouse: Gillian Mary Isted (m. 1975)
- Children: 2

Michael John Cooper (born 5 April 1949) is a British educator who has served as the leader of several schools in the United Kingdom and internationally, including the British School in the Netherlands and The Latymer School in London. He was appointed an Officer of the Order of the British Empire in 1997 for services to education. He currently serves as an Honorary Vice President of the Council of British International Schools, director of the King's Academy Trust and a governor of Truro College. He previously served as the Chair of the Peninsula Learning Trust and as a Director of the Tudor Academy Trust.

== Early life and education ==
Michael John Cooper was born on 5 April 1949 in Plymouth to Stanley Donald Cooper and Evelyn Joyce (née Norgate). He was educated at Sutton High School from September 1960 to July 1967. He subsequently attended the University of York, where he graduated with a first-class Bachelor of Arts degree in Biology, and a Postgraduate Certificate in Education.

== Career ==
=== Early career (1972–1985) ===
Cooper's career began in 1972 with Voluntary Service Overseas, serving as a teacher at Chassa Secondary School in Zambia. During this time, he taught agriculture. Following his service abroad, he acted as a selector for VSO from 1975 until 1990.

In 1974, Cooper joined the staff of Mill Hill School as Director of Biology and a sixth-form Chemistry master, serving until 1978. During his tenure, he held pastoral responsibilities as House Tutor for Collinson House until the summer of 1975, when he stepped down upon his marriage, and subsequently served for two years as House Tutor for Priestley House, whose report thanked him as an "invaluable House Tutor". Outside the classroom, he was Patron of the Natural History Society and served as Master in charge of Fencing, staff representative and mentor to the School Council, and an assistant with careers guidance and the Scouts.

Upon Cooper's departure in 1978, the school magazine described him as a "valuable member of the Science department" who had been heavily involved in the "pastoral side of school mastering at Mill Hill". In his farewell Foundation Day address, Headmaster Alan Elliot commended Cooper's teaching across all ability levels "to the most able and to the least" and remarked on his "constant belief ... that people will act responsibly if they are given responsibility", adding that many pupils had "responded to this faith in just the right way" and that the school owed him and his departing colleagues "an enormous debt".

He then transitioned to the state sector, where he served as deputy head of the upper school at Moulsham High School in Chelmsford from 1978 to 1981.. Between 1982 and 1985, he held the post of deputy headteacher at Valley School in Worksop.

=== Hillcrest School (1985–1990) ===
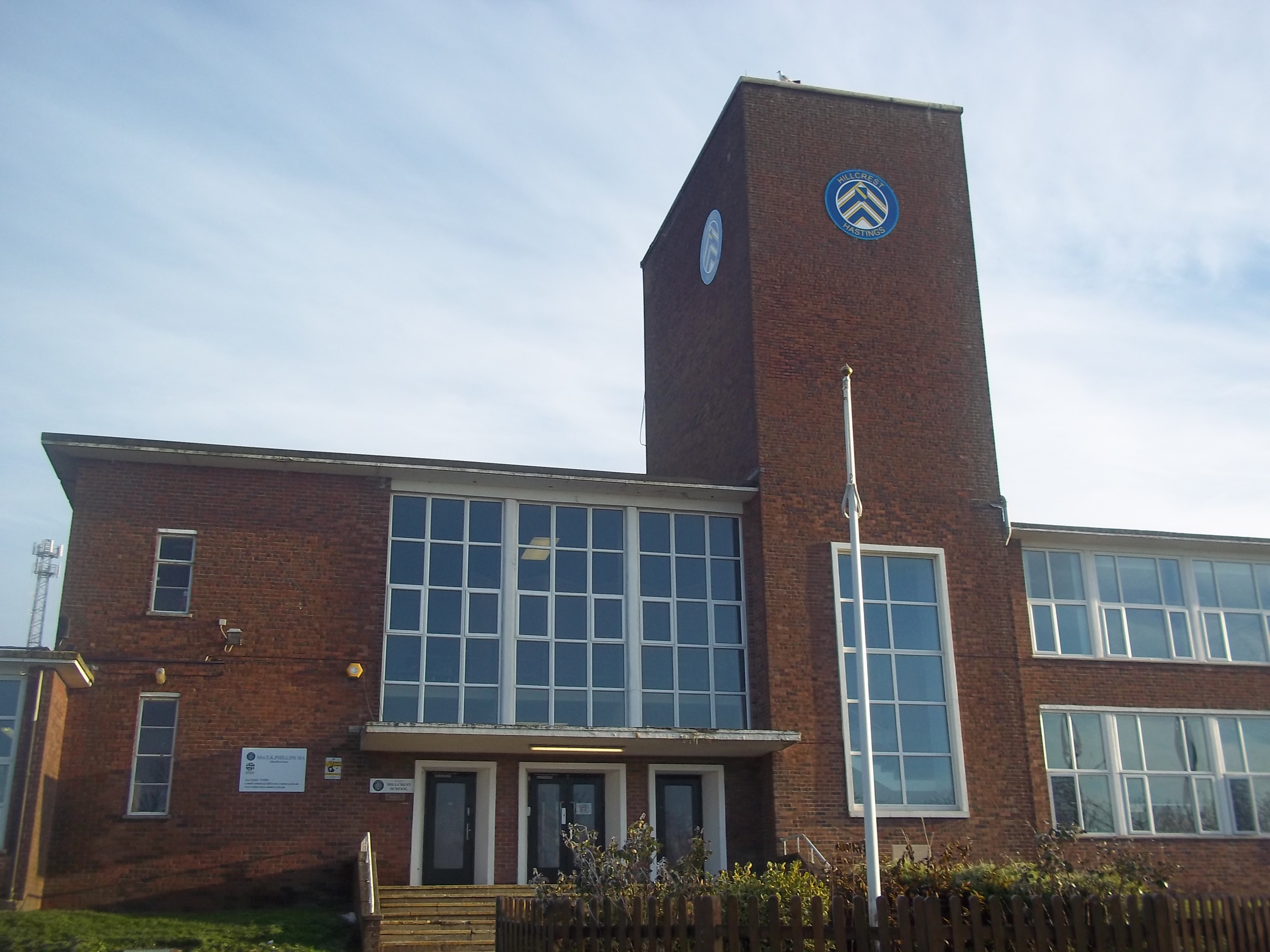
Hillcrest School, Hastings

In 1985, at the age of 35, Cooper was appointed headteacher of Hillcrest School in Hastings, an 11–18 co-educational comprehensive school with 1,200 pupils. During his five-year tenure, the school’s standards, examination results, and popularity increased to the point that it was considered one of the top schools in the county. Cooper focused on maintaining the academic standards established by his predecessor, Trevor Kimber, and developed strong international links with schools in France, Germany, and Spain. This included an arrangement where sixth-formers from a school in Schwerte, Germany, studied at Hillcrest.

Cooper actively campaigned for improved infrastructure, specifically supporting efforts to build a "dual use" sports hall for the school and the local community after years of seeking better facilities. He also worked to modernize the school's administration; in 1990, he nominated his secretary, Brionie Benn, for a national "Super Secretary" award, crediting her with transitioning the school office to a computerized system.

Cooper announced his departure in February 1990 to take up a principalship in the Netherlands. At his farewell presentation in July 1990, the head girl and head boy thanked him for his work in improving the school's reputation, while Cooper described the Hillcrest staff as the "best I have ever worked with."

=== The British School in the Netherlands (1990–1999) ===
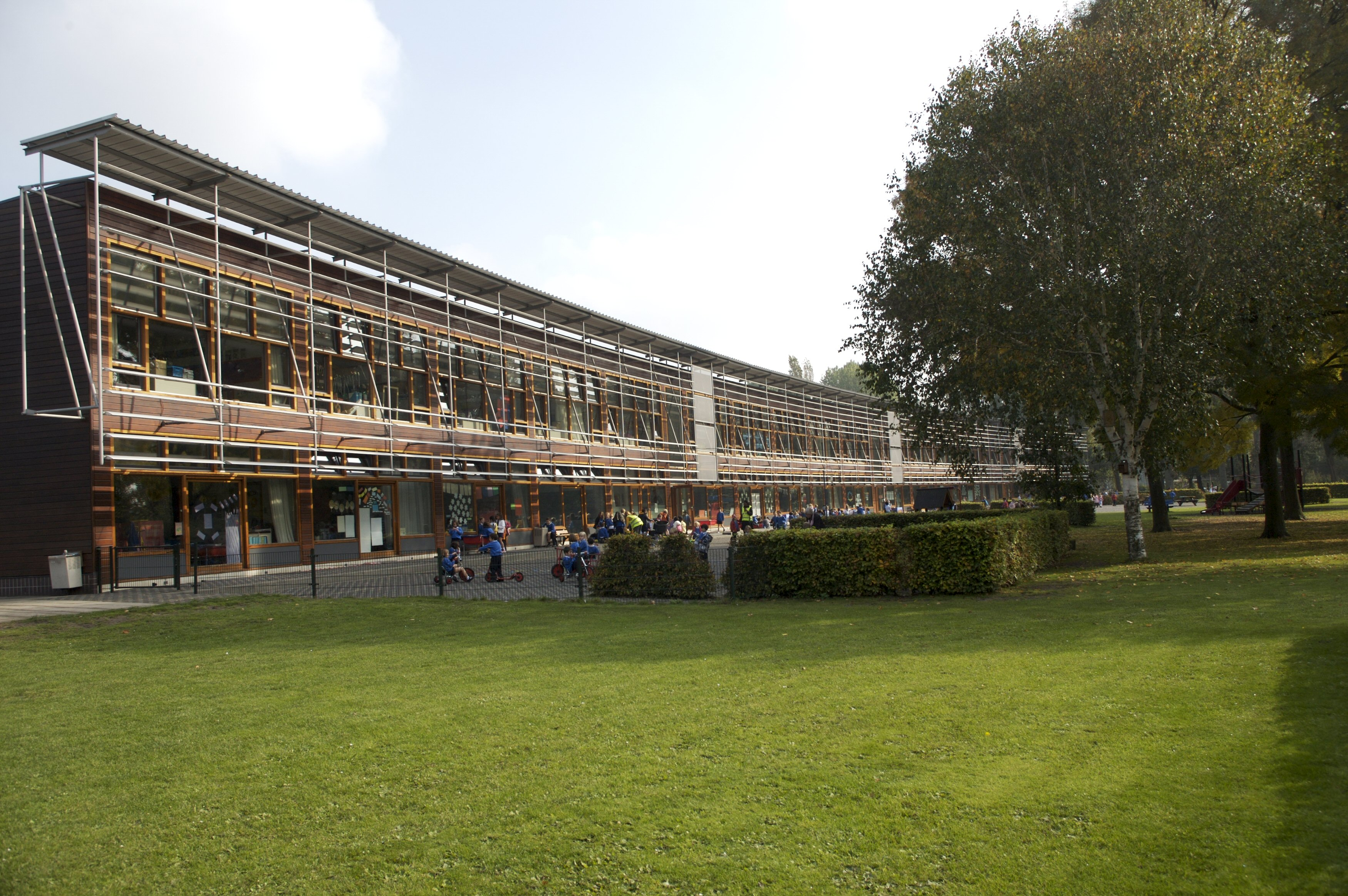
The Junior school in Vlaskamp, which Cooper oversaw the construction of

In September 1990, Cooper was appointed Principal of The British School in the Netherlands, a 3–18 school which eventually grew to encompass four sites with 1,400 pupils. He was drawn to the post because it allowed him to oversee the national curriculum across a broad age range, from nursery level to the end of secondary education. Upon his arrival in The Hague, he was tasked with constructing a new school building without utilising school funds. He successfully secured sponsorship from the international business community to finance the project, which solved a long-standing logistical issue caused by split sites. The completed facility received an architectural award for being the best-built school in the Netherlands. This project resulted in a "stunningly futuristic" building designed by Ove Arup, which featured a drama studio in the shape of an egg.

Cooper and the Duke of Kent (12 July 1994)

During his nine-year principalship, Cooper focused on fostering a "British spirit" of education that balanced academic discipline with a wide range of extracurricular activities, including sports teams that competed in Dutch national leagues and high-level drama productions. The school also hosted a variety of high-profile visitors from the United Kingdom, including the Archbishop of Canterbury, humanitarian Terry Waite, astronomer Sir Patrick Moore, broadcaster David Bellamy, and the Duke and Duchess of Kent. In June 1994, the school hosted Helen Sharman, the first British astronaut, who was the guest of honour and prize-giver at the school's annual Speech Day ceremony held at the Circustheatre in Scheveningen.

In 1997, Cooper was appointed an Officer of the Order of the British Empire in the New Year Honours. The award was given in recognition of his service to education and for furthering British interests in the Netherlands. He left the Netherlands in 1999 to take up his next headship in London.

=== The Latymer School (1999–2005) ===
The Latymer School, Edmonton

Cooper was appointed headteacher of The Latymer School in London in September 1999, succeeding Jackie Hardie (Acting Head) following the retirement of Geoffrey Mills . Upon his arrival, he described himself as a firm believer in the grammar school system as a means for able children from all social backgrounds to achieve their potential. His leadership saw immediate academic success, with the school recording a record 68% of A-level entries scoring Grade A or B in his first term. A survey published in 2000 indicated that under his tenure, Latymer sent more students to Oxford and Cambridge than any other state school. Managing a highly over-subscribed institution, Cooper reported that the school received 1,810 applications for 180 places in 2001, leading him to publicly counsel parents to be prepared for failure in the selection process. In February 2002, he initiated a legacy scheme alongside former heads Edward Kelly and Geoffrey Mills to encourage former students to support the school's endowment foundations.

Academic recognition continued in February 2003 when the Department for Education and Skills ranked Latymer as the top school in England for "adding value" based on pupil progress relative to their entry levels. In June 2003, Cooper launched the "Triple Five Campaign", an initiative seeking 500 donors to contribute £5 a month for five years to raise the £300,000 required to secure a £3 million government grant for a new sports hall and dining complex. He also modernised the school's technology, overseeing the June 2004 launch of the Latymer Integrated Learning Environment (LILE), which allowed students to access the school intranet from home, and installing a wireless network with mobile laptop trolleys.

His tenure culminated in a January 2005 Ofsted inspection that rated the school as "excellent with many outstanding features," specifically praising his leadership and noting that 71% of lessons were deemed "excellent" or "very good." Cooper retired as headteacher in July 2005 to pursue voluntary work abroad with VSO in Pakistan. He was succeeded by Mark Garbett. Reflecting on the school's selective status in 2012, he stated that he did not understand why people wished to "destroy something that works."

=== Post-headship and governance ===
Following his retirement from The Latymer School in July 2005, Cooper returned to Voluntary Services Overseas until 2007. This role involved educational training in Pakistan, where he and his wife, Gill, relocated to Peshawar in the North Western Frontier Province. Operating near the Khyber Pass, they were attached to the education section of the local Workers' Welfare Board, an institution funded by government taxes on industries to provide free schooling for the children of industrial workers. Cooper’s role focused on improving the administration and management of these schools, while his wife conducted teacher training. Although the board operated nine schools across the province, security risks in the surrounding tribal areas restricted the couple's onsite visits to five of the institutions. The educational framework they supported prepared students for the Pakistani leaving certificate at the end of Year 10, followed by two years of intermediate study prior to higher education, with examinations heavily oriented toward textbook-based rote learning. Their service was supported by accommodation provided by the Workers' Welfare Board and a monthly VSO living allowance of £80.

Cooper has held several roles in educational and community governance. He served as a governor for Middlesex University and Enfield College between 2003 and 2006. Following his move to Cornwall, he became a governor of Truro College and a trustee of the Citizens Advice Bureau for Cornwall in 2014. He was also a director of Callywith College.

From 17 March 2016 to 16 March 2020, he served as the Chair of the Peninsula Learning Trust in St Austell, holding the position until the trust merged with the Newquay Education Trust to form the Cornwall Education Learning Trust. He also served as a Director of the Tudor Academy Trust in Feltham from 2016 until 2025. He remains a Director for the King's Academy Trust in Portsmouth and an Honorary Vice President of the Council of British International Schools.

== Personal life ==
Cooper married Gillian Mary Isted on 23 August 1975 in Hitchin, Hertfordshire. They have two sons. Cooper is a Chartered Biologist and a Member of the Royal Society of Biology, having originally become a member of the Institute of Biology in 1971. In 1990, he was elected a Fellow of the Royal Society of Arts. He is a member of the Victory Services Club.
