= Huia Pickard =

New Zealand-born British dental surgeon and academic

Huia Masters Pickard
- Born: 25 March 1909; Masterton, New Zealand
- Died: July 17, 2002 (aged 93)
- Education: The Latymer School; Royal Dental Hospital; Charing Cross Hospital Medical School
- Known for: A Manual of Operative Dentistry
- Spouse: Daphne Evelyn Marriott (m. 1945)
- Children: 2
- Awards: BDA Tomes Medal (1983); Mentioned in Despatches (WWII)
- Scientific career
- Fields: Dentistry, Restorative dentistry
- Workplaces: Royal Dental Hospital of London

Huia Masters Pickard FDS RCS MRCS LRCP (25 March 1909 – 17 July 2002), professionally referred to as H. M. Pickard and known informally as "Pick", was a New Zealand-born British dental surgeon, medical officer, and academic. He was a pioneering figure in the formalisation of restorative dentistry as an academic discipline in the United Kingdom, serving as the Professor of Conservative Dentistry at the Royal Dental Hospital of London. He is most widely recognised as the original author of A Manual of Operative Dentistry, a foundational textbook that remained a standard global resource in dental education through ten editions over more than fifty years.

== Early life and education ==
Huia Masters Pickard was born on 25 March 1909 in Masterton, New Zealand, the son of Ernest Pickard and Sophie Elizabeth Pickard (née Robins). His family moved to England during his early childhood, settling in North London. He was educated at The Latymer School in Edmonton, where he was a distinguished student and a versatile athlete, notably winning the school's swimming championships for three consecutive years.

In 1927, Pickard began his dental studies at the Royal Dental Hospital's London School of Dental Surgery in Leicester Square. He qualified with a Licentiate in Dental Surgery in 1932. Seeking a more comprehensive clinical background, he subsequently enrolled at Charing Cross Hospital Medical School, qualifying as a medical doctor (MRCS, LRCP) with the conjoint examination in 1936.

== Military service ==
With the outbreak of the Second World War, Pickard joined the Royal Army Medical Corps in 1940. He served as a medical officer with the 8th Army in North Africa, the formation colloquially known as the "Desert Rats". During the conflict, he performed general medicine and surgical work, eventually being appointed as a trainee surgical specialist. His service was distinguished, and he was Mentioned in Despatches for his conduct during the war.

== Professional and academic career ==
Upon his demobilisation in 1945, Pickard established a professional life divided between private practice in Harley Street and clinical teaching at the Royal Dental Hospital. In 1947, he completed the Fellowship in Dental Surgery of the Royal College of Surgeons of England by examination.

In 1954, he accepted a full-time academic appointment as a lecturer at the RDH. He was promoted to Reader in 1956 and was appointed Professor of Conservative Dentistry in 1966. As head of the restorative department, he implemented a restructuring by dividing the discipline into three specialised divisions: conservative dentistry, fixed and removable prosthodontics, and complete dentures. His objective was to provide young hospital dentists with a broad training across all areas of restorative care, a pedagogical model that was later adopted by dental schools across the United Kingdom. He retired from his professorship in 1974.

=== Latymer School governance ===
Pickard maintained a lifelong commitment to his alma mater, the Latymer School. He was a founder member and long-term treasurer of the Latymer Old Students Association. In 1968, he was appointed a Foundation Governor representing the University of London.

He became Chairman of Governors in 1981. During his tenure, he oversaw the appointment of Geoffrey Mills as head teacher in 1983, an event he considered his greatest achievement for the school. However, in June 1983, Pickard was forced to relinquish the chairmanship due to the rapid progression of debilitating deafness. His colleague, Margaret Seward, described his decision to step down as a "courageous step," taken to ensure the school's governance did not suffer. He remained a governor until 1984 and continued to visit the school regularly well into his nineties.

== Research and contributions ==
Pickard's most enduring academic legacy is his textbook, A Manual of Operative Dentistry, first published by Oxford University Press in 1961. The manual was noted for its focus on clinical precision and the integration of biological principles with restorative techniques. Pickard personally authored the first five editions. In later years, the book was revised by colleagues including Edwina Kidd and Bernard Smith, and was eventually retitled Pickard's Guide to Minimally Invasive Operative Dentistry.

He was a founder member and the first president of the British Society for Restorative Dentistry, serving from 1968 to 1969. He also served as the president of the odontological section of the Royal Society of Medicine in 1971.

== Personal life ==
In 1945, Pickard married Daphne ("Daffy") Evelyn Marriott. He credited his wife's organisational skills as essential to managing his complex professional commitments. The couple had two daughters.

In retirement, Pickard lived at "The Nuttery" in Daventry, Northamptonshire, where he and his wife operated a market garden harvesting hazelnuts, snowdrops, and spring blooms. He was described by colleagues as a polymath with a profound appreciation for the works of W. B. Yeats and John Keats, as well as a lifelong passion for automobiles. He was noted for his characteristically large and bold pen handwriting. He died on 17 July 2002 at the age of 93.

== Awards and recognition ==
- Mentioned in Despatches for Second World War service.
- Fellowship in Dental Surgery, Royal College of Surgeons of England (1947).
- Tomes Medal, British Dental Association (1983), awarded for distinguished services to the dental profession.
- Honorary Membership, British Society for Restorative Dentistry.

== Selected publications ==
- Pickard, H. M. (1961). A Manual of Operative Dentistry. Oxford University Press.
- Pickard, H. M. (1966). A Manual of Operative Dentistry (2nd ed.). Oxford University Press.
- Pickard, H. M. (1970). A Manual of Operative Dentistry (3rd ed.). Oxford University Press.
- Pickard, H. M.; Kidd, E. A. M.; Smith, B. G. N. (1990). Pickard's Manual of Operative Dentistry (6th ed.). Oxford University Press.
