= Sutton High School, Plymouth =

Former grammar school in Plymouth, England

Coordinates: 50.3736°N 4.1337°W

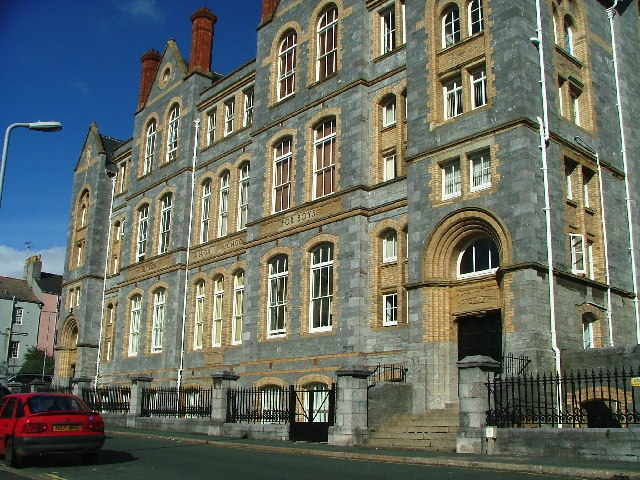
The school building in 2005, after conversion to luxury apartments

Sutton High School for Boys was a grammar school in Sutton, Plymouth, Devon, England, from 1926 to 1986. It was evacuated to St Austell, Cornwall, during World War II.

The school's building in Regent Street has been converted into flats. The school's war memorial plaques were moved to St John's Church, Plymouth.

== History ==
The school, built of Plymouth limestone, first opened in 1897 as the Regent Street Higher Grade School when pupils from Mount Street Higher Grade Board School moved into the building. The School motto was "shine to serve" and it continued until a reorganisation in 1926 when boys from Keppel Place Central School exchanged Places with the Girls in Regent Street Higher Grade School. The boys' school in Regent Street became known as Sutton Secondary School for Boys and the girls' school Stoke Damerel High School for Girls. Eventually despite the actions of the LEA the name was changed to Sutton High School for Boys.

Perhaps because of their shared history a close relationship was maintained between Sutton High and Stoke Damerel until they were both closed in 1986.

Due to the school's closeness to the naval dockyards of Plymouth, many alumni found themselves running into each other all across the world, from Gibraltar to Canada and Singapore.

== Notable alumni ==
- Graham Higman, a mathematician noted for his contributions to group theory
- Admiral Sir Nigel Stuart Henderson
- Peter Knight, arranger and musical director
- Sir Alfred John Sims (1907–77), naval architect
- Michael John Cooper OBE (1949), educator
- Lord Mayor Alderman Ken Foster (1931-2023)

== Headmasters ==
- 1926-35 Mr A L Strachan
- 1935-58 Dr C F Jones
- 1958-71 Mr H J Bristow
- 1971-84 Dr J S Rowe
- 1984-86 Dr D McCallan
