= Arthur Sanders (footballer) =

English footballer and teacher

Personal information
- Full name: Arthur Sanders
- Date of birth: 8 May 1901
- Place of birth: Edmonton, England
- Date of death: 26 September 1983 (aged 82)
- Place of death: Winchmore Hill, England
- Position: Striker

Senior career*
Years	Team	Apps	(Gls)
- London University
- Peterborough & Fletton United
- Northfleet United
1926–1927	Tottenham Hotspur	13	(7)
- Northfleet United
1929–1932	Clapton Orient	53	(5)
- * Club domestic league appearances and goals

Arthur Sanders (8 May 1901 – 26 September 1983) was an English teacher and professional footballer who played for London University, Peterborough & Fletton United, Northfleet United, Tottenham Hotspur and Clapton Orient.

== Early life ==
Sanders was educated at Raynham Road school and the Latymer School in Edmonton and played football for both schools. At the end of World War I he joined the Mercantile and Marine. During a visit to Argentina he found time to turn out for local club Rosario Central.

== Football career ==
Sanders played for the London University before joining Peterborough & Fletton United where he was a member of the side which won the Southern Football League title in 1923–24. Sanders a talented striker joined Tottenham Hotspur as an amateur in December 1923. He went on to play for club's "nursery" team Northfleet United. Sanders returned to Tottenham and made his debut for the Lilywhites in February 1927. He went on to make 13 appearances and score seven goals for the North London club. Sanders re-joined Northfleet and stayed a further four years at the Kent club. In 1929 he signed for Clapton Orient and found the net on six occasions in 56 matches in all competitions between 1929 and 1932. Sanders retired from professional football in 1933.

== Post-footballing career ==
Sanders trained at the London University to become a teacher. In his first spell at Northfleet United he also taught at the Silver Street school in Edmonton. After retiring from competitive football in 1933 he returned to teaching and took up a post at the Raglan school in the Bush Hill Park area of Enfield and later became headmaster until the 1960s. He later acted as an administrator for the Edmonton and District football association.

== Death ==
Sanders died on 26 September 1983 at Winchmore Hill.
