= Joseph Acton Morris =

English geographer and school teacher (1901–1987)

- Born: May 28, 1901; Leigh, Lancashire, England
- Died: October 1987; Ware, Hertfordshire, England
- Other name: Jammy
- Education: University of London
- Occupations: Geographer; School teacher; Author; Deputy Headmaster
- Known for: Advocacy of geographical fieldwork; President of the Geographical Association (1965); Sketch-map Histories series

Joseph Acton Morris (28 May 1901 – October 1987), was an English geographer and school teacher. He was a significant advocate for geographical fieldwork, served as president of the Geographical Association in 1965, and authored or co-authored approximately fifteen textbooks in history and geography, including the Sketch-map Histories series with Irene Richards. He taught at The Latymer School, Edmonton, for 36 years, eventually becoming Deputy Head, and wrote a comprehensive history of the school published in 1975.

== Early life and family ==
Joseph Acton Morris was born in Leigh, Lancashire, on 28 May 1901 to Joseph Morris, a joiner, and his wife Emma. He had an older brother named Samuel who was a Spindle Worker, a sister named Irene who was a primary school teacher, and a younger brother named Frank. Raised in Leigh, he initially worked as a Railway Goods Clerk for the London and North Western Railway before pursuing higher education. He earned a Bachelor of Science degree in Economics from the University of London. Morris later married and had a son, Peter, who became Dr. Peter Morris.

== Career ==
The Latymer School, Edmonton.

Morris joined The Latymer School, Edmonton, in the summer of 1926, when an economics course was added to the sixth form curriculum. He was recruited by the then headmaster Richard Ashworth, a fellow Lancastrian. Morris primarily taught geography, demonstrating a keen interest in topics such as the Lancashire cotton industry and the Indian monsoon.

In 1931, V. S. E. Davis appointed him head of the geography department. A strong believer in the Wordsworthian concept of the beneficent influence of close contact with nature, he was a pioneer of field work in geographical study. He read a paper on this subject to the Congrès Internationale de Géographie at Warsaw in 1934. Under his guidance, Dr. Dyer's Caterham round was extended, and The Latymer Geographical Society arranged Saturday walks in the North Downs and the Chilterns. He organised summer camps and walking tours for boys across the British Isles and the Alps, and specialised field work for sixth-formers was undertaken at centres in the Pennines and in North and South Wales. The preface to his school history notes his enthusiasm for such activities, stating how he "would have welcomed Ysgol Latymer," the school's later-established field studies centre.

Morris was appointed Deputy Headmaster in 1952. After 36 years of service at Latymer, he retired in 1962 and moved to Ware in Hertfordshire.

=== Geographical Association ===
In 1965, Morris was chosen as President of the Geographical Association, a rare distinction for a practising schoolmaster. His appointment was well received by secondary school teachers within the association. In his presidential address, he advocated for increased resources for teaching geography in schools and emphasised the importance of practical field trips, aiming for children to understand that "geography is reality and reality geography," as his obituary in Geography noted.

== Publications ==
Morris authored or co-authored approximately fifteen textbooks in history and geography, often collaborating with former colleagues and ex-pupils.

His A History of The Latymer School at Edmonton, published by the Governors of the Latymer Foundation in 1975, is a notable work. The book details the school's history from Elizabethan times, drawing on research from episcopal and state papers due to a scarcity of original school records. It sets the school's story against the backdrop of the changing needs of the local community and illustrates main trends in English education. The work reveals nineteenth-century conflicts between those prioritising free clothing and those advocating for education, as well as late-century struggles between factions supporting secondary education for clever boys, regardless of poverty, and an ecclesiastical faction favouring Latymer-endowed primary schooling. The book also addresses issues of corruption and inefficient management of charity funds by Trustees, and the urgent need for educational improvement driven by the rapid population growth that turned the Lower Lea valley into an industrial slum.

With Irene Richards, and George Taylor as general editor, Morris prepared the Sketch-map Histories series, which was published in multiple volumes and editions from the 1930s to the 1970s. This series combined historical maps with explanatory text. Their A Sketch-Map History of the Great War and after, 1914-1935 was noted in a 1938 review for its attempts at impartiality, although the reviewer considered it generous towards some belligerents. The final volume in the series, A Junior Sketch-Map Economic History of Britain, faced criticism in a 1962 review for being derived from outdated elementary textbooks and for a perceived lack of awareness regarding developments in the field of economic history in the 35 years prior to its publication.

=== Selected publications ===
- A contour dictionary. A short text-book on contour reading with map exercises. George G. Harrap & Co., London, 1945. (multiple later editions)
- The land from the air: A photographic geography. George G. Harrap & Co., London, 1958. (With G.H. Dury)
- The British Isles in map and diagram. Thomas Nelson & Sons, London, 1966. (With Dick Gerald Luxon)
- Landscape and mapcraft: From field study to map. Collins Clear-Type Press, London and Glasgow, 1968.
- London and the London region. Thomas Nelson & Sons, 1968. (Nelsons Geography Studies)
- The growth of industrial Britain, 1700 to the present day. A work-book and study guide in social and economic history, arranged by J. A. Morris. George G. Harrap & Co., London, 1971.
- Northwestern Europe: A systematic approach. Nelson, London, 1973.
- A History of The Latymer School at Edmonton. Governors of the Latymer Foundation, Edmonton, 1975.

==== Sketch-map Histories ====
Selected titles. Most volumes exist in multiple editions with different subtitles:

- A sketch-map history of Britain, 1783-1914. G.G. Harrap & Co., London, 1937. (No. 2) (With Irene Richards)
- A sketch-map history of the Great War and after, 1914-35. G.G. Harrap & Co., London, 1938. (No. 3) (With Irene Richards and Jack Bezar Goodson)
- A sketch-map history of Britain, 1688-1914. G.G. Harrap & Co., London, 1940. (No. 5) (With Irene Richards & George Robert Stirling Taylor)
- A sketch-map history of Britain and Europe to 1485. G.G. Harrap & Co., London, 1946. (No. 6) (With Irene Richards)
- A sketch-map economic history of Britain. G.G. Harrap & Co., London, 1957. (No. 6) (With Irene Richards and Joshua Leonard Gayler)
- A junior sketch-map economic history of Britain. G.G. Harrap & Co., London, 1961. (With Irene Richards)

== Death and legacy ==
Joseph Morris died in Ware, Hertfordshire in October 1987, aged 86. He was survived by his son, Dr. Peter Morris.

Morris's 36-year tenure at The Latymer School left a significant mark, where he was known as "Jammy" to generations of students. His work in geographical fieldwork and his influential presidency of the Geographical Association as a schoolmaster highlighted his contributions to education.

== Bibliography ==
- Morris, Joseph Acton (1975). A History of The Latymer School at Edmonton. The Latymer Foundation at Edmonton. ISBN 978-0-9504862-0-8.
