= Dietary biology of the Nile crocodile =

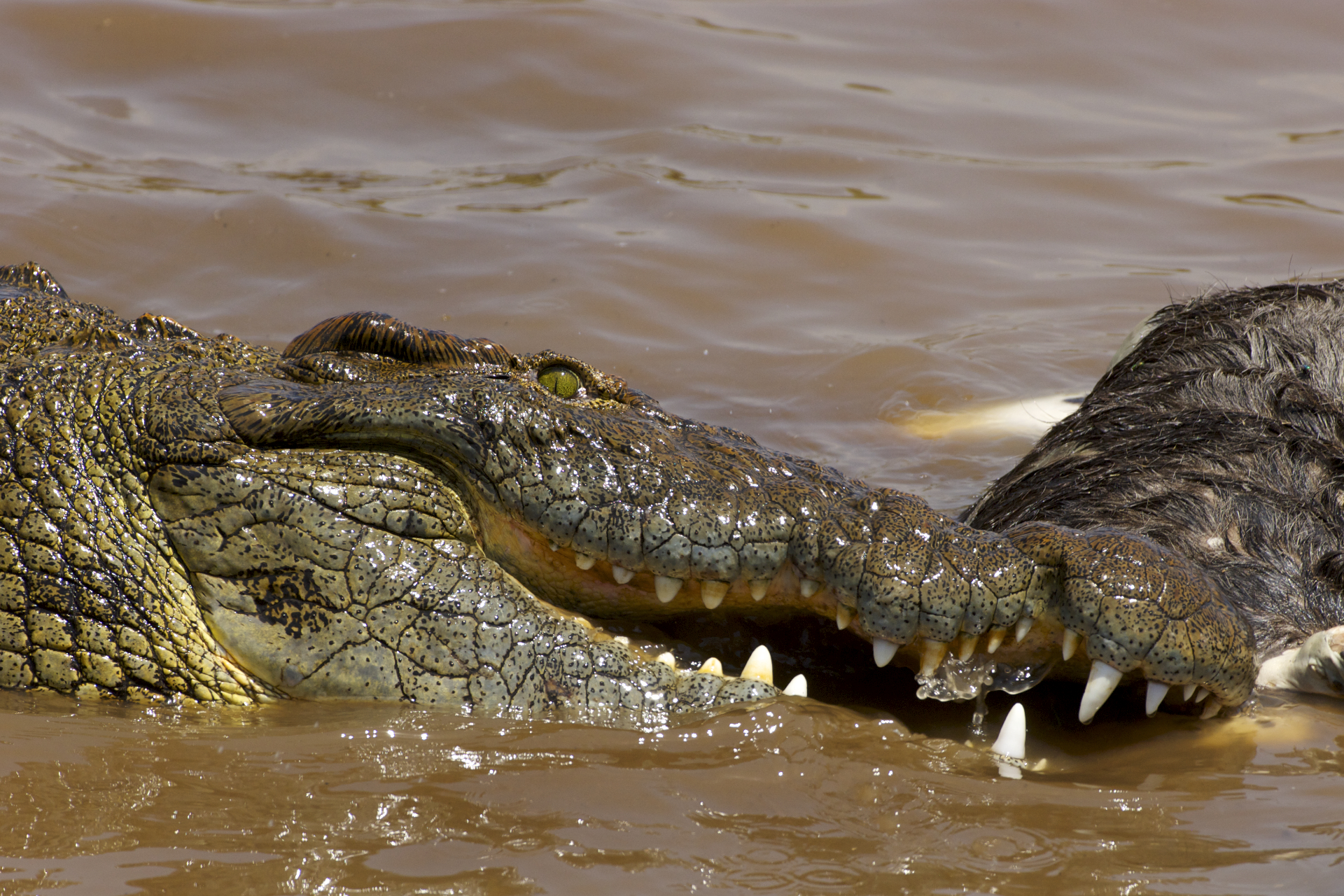
Feeding on a dead wildebeest in the Masai Mara

Nile crocodiles are apex predators throughout their range. In the water, this species is an agile and rapid hunter relying on both movement and pressure sensors to catch any prey that presents itself inside or near the waterfront. Out of the water, however, the Nile crocodile can only rely on its limbs, as it gallops on solid ground, to chase prey. No matter where they attack prey, this and other crocodilians take practically all of their food by ambush, needing to grab their prey in a matter of seconds to succeed. They have an ectothermic metabolism, so can survive for long periods between meals—though when they do eat, they can eat up to half their body weight at a time. However, for such large animals, their stomachs are relatively small, not much larger than a basketball in an average-sized adult, so as a rule, they are anything but voracious eaters.

Young crocodiles feed more actively than their elders according to studies in Uganda and Zambia. In general, at the smallest sizes (0.3–1 m (1 ft 0 in – 3 ft 3 in)), Nile crocodiles were most likely to have full stomachs (17.4% full per Cott); adults at 3–4 m (9 ft 10 in – 13 ft 1 in) in length were most likely to have empty stomachs (20.2%). In the largest size range studied by Cott, 4–5 m (13 ft 1 in – 16 ft 5 in), they were the second most likely to either have full stomachs (10%) or empty stomachs (20%). Other studies have also shown a large number of adult Nile crocodiles with empty stomachs. For example, in Lake Turkana, Kenya, 48.4% of crocodiles had empty stomachs. The stomachs of brooding females are always empty, meaning that they can survive several months without food.

== Invertebrates ==
The type and size of the prey depends mostly on the size of the crocodile. The diet of young crocodiles is made up largely of insects and other invertebrates, since this is the only prey the same animals can easily take. More than 100 species and genera of insects were identified among the food of crocodiles of this age. Of the insects taken there, beetles made up 58% of the diet, including Hydrophilus and Cybister. Giant water bugs but also crickets and dragonflies. Arachnids such as Dolomedes water spiders are taken, but always secondarily to insects in Uganda and Zambia.

Crabs are also largely taken by crocodiles under 1.5 m (4 ft 11 in), especially the genus Potamonautes, with different species being the primary crustacean food in different areas. Mollusks may occasionally be taken by young crocodiles (they are taken in larger numbers later in life in parts of Uganda and Zambia). In the Okavango Delta, Botswana, the diet was similar but young crocodiles ate a broader range of insects and invertebrates, with beetles taken in similar numbers to other, similar prey, both aquatic and terrestrial. In Botswana, arachnids were more often found in young crocodiles than in Uganda and Zambia. In Zimbabwe, the dietary composition was broadly similar to that in other areas. However, in the Ugandan portion of Lake Victoria, true bugs and dragonflies both seem to outnumber beetles notably and up to a length of 1 to 2 m (3 ft 3 in to 6 ft 7 in) crocodiles had stomach contents that were made up 70–75% of insects.

After Nile crocodiles reach 2 m (6 ft 7 in), the significance of most invertebrates in the diet decreases precipitously. An exception to this is in Uganda and Zambia, where subadults and adults of even large sizes, up to 3.84 m (12 ft 7 in), may eat very large numbers of snails. Nearly 70% of the crocodiles examined by Cott (1961) had some remains of snails inside their stomachs. Predation on amuplariid water snails was especially heavy in Bangweulu Swamp, Lake Mweru Wantipa, and the Kafue Flats, where mollusks representing 89.1, 87, and 84.7% of all prey in these locations, respectively. Gastropoda (4126 records per Cott) were taken much more than Lamellibranchiata (six records). Notable favorites include Pila ovata, which lives just under water on rocky surfaces (mainly found in crocodiles from Uganda) and Lanistes ovum, which is found submerged among water plants and on detritus (mainly from stomachs in Zambia).

== Fish ==
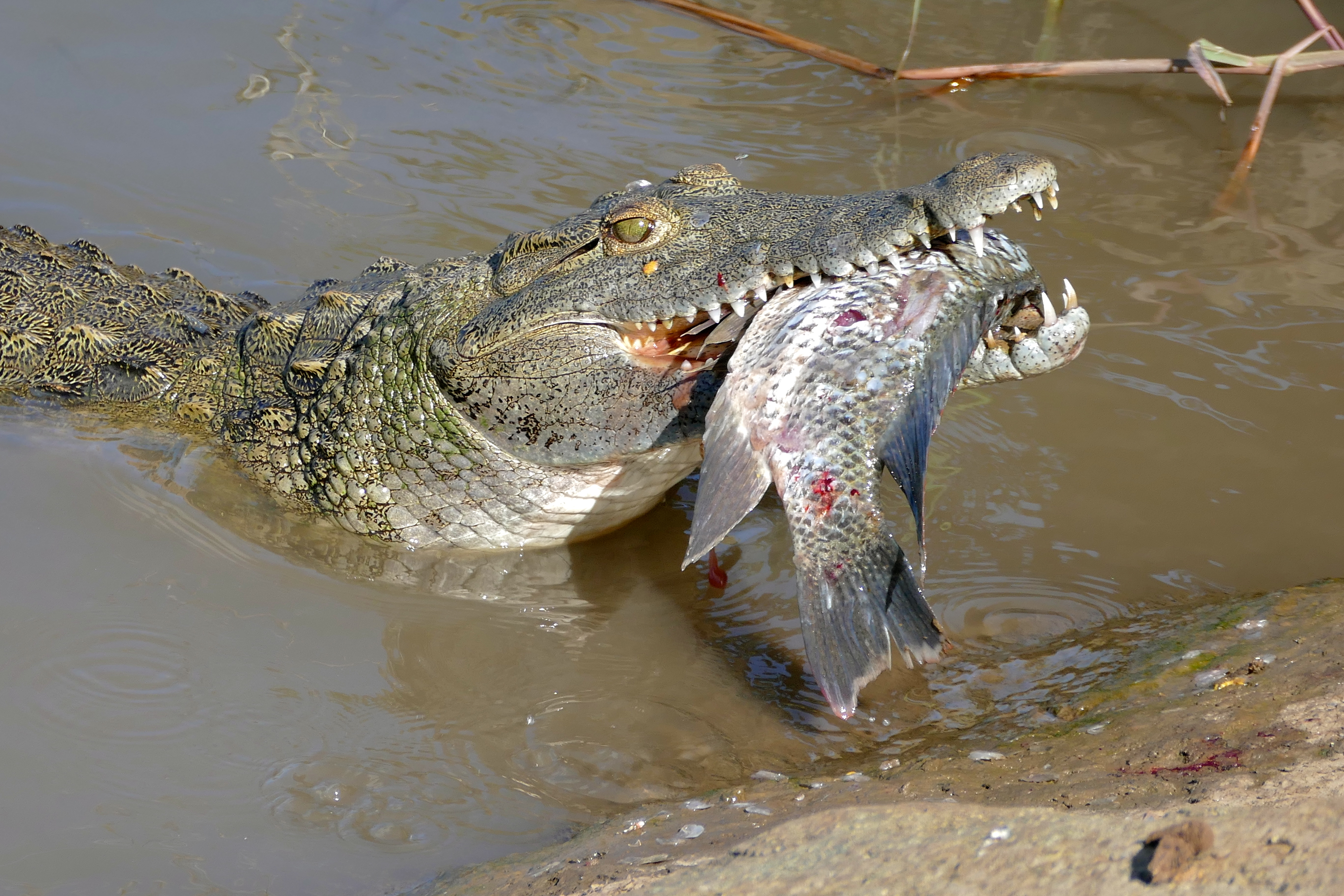
Subadult with tilapia as its prey

During the time from when they are roughly 1.5 to 2.2 m (4 ft 11 in to 7 ft 3 in) long (roughly 5 to 9 years old), Nile crocodiles seem to have the broadest diet of any age range. They take more or less much the same small prey as smaller crocodiles, including insects and arachnids, but also take many small to medium-sized vertebrates and quickly become capable taking down prey up to their own weight. Fish become especially significant around this age and size. However, Cott (1961) found that the only size range where fish were numerically dominant over other types of food was from 2 to 3.05 m (6 ft 7 in to 10 ft 0 in). This size range consists of subadult males and a mixture of subadult and adult females. In Lake Turkana, fish were the only food in the stomachs of 45.4% of the crocodiles that did not have empty stomachs, in total 87.8% of the crocodiles that did not have empty stomachs there had fish in their stomachs. Graham (1968) noted that throughout East Africa, crocodile diets are driven by the regional availability of prey. The arid land surrounding Lake Turkana is a relatively barren region for diverse or numerous prey other than fish, so fish are an exceptionally important food source to crocodiles there. In Lake Kyoga and Lake Kwana, 73.1% of the crocodiles that did not have empty stomachs had fish in their stomachs. At Lake St. Lucia in South Africa, many Nile crocodile congregate to feed on striped mullet (Mugil cephalus) as they make their seaward migration for spawning. Here, the crocodiles may line up in dozens across narrow straits of the estuary to effectively force the mullet into easy striking distance, with no observed in-fighting among these crocodile feeding congregations. At this time of plenty (before irrigation operations by humans led St. Lucia to have dangerously high saline levels), a 2.5 m (8 ft 2 in) crocodile could expect to eat 1.1 kg (2.4 lb) of mullet daily, an exceptionally large daily amount for a crocodile.

Larger fish, like catfish and freshwater bass, are preferred by adults more than 2.2 m (7 ft 3 in) in length. Particularly small fish are likely to be eaten only in case of sudden encounter, mostly in shallow, dry-season ponds where not much effort is needed to catch the small, agile prey. Most observed fishing by crocodiles takes place in waters less than 1.5 m (4 ft 11 in) deep and fish are often caught when they swim into contact with the crocodile's head, even literally right into the reptile's mouth. Across much of their range, they take any fish they encounter, but largish and relatively sluggish mesopredator fish such as lungfish and Barbus carp seem to be most widely reported. Many other genera are taken widely and relatively regularly, including Tilapia (which was the most significant prey genus in Lake Turkana), Clarias, Haplochromis, and Mormyrus. In Uganda and Zambia, lungfish comprised nearly two-thirds of the piscivorian diet for crocodiles. Similarly, in Lake Baringo, the lungfish is the crocodile's main prey and the crocodile is the lungfish's primary predator. In the Okavango Delta, the African pikes (Hepsetus spp.) were the leading prey group for subadults, comprising more than a fourth of the diet. Extremely large fish, such as Nile perch (Lates niloticus), goliath tigerfish (Hydrocynus goliath), and even sharks, are taken on occasion, in addition to big catfish, such as Bagrus spp. and Clarias gariepinus, which are preyed upon quite regularly in areas where they are common. In the Zambezi River and Lake St. Lucia, Nile crocodiles have been known to prey on bull sharks (Carcharhinus leucas) and sand tiger sharks (Carcharias taurus). The largest fishes attacked in such cases may potentially weigh more than 45 kg (99 lb).

When capturing large fish, they often drag the fish onto shore and swing their heads around to smash the fish onto the ground until it is dead or incapacitated. More modestly sized fish are generally swallowed whole. The Nile crocodile has a reputation as a voracious and destructive feeder on freshwater fish, many of which are essential to the livelihoods of local fisherman and the industry of sport fishing. However, this is very much an unearned reputation. As cold-blooded creatures, Nile crocodiles need to eat far less compared to an equivalent-weighted warm-blooded animal. The crocodile of 2 to 3.05 m (6 ft 7 in to 10 ft 0 in) consumes an average 286 g (10.1 oz) of fish per day. In comparison, piscivorous water birds from Africa eat far more per day despite being a fraction of the body size of a crocodile; for example, a cormorant eats up to 1.4 kg (3.1 lb) per day (about 70% of its own body weight), while a pelican consumes up to 3.1 kg (6.8 lb) per day (about 35% of its own weight). The taking of commercially important fish, such as Tilapia, has been mentioned as a source of conflict between humans and crocodiles, and used as justification for crocodile-culling operations; however, even a primarily piscivorous crocodile needs relatively so little fish that it cannot deplete fish populations on its own without other (often anthropogenic) influences. Additionally, crocodiles readily take dead or dying fish given the opportunity, thus are likely to incidentally improve the health of some fish species' populations as this lessens their exposure to diseases and infection.

== Reptiles and amphibians ==
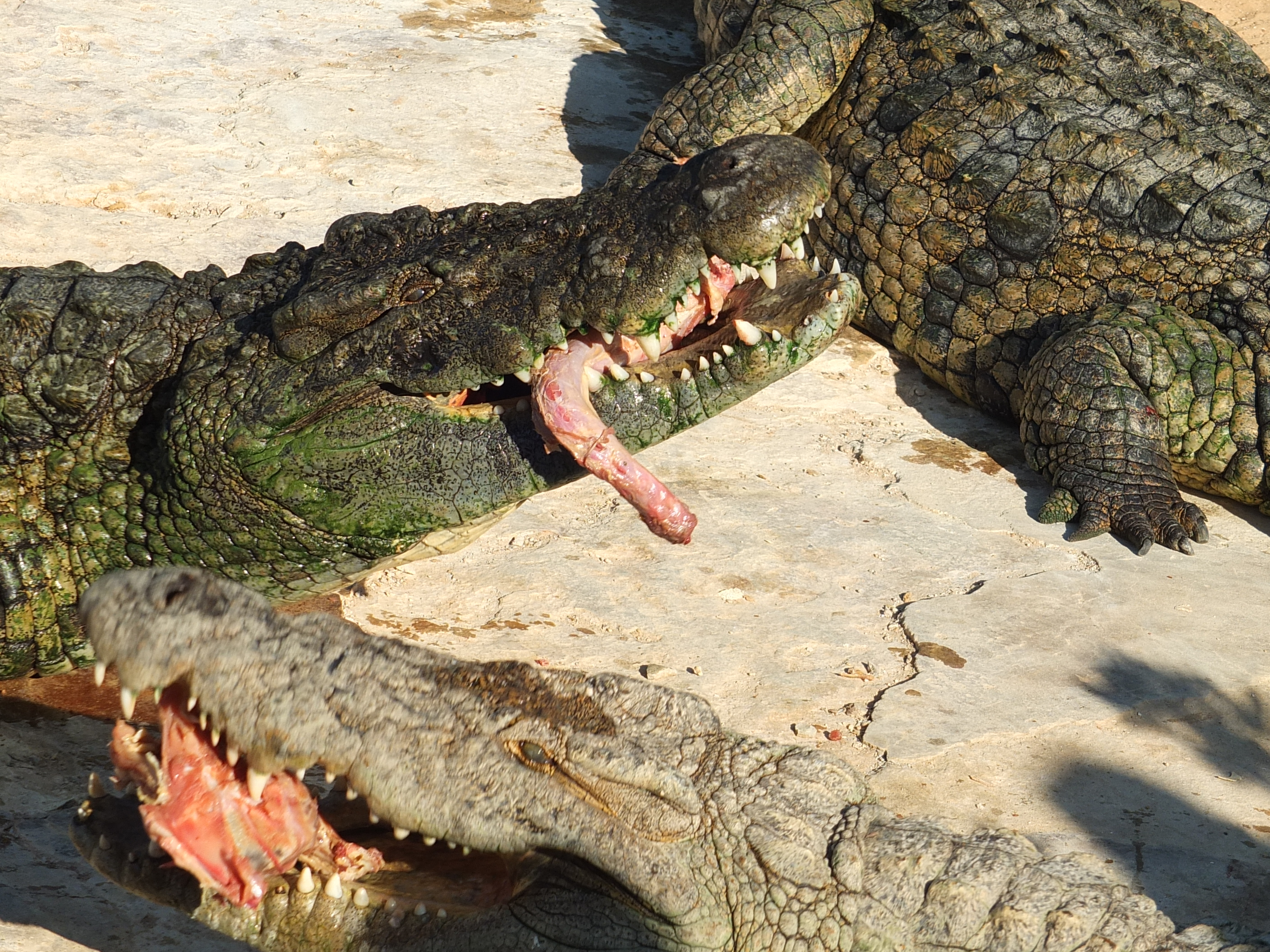
Captive adult Nile crocodiles feeding

Frogs are regionally significant prey for small, young crocodiles in many regions, mainly those in the 0.5 to 1.5 m (1 ft 8 in to 4 ft 11 in) size range. The main amphibian prey species from Uganda and Zambia was the African common toad (Amietophrynus regularis) while in Botswana, the main amphibian prey was the reed frog (Hyperolius viridiflavus). Even the largest frog in the world, the goliath frog (Conraua goliath), has reportedly been preyed on by young Nile crocodiles.

In general, reptiles become relatively common only in the diet in larger juvenile specimens and subadults. Large reptiles, or armoured reptiles such as turtles, were almost negligible in crocodiles under 2.5 m (8 ft 2 in) and most common in the stomachs of crocodiles over 3.5 m (11 ft 6 in) in length from Uganda and Zambia. Small species of reptiles are largely ignored as prey at this size. Freshwater turtles are often the most frequently recorded reptilian prey, unsurprisingly perhaps because most other reptiles other than a small handful of Lycodonomorphus water snakes are more terrestrial than water-based.

In a study, the serrated hinged terrapin (Pelusios sinuatus) (also sometimes referred to as the "water tortoise") was more commonly reported in the stomach contents of adult crocodiles from Kruger National Park than any single mammal species. Other turtle species commonly recorded among Nile crocodile prey include the Speke's hinge-back tortoise (Kinixys spekii) and East African black mud turtle (Pelusios subniger). Beyond their ready availability and respectable size, turtles are favored by big crocodiles due to their slowness, which allows the cumbersome crocodiles to capture them more easily than swifter vertebrates. While adults have a sufficient bite force to crush turtle shells, younger crocodiles sometimes are overly ambitious, and will choke to death attempting to swallow whole large river turtles. A variety of snakes has been preyed on from relatively small, innocuous species such as the common egg-eating snake (Dasypeltis scabra) to the largest African snakes species, the Southern African rock python (Python natalensis) and the Central African rock python (Python sebae), which can exceed 6.1 m (20 ft 0 in) in length and weigh over 91 kg (201 lb). Venomous species, including the puff adder (Bitis arietans), the forest cobra (Naja melanoleuca), and the black mamba (Dendroaspis polylepis) have been recorded as Nile crocodile prey. The only frequently recorded lizard prey is the large Nile monitor (Varanus niloticus), although this mesopredator may be eaten fairly regularly, as they often share similar habitat preferences, whenever a crocodile is able to ambush the stealthy monitor, which is more agile on land than the bulkier crocodile.

== Birds ==
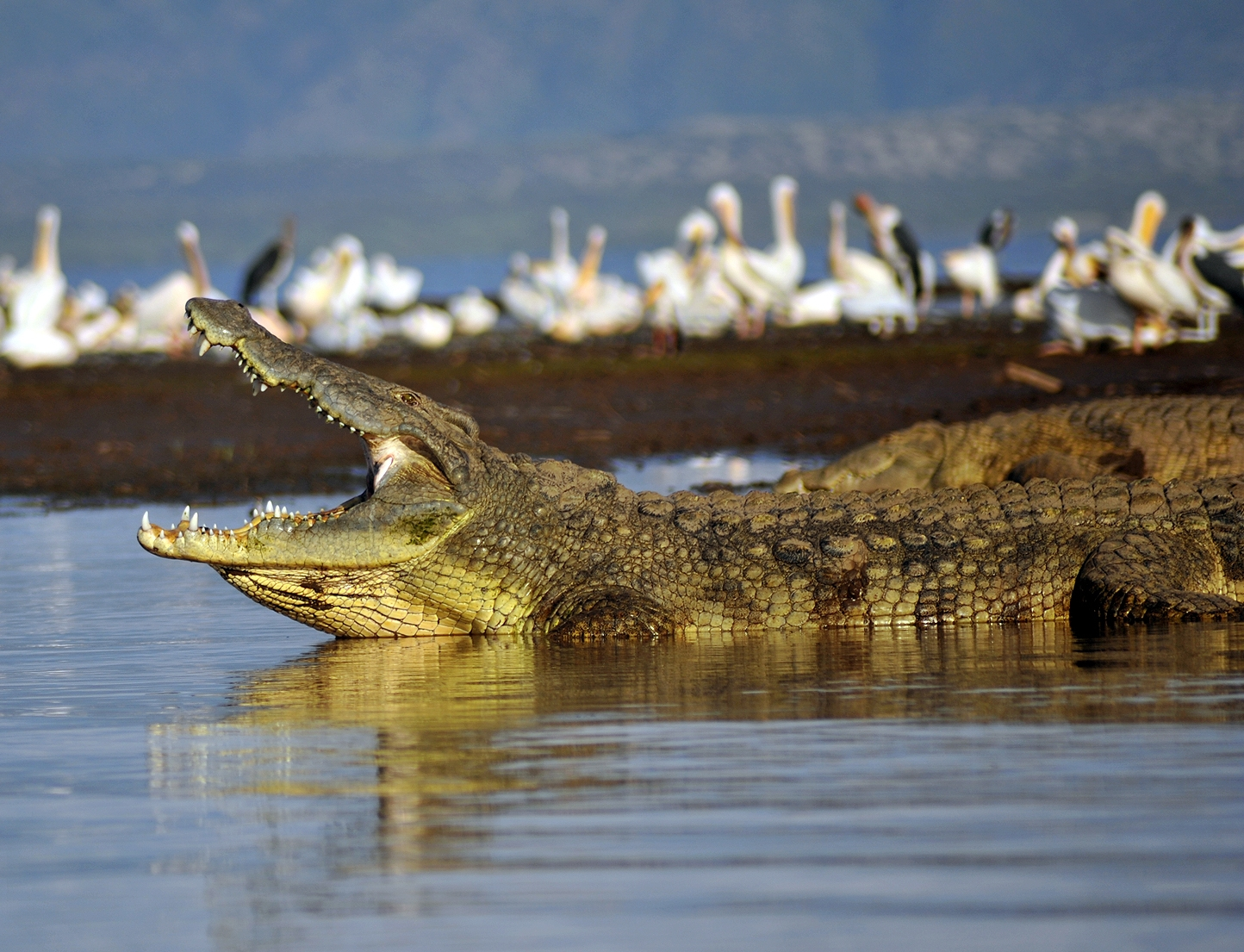
Pelicans have little to fear from crocodiles on land, but they can be vulnerable while swimming to crocodiles lurking under water.

Numerous birds, including storks, small wading birds, waterfowl, eagles, and even small, swift-flying birds, may be snatched. As a whole, birds are quite secondary prey, rarely comprising more than 10–15% of crocodiles' diets, although are taken fairly evenly across all crocodile size ranges, excluding juveniles less than 1 m (3 ft 3 in). Birds most often taken are African darters (Anhinga rufa) and reed (Microcarbo africanus) and white-breasted cormorants (Phalacrocorax lucidus), followed by various waterfowl, including most breeding geese and ducks in Africa. Slow-swimming pelicans are also vulnerable to crocodiles. Nile crocodiles apparently frequently station themselves underneath breeding colonies of darters, cormorants, herons, egrets, and stork and presumably snatch up fledgling birds as they drop to the water before they can competently escape the saurian, as has been recorded with several other crocodilians.

Wading birds, even large and relatively slow-moving types such as the goliath heron (Ardea goliath), tend to be highly cautious in avoiding deep water in crocodile-occupied wetlands, whereas cormorants and waterfowl forage over deeper water and are easier for crocodiles to ambush, with Egyptian geese (Alopochen aegyptiaca) and spur-winged geese (Plectropterus gambensis) recorded as being taken largely while flightless due to molting their flight feathers. In one case, a crocodile was filmed capturing a striated heron (Butorides striata) in mid-flight. Ospreys (Pandion haliaetus) are known to be grabbed while they dive for fish as are possibly African fish eagles (Haliaeetus vocifer), while crowned eagles (Stephanoaetus coronatus) have reportedly been ambushed on land at carrion. Crocodiles are occasionally successful in grabbing passerines such as weaver birds, including the abundant red-billed quelea (Quelea quelea), and swallows, having been observed to breach the water and in a matter of seconds sweep off a branch full of birds with remarkable success. Larger land birds, such as bustards, guineafowl, ground hornbills (Bucorvus spp.) and ostriches (Struthio camelus), may be taken when they come to water to drink, but like most birds, are seldom harassed and a minor part of the diet.

== Mammals ==
Determining the percentage of any specific food item in a crocodile's diet is difficult because their defecation in water makes scat analysis impossible, and capturing individual animals to analyze their stomach contents is painstaking. In addition, as an animal that feeds rarely, sometimes only a few times in a year, even the individual stomach content examinations sometimes prove to be unsuccessful. However, as crocodiles grow, relying solely on small and agile food items such as fish becomes difficult, this causes a shift in the diet as the animal matures, for energy conservation purposes, as in other predators. Nonetheless, starting around 1.5 m (4 ft 11 in), they can become capable mammalian hunters and their ability to overpower a wide range of mammals increases along with their size. Crocodiles less than 3 m (9 ft 10 in) may take a variety of medium–sized mammals up to equal their own mass, including various monkeys, duikers, rodents, hares, pangolins, bats, dik-dik, suni (Neotragus moschatus), oribi (Ourebia ourebi) and other small ungulates up to the size of a Thomson's gazelle (Eudorcas thomsonii).

Rodents and shrews may enter the diet of juvenile crocodiles, i.e. 1.0 to 1.5 m (3 ft 3 in to 4 ft 11 in), and become commonplace in subadult and small adult crocodiles. Species recorded include the Natal multimammate mouse (Mastomys natalensis), African marsh rat (Dasymys incomtus), common rufous-nosed rat (Oenomys hypoxanthus), and savanna swamp shrew (Crocidura longipes). In many areas, the cane rats are a particular favorite mammalian food for crocodiles, particularly the relatively large greater cane rat (Thryonomys swinderianus). In Uganda and Zambia, the latter species are the leading overall mammalian prey type for crocodiles and one Kenyan crocodile of 2.7 m (8 ft 10 in) in length had 40 greater cane rats in its stomach. Cape porcupines (Hystrix africaeaustralis) are known to have been preyed on several times in Kruger National Park, their quills apparently being an insufficient defense against the tough jaws and digestive systems of crocodiles. Small carnivores are readily taken opportunistically, including both African clawless otters (Aonyx capensis) and spotted-necked otters (Hydrictis maculicollis), as well as water mongoose (Atilax paludinosus), African wildcats (Felis lybica) and servals (Leptailurus serval).

Adult Nile crocodiles, i.e. at least 3.05 m (10 ft 0 in), are apex predators. While adults can and will consume nearly all types of prey consumed by the younger specimens, as adult crocodiles gain bulk, they lose much of the necessary maneuverability to capture agile prey such as fish and are not likely to meet their dietary needs by consuming small prey and may expel unnecessary amounts of energy, so take them secondarily to larger prey. Primates of various sizes may be taken by subadult or adult crocodiles. In some areas, some number of baboons are taken, such as in Okavango Delta, where chacma baboons (Papio ursinus) are eaten and Uganda, where olive baboons (Papio anubis) are taken. Few details are known about the dietary habits of Nile crocodiles living in Madagascar, although they are considered potential predators of several lemur species. Other nonungulate prey known to be attacked by Nile crocodiles includes aardvarks (Orycteropus afer) and African manatees (Trichechus senegalensis).

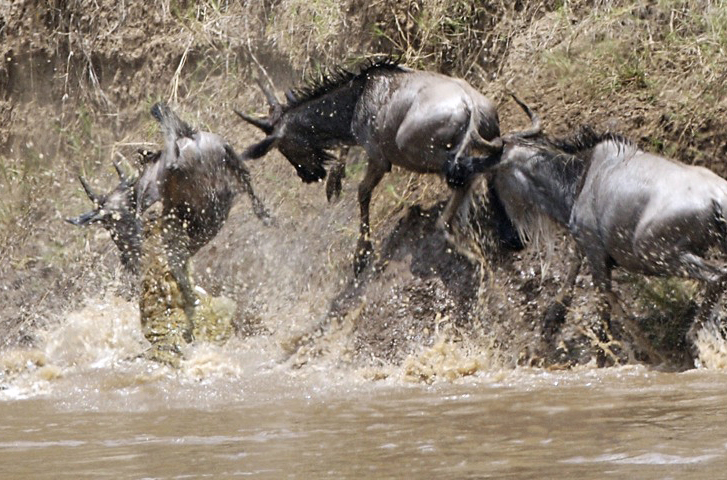
Wildebeest crossing the Mara River, attacked by crocodiles

Among the mammals, the bulk of the prey for adults are antelope. In particular, the genus Kobus is often among the most vulnerable because it forages primarily in wetland areas and seeks to evade more prolific mammalian predators (such as hyenas, lions, etc.) by traveling along waterways. In some cases in Kruger National Park, antelope have been driven into water while being pursued by packs of African wild dogs (Lycaon pictus), which hunt by endurance, engaging prey in a grueling chase until it is exhausted (a very successful hunting style), only to be killed by opportunistic crocodiles. While not as extensively aquatic as the genus Kobus, the reedbucks and the impala (Aepyceros melampus) have both shown a partiality for grasslands adjoining wetlands and riparian zones, so are also very commonly recorded prey items. In Kruger National Park, over the course of 22 years of discontinuous observation, 60% of the large-game kills observed as perpetrated by crocodiles consisted of impala, while more than 15% of observed kills were made up of waterbuck (Kobus ellipsiprymnus), the largest of the genus Kobus at more than 200 kg (440 lb) in weight. Elsewhere, the waterbuck appears to be the most significant mammalian prey for large adult crocodiles, such as in Uganda and Zambia (although due to more sporadic general ungulate populations in those countries, ungulates are less common as prey than in some other countries), as well as in Hluhluwe–iMfolozi Park, South Africa. Other antelopes recorded as prey including gazelles, bushbuck (Tragelaphus scriptus), sitatunga (Tragelaphus spekii), kudu (Tragelaphus strepsiceros), steenbok (Raphicerus campestris), eland (Taurotragus oryx), gemsbok (Oryx gazella), sable (Hippotragus niger) and roan antelopes (Hippotragus equinus), up to a half dozen types of duiker, topi (Damaliscus lunatus), hartebeest (Alcelaphus buselaphus) and both species of wildebeest (Connochaetes sp.).

Other ungulates are taken by Nile crocodile more or less opportunistically. These may include Grévy's (Equus grevyi) and plains zebras (Equus quagga), warthogs (Phacochoerus africanus), bushpigs (Potamochoerus larvatus) and red river hogs (Potamochoerus porcus). In Maasai Mara, Tanzania, large crocodiles congregate at river crossings used by migrating herds of Burchell's zebras and blue wildebeests (Connochaetes taurinus), picking off hundreds of these large ungulates annually. All domesticated ungulates and pet animals will on occasion be hunted by Nile crocodiles, up to the size of dromedary camels (Camelus dromedarius) and cattle (Bos taurus) In Tanzania, up to 54 head of cattle may be lost to crocodiles annually, increasing the human-crocodile conflict level. Goats (Capra hircus), donkeys (Equus asinus) and dogs (Canis familiaris) may also rank among the most regularly recorded domesticated animals to be taken by Nile crocodiles.

Particularly large adults, on occasion, take on even larger prey, such as giraffe (Giraffa sp.), Cape buffalo (Syncerus caffer), and young African bush elephants (Loxodonta africana). Even heavier prey, such as black rhinoceros (Diceros bicornis), have been killed by crocodiles. In one case in the Tana River of Kenya, as observed by Max Fleishmann (communicated via letter to Theodore Roosevelt), a Nile crocodile was able to bring down one of these huge herbivores by the help of muddy bank terrain, the adult female rhino's poor decision to enter deeper water rather than retreat to land and finally having been joined in drowning the animal by one to two other crocodiles. An additional case of predation on an adult black rhino was reportedly observed in northern Zambia. A bull giraffe that lost his footing on a river bank in Kruger National Park was seen to be killed by a large crocodile, while in another case there, a healthy bull buffalo was seen to be overpowered and killed by an average-sized adult male crocodile measuring 4.25 m (13 ft 11 in) after a massive struggle, an incident less commonly seen at this size. Since crocodiles are solitary hunters, the Nile crocodile is the only predator in Africa known to attack full-grown Cape buffaloes alone, compared to the preferred pride attack method of lions.

Although Nile crocodiles occasionally prey on hippopotamus calves, even large adult crocodiles rarely attack them because of the aggressive defense by mother hippos and the close protection of the herd, which pose a serious threat. Hippo calves have been observed to at times act brazenly around crocodiles, foraging without apparent concern and even bumping into the reptiles. However, some large Nile crocodiles have been recorded as predators of subadult hippos; anecdotally, the infamous giant crocodile Gustave was reported to have been seen killing adult female hippos. A 5 m (16 ft 5 in) specimen from Zambia was found to have eaten a "half-grown hippo". At the no-longer-existent Ripon Falls in Uganda, one adult bull hippo was seen to be badly injured in a mating battle with a rival bull hippo, and was then subsequently attacked by several crocodiles, causing it to retreat to a reedbed. When the male hippo returned to the water, it was drowned and killed by the group of Nile crocodiles amid "a truly terrifying commotion". However, other than rare instances, adults of megafauna species such as hippopotamuses, rhinoceroses, and elephants are not regular prey and are not typically attacked, with the exception of giraffes, since their anatomy makes them vulnerable to attack while taking a drink.

Nile crocodiles occasionally prey on big cats including lions and leopards. However, in order to save energy, crocodiles do not prefer such agile animals, as most attacks will end before they can strike. Thus they usually attack agile prey in the absence of regular prey items. Other large carnivores that dwell in Africa near the top of the food chain can also on occasion fall prey to crocodiles. Such predators that can find themselves victim to crocodiles include hyenas (3 out of 4 species reported as prey for Nile crocodiles, only the desert-dwelling brown (Parahyaena brunnea) being excluded), African wild dogs, jackals, and cheetahs (Acinonyx jubatus).

== Vegetation ==
In the Nile crocodile as well as in at least 13 other species of crocodilian, a variety of fruit (mostly fleshy) has been found in stomach content. While these are probably sometimes used as gastroliths, they are likely often ingested for their nutritional value. Based on these findings, it has also been suggested that crocodiles may act as seed dispersers.
