= Happold =

Happold is a surname, and may refer to:

- David Happold (born 1936), British-Australian mammalogist
- Edmund Happold (1930–1996), British structural engineer
- Frederick Crossfield Happold (1893–1971), British educational pioneer and author
- Tom Happold (contemporary), journalist at Guardian Unlimited
