= PVD =

PVD may refer to:

== Places ==
- Providence station (Amtrak station code), an Amtrak and MBTA train station in Providence, Rhode Island, US
- Rhode Island T. F. Green International Airport (IATA and FAA LID codes), Warwick, Rhode Island, US

== Science and technology ==
- Peripheral vascular disease, obstruction of large arteries not within the coronary, aortic arch vasculature, or brain
- Peripheral vision (horizon) display, an aircraft cockpit instrument which assists pilots in maintaining proper attitude
- Personal Video Disc, a special format of discs created by Hasbro Inc. to be used only in their VideoNow product lines
- Physical vapor deposition, vacuum deposition methods used to deposit thin films
- Posterior vitreous detachment, a condition of the eye in which the vitreous membrane separates from the retina
- Primary disorder of vigilance, an attention syndrome

== Other uses ==
- Party for Democratic Action (Partia për veprim demokratik), a political party in Serbia
- Paul van Dyk (born 1971), German trance DJ and producer
