= Victor S. E. Davis =

English headteacher (1929–1957)

- Born: 6 December 1896; West Lavington, Wiltshire, England
- Died: 1 June 1971 (aged 74); Rotherham, West Riding of Yorkshire, England
- Education: St John's College, Cambridge
- Occupations: Educator, headmaster
- Spouse: Lois Ellen Ponting (m. 1920)
- Children: 1

Victor Samuel England Davis (6 December 1896 – 1 June 1971) was an English educator and academic administrator. He is best known for his 28-year tenure as the headmaster of The Latymer School in Edmonton, London, steering the institution through the Great Depression, the evacuation challenges of the Second World War, and the transitional periods brought on by the Education Act 1944.

== Early life and education ==
Victor Samuel England Davis was born on 6 December 1896 in West Lavington, Wiltshire, the eldest son of Albert Sidney Davis and Annie Louisa Davis (née England). The family later lived at 32 Park Street, Salisbury, and Davis was baptised on 14 February 1897 within the Salisbury United Methodist Free Church Circuit. Throughout his life, Davis identified strongly with his Wiltshire heritage, describing himself as a "Moonraker" and noting his English parentage to humorously distinguish his surname from the Welsh "Davies".

Davis began his elementary education at St Thomas's School in Salisbury before winning a scholarship to Bishop Wordsworth's School, where he studied from 1907 until 1914. During his secondary years, he secured both intermediate and major county scholarships and was awarded various form prizes, including the Upper Sixth form prize in 1912. Under the instruction of modern language mistress E. F. M. Jones, he developed a proficiency in French and German, while also receiving musical training on both the piano and the cello.

In 1913, Davis was awarded the first of four annual University Scholarships conferred by the Wiltshire County Education Authority. He matriculated at St John's College, Cambridge, in October 1914, where he was appointed Senior Scholar of the college and performed as a cellist with the Cambridge University Orchestra. In June 1917, he sat the Medieval and Modern Languages Tripos in French and English, graduating with a starred First-Class Honours degree and a special distinction in French, ranking first in his class. St John's College subsequently awarded him the Hughes Prize of Books (valued at £15) and an internal scholarship of £40 per annum to support a planned fourth year of study.

During the First World War, Davis offered himself for military service with the Army, but was rejected on medical grounds. He initially planned to spend the 1917–1918 academic year reading Spanish literature; however, wartime conditions had depleted Cambridge's Arts faculties of both academic staff and students, leaving the Chair of Spanish vacant. Consequently, with two terms of his Wiltshire County scholarship unexpired, Davis left Cambridge in early 1918 to take up his first teaching appointment.

== Career ==
=== Witney Grammar School (1918–1920) ===
In May 1918, having curtailed his postgraduate studies at Cambridge due to wartime staff shortages, Davis took up his first teaching appointment at Witney Grammar School in Witney, Oxfordshire. At the time, Witney was a small foundation providing secondary education for day pupils as well as boarders. Davis taught modern languages at the school for two years, remaining in the post until April 1920, when he joined the staff at Dauntsey's School.

=== Dauntsey's School (1920–1925) ===
Dauntsey's School photograph c.1920/21. Davis is seated on the front row, third from the left

In February 1920, Davis was appointed to the staff of Dauntsey's School, returning to his birthplace of West Lavington, Wiltshire. His appointment was the first made by the newly arrived headmaster, G. W. Olive. At the time, Dauntsey's was a sixteenth-century foundation administered by the Worshipful Company of Mercers, operating as a boys' public boarding school with approximately 100 pupils drawn from across the country.

Davis was initially engaged to teach French throughout the school, as well as English and Spanish. He was soon promoted to Senior Assistant Master. His initial salary was fixed at £275 per annum with residential board and lodging valued at £75; following his marriage at Christmas 1920, his terms were adjusted to £360 per annum non-resident.

Beyond classroom instruction, Davis took an active role in extra-curricular activities. Throughout his five-year tenure, he served as the editor of the school magazine, directed and stage-managed several school dramatic productions, and performed frequently at school musical recitals on both the piano and the cello.

Davis tendered his resignation on 28 July 1925 after securing the post of Senior Modern Language Master at Birkenhead School in Cheshire.

=== Birkenhead School (1925–1929) ===
In September 1925, Davis took up the post of Senior Modern Language Master at Birkenhead School, a day and boarding secondary school for boys on the Wirral Peninsula opposite Liverpool. His appointment was noted in the editorial of the school's magazine, The Birkonian, which highlighted his academic background as a "late scholar of St. John's College, Cambridge". His move to the industrial north marked a distinct shift from his earlier life in southern England, exposing him to an urban, working-class environment that later informed his approach to school leadership in North London.

Unlike his active participation in extra-curricular societies at Dauntsey's, archival records at Birkenhead indicate that Davis did not serve as a form master or participate prominently in school sports and clubs, and he was absent from the 1928 staff photograph. Instead, he concentrated his spare time on academic research. Taking advantage of the school's proximity to Liverpool, he crossed the River Mersey in the evenings to pursue postgraduate work in Spanish literature under the noted Hispanist Professor Edgar Allison Peers at the University of Liverpool. Some of Davis's research was accepted and published in the Bulletin of Spanish Studies, though the thesis remained only three-quarters completed when his appointment to a headship prompted him to set the work aside.

In May 1929, Davis was elected headmaster of The Latymer School in Edmonton. Reporting on his departure at the end of the summer term in 1929, The Birkonian commended him on his promotion, writing: "Mr. V.S.E. Davis is to be congratulated, too, on his having been appointed headmaster of Latymer's School, Edmonton. May he prosper in his new post! We shall be sorry to lose him."

=== The Latymer School (1929–1957) ===
==== Appointment and succession ====
Davis in 1929, when appointed to Latymer

In May 1929, at the age of 32, Davis was selected from among numerous applicants to succeed Richard Ashworth as headmaster of The Latymer School in Edmonton, North London. Following Ashworth's sudden death from pneumonia at Christmas 1928, deputy headmaster James North had served as acting head until Davis formally assumed leadership in September 1929. Latymer was at the time undergoing rapid expansion, transitioning from a small local grammar school into the largest co-educational secondary school in England, with an enrolment growing from approximately 850 pupils to nearly 1,000, supported by a staff of over one hundred.

Davis faced immediate institutional friction upon taking office. Ashworth had been a revered figure across the borough, and staff and pupils constantly invoked his memory and methods. Davis was initially self-conscious about this legacy; attending the school sports day shortly before taking up his post in 1929, he approached former pupils to ask what they believed had been "the secret of Dickie Ashworth's success". However, possessing an austere administrative manner, Davis soon grew impatient with comparisons, remarking within his first month that he was "fed up with the name of Ashworth". Unwilling to compromise with senior staff or delegate authority along traditional lines, he quickly alienated the school's staff; within a few years, all eight of the school's senior male masters resigned (including North) to take up posts elsewhere.

==== Structural and pedagogical reforms ====
Following a comprehensive general inspection by His Majesty's Inspectorate in 1930, Davis carried out extensive organisational restructuring. To manage the rapidly growing school roll, he established two new competitive houses, Dolbé and Ashworth, joining the existing foundation houses. In 1933, he replaced the traditional system of democratically elected house captains with an official prefectorial system, appointing roughly a dozen senior boys and a dozen senior girls on the basis of academic and leadership merit. He also formalised academic streaming through the "Q-form" (quick form), an accelerated track in which academically gifted pupils completed Matriculation in four years rather than five, allowing them to sit their Higher School Certificate early and prepare for Oxford and Cambridge university scholarship examinations.

Davis personally taught First Year Divinity. Each morning, he conducted a compulsory religious assembly in the hall consisting of prayers and a scripture reading delivered by a prefect, though it was not his practice to address the school directly except on special occasions. Foundation Day under Davis was kept deliberately low-key, consisting of an assembly detailing the charitable bequest of Edward Latymer rather than large-scale church services. To ensure equal access for parents, he instituted separate Junior and Senior Speech Days.

Davis was an outspoken commentator on social and pedagogical trends, using annual speech days to address parents on contemporary issues. In 1932, his administration hosted Ellen Wilkinson, one of the earliest female British cabinet ministers, as a guest speaker. Decades later, at the 1953 speech day, Davis cautioned parents against the passive consumption of modern broadcast media, warning of the intellectually dampening effects of television and arguing that it threatened children's capacity to provide their own active, creative recreation.

Davis also introduced modern instructional methods. In 1930, Latymer became one of the first schools in the country to pioneer the educational use of sound film in secondary classrooms. In the summer of 1932, he inaugurated annual public "Open Days", inviting parents and community members to observe classes in session and view exhibitions of student craft and art. In 1936, the Board of Education selected Latymer as one of seven experimental schools across England and Wales to trial a scheme reducing pupil homework in favor of daily physical training. Although the test demonstrated clear gains in pupil fitness and posture, Davis cautioned against educational fads, publicly remarking that while physical standards had improved, the experiments showed no evidence that "brawn makes brain", and he reiterated that academic rigor must remain paramount.

==== The Great Depression and pupil welfare ====
Davis's headship coincided with the severe economic depression of the 1930s. Edmonton, an industrial suburb with substantial working-class deprivation, was heavily impacted by wage reductions and unemployment. Many senior pupils took early morning newspaper rounds or worked as Saturday shop assistants to support their households, causing tiredness in class and restricting participation in after-school athletics.

Economic hardship led to an alarming rate of premature school leavers; between January 1930 and June 1933, more than 250 pupils (including two under the age of 14) were withdrawn from the school by parents who broke their enrolment contracts to send their children into immediate paid employment. In response, Davis quietly provided financial assistance to destitute families through discretionary and hospitality funds and defended scholarship-assisted places. He established a well-resourced Careers Department under master William Cunliffe, coordinating with the Headmaster's Employment Bureau to secure commercial apprenticeships and clerkships for leavers.

==== School culture and extracurricular life ====
Despite municipal parsimony from the Middlesex County Council, which refused funding for capital improvements such as a gymnasium or swimming bath, extracurricular life expanded significantly under Davis. The performing arts were particularly active; Davis played the cello in the large school orchestra alongside colleagues and pupils, while the school choir, under music master Ronald Cunliffe, performed for regular BBC radio broadcasts. Under speech and drama mistress Maisie Cobby, the Latymer Dramatic Society staged ambitious productions ranging from Macbeth to classical Greek tragedy. Several pupils who participated in school dramatics during Davis's headship later achieved prominent theatrical and broadcasting careers, including Bruce Forsyth, Eileen Atkins, Aubrey Woods, Trevor Martin, Leslie Welch, and Edward Burnham.

Athletics also reached competitive prominence during the interwar years, particularly in association football, which produced professional players including Tottenham Hotspur outside-left Leslie Medley and future England national team captain Johnny Haynes. First-team matches against local secondary schools were frequently one-sided, occasionally prompting opposing headmasters to request that Latymer field its reserve side. During the 1930s, Davis reformed the annual sports day, replacing traditional novelty races (such as egg-and-spoon and slow-bicycle contests) with formal, competitive inter-house track and field events. In connection with his sporting responsibilities, Davis served as president of the North Middlesex Secondary Schools' Swimming Association in 1933.

Beyond local competitions, the school maintained an extensive outdoor programme. Annual summer camps were held in locations such as Alton, Hampshire, and the Isle of Arran, supplemented by continental excursions to Paris and Zermatt, Switzerland, as well as pupil exchange schemes with schools in France and Germany. Davis also maintained close links with the Latymer Old Students' Association, regularly presiding over its annual dinners and supporting related bodies, including being elected a joining member of the Edmonton Latymer masonic lodge in September 1941.

==== Staff relations and administrative style ====
Pupil and staff recollections characterise Davis as a large, imposing, and reserved figure who was naturally shy, commanding respect rather than personal affection. He spent much of his working day in his study, with long-serving school bursar Doris Jeffryes acting as a prominent administrative intermediary.

His staffing policies drew criticism from female faculty members. Geography mistress Mary Cullimore recorded that Davis held conservative views regarding women in secondary education, adhering to a principle of not promoting female staff when a male candidate was available. According to Cullimore, the Assistant Mistresses Association noted that Latymer had one of the poorest records in England for awarding responsibility allowances to women. However, Davis continued to recruit female graduates when circumstances demanded; in 1943, he invited former pupil May Bennett back to the school to teach physical education.

In matters of student discipline, Davis maintained traditional standards and occasionally administered the cane in his study. However, entries in the official school Punishment Book indicate that corporal punishment was applied sparingly at Latymer, rarely exceeding a dozen instances across an entire year. Former pupils regarded him as a "remote but benevolent" administrator who successfully guided the school through rapid expansion and wartime upheaval.

==== Second World War and evacuations ====
At the outbreak of the Second World War in September 1939, Davis directed the dispersal of Latymer under the government's evacuation plan, managing the school's administrative and pastoral operations across four disparate sites over the next six years. An initial party of 457 pupils and 50 staff departed by train from Silver Street railway station three days prior to the formal declaration of war, arriving at Clacton-on-Sea in Essex. There, Latymer shared the premises of Clacton High School on a split-shift afternoon timetable and opened a dedicated "Latymer Clubhouse" in January 1940 to maintain student morale. Davis, together with deputy headmaster Harold Champion and senior master William Cunliffe, walked the seafront daily to coordinate billets and student welfare, earning the trio the student nickname "The Blessed Trinity". Davis also negotiated the temporary requisition of the seafront Hadleigh Hotel to house fifth- and sixth-form pupils until disputes with the proprietor regarding fixed government allowance rates brought an end to the arrangement.

Following the end of the Phoney War and an incident in April 1940 when a German mine-laying bomber crashed in the town, Clacton was deemed vulnerable to enemy attack. In May 1940, Champion supervised the emergency transfer of the East Coast contingent across the country to Tonypandy in the coal-mining Rhondda valley of South Wales. Reception for the pupils was facilitated by local Methodist minister Cyril Gwyther and future Speaker of the House of Commons George Thomas, with mining families providing a warm reception despite basic household conditions. A third evacuation was organised in June 1940 in the wake of the Dunkirk evacuation and the Fall of France, with masters Percy Blackwell and Alfred Edwards escorting approximately 100 younger pupils and seven staff to Mawnan Smith in western Cornwall. Teaching took place across the local village hall and the Methodist vestry; in October 1942, Davis donated £20 to the managers of Mawnan Village School to establish a permanent annual prize fund in gratitude for the community's hospitality.

Concurrently, hundreds of unevacuated children drifted back to London, prompting Davis to reopen the home school in Edmonton in September 1940, just as the Blitz began. Davis, teaching colleagues, and senior boys carried out continuous nightly three-shift fire-watching vigils on the school roof throughout the bombing campaigns. The school remained open through the V-1 flying bomb and V-2 rocket attacks of 1944, during which pupils sat their General School and Higher School Certificate examinations on the floor beneath desks in the Great Hall.

==== Wartime pastoral correspondence ====
Alongside managing the four dispersed branches of the school, Davis maintained an extensive personal wartime correspondence network. Approximately 760 former Latymer pupils served in the British armed forces across various theatres. Davis wrote regularly to the vast majority of these servicemen, dispatching news of the school alongside care packages of cigarettes. He also sustained contact with eight alumni held in German prisoner-of-war camps, including Stalag XVIII-A.

On the afternoon of 7 May 1945, Davis summoned the entire student body to the Great Hall to announce that the war in Europe was over, granting the school a full holiday for VE Day the following morning. During the assembly, Davis admitted to pupils that he had privately "agonised every morning" over the decision to continue whole-school gatherings under the threat of aerial bombing, knowing that a single direct hit could destroy "a whole local generation of bright pupils". He reflected that he had maintained the daily routine of prayer, notices, and music because he felt the collective assembly was vital to preserve the spirit of the school and "added colour to our lives" amid wartime austerity.

Davis personally wrote letters of condolence to the families of all 92 former pupils who were killed on active service. In 1945, he supervised the creation of two illuminated vellum memorial rolls recording the names of the fallen and the 25 alumni decorated for gallantry; these volumes were permanently enshrined in the school's War Memorial Library.

==== Post-war reorganisation and Voluntary Aided status ====
In an address to the teaching staff in 1944, Davis articulated his wartime philosophy, stating that the principal duty of the school community throughout the conflict had been "the maintenance of the humanity of the school". Immediately following the war, after an initial civic memorial service at All Saints' Church for the 95 Latymerians killed in action, Davis established the annual in-school Act of Remembrance in the Great Hall. Under this ceremony, which became a school tradition, an ex-service alumnus or alumna was invited each year to lay the memorial wreath in the Great Hall vestibule alongside the Head Boy and Head Girl.

The passage of the Education Act 1944 precipitated a major battle over Latymer's constitutional future. The local Edmonton Labour Party urged the local education authority to reorganise the school into a non-selective neighbourhood comprehensive for Lower Edmonton. Davis and the school governors strongly opposed this measure, arguing that comprehensive reorganisation would dismantle the school's academic grammar traditions and sever its regional intake.

Although alumni and staff discussed applying for Direct Grant status, Davis and the governing body determined that the school foundation lacked the financial endowment to fund the ongoing maintenance of the physical site without state support. Following protracted negotiations with the Ministry of Education and the Middlesex County Council, a new Instrument of Government was sealed in June 1955 granting Latymer Voluntary Aided status. Under this settlement, a 15-member governing body with a two-thirds Foundation majority was established, successfully preserving the school's independent governance and selective grammar status.

In 1952, Davis pioneered a plan to establish an off-site centre for field and outdoor studies, announcing to the school that the governors had purchased Stapleton House and its surrounding grounds in Potters Bar, Hertfordshire. Davis envisioned dispatching three coaches of students to the mansion daily, providing every pupil with a day in the countryside once a fortnight for biology, geography, art, and drama. However, the scheme collapsed due to the high cost of post-war building materials and the failure to secure local planning permission for the necessary extensions.

== Personal life ==
Following the publication of banns at St Mark's, Salisbury, Davis married Lois Ellen Ponting (1894–1977), on 27 December 1920 at St James's Church, Trowbridge. They had one son, Peter Brian Davis (1928–2014), who attended The Latymer School from 1939 to 1944 during his father's headship, read engineering at St John's College, Cambridge, and had a distinguished career as a railway civil engineer, serving as Chief Civil Engineer of the Eastern Region of British Rail and being appointed an MBE in the 1986 New Year Honours.

== Retirement, later life, and death ==
Grave of Victor Davis in Trowbridge Cemetery

Davis retired in July 1957 after 28 years as headmaster of The Latymer School. Although he was only 61 years old, he chose to step down four years before qualifying for his full pension. His early retirement was prompted by physical exhaustion brought on by the cumulative strain of directing a large secondary school during wartime and the demanding post-war administrative disputes with municipal and county education officials regarding the implementation of the Education Act 1944, the future of the eleven-plus examination, and proposals for comprehensive reorganisation.

To commemorate his 28 years of leadership, the school governors purchased and installed a large three-manual pipe organ in the Great Hall, which became known as the "Davis Organ". The instrument possessed a distinctive provenance: its elaborate casing, carved from central European walnut by Swiss or Italian craftsmen in the 1840s, had previously stood at Cowley Manor in Gloucestershire, had been stored at Norwich Cathedral during the Second World War, and was located at the Woolwich Garrison Church of St George before its acquisition for Latymer in 1957. The organ accompanied daily morning assemblies for almost five decades until October 2003, when the ageing pipe mechanisms were replaced with a modern digital console by Wyvern Organ Builders; the 1840s carved walnut case was retained and permanently preserved in the hall.

Following his retirement, Davis moved north to Rotherham in the West Riding of Yorkshire and largely withdrew from public and educational life. Despite maintaining a keen interest in Latymer news from afar, he returned to Edmonton only once during his 14 years of retirement, attending the funeral service at All Saints' Church for E. T. Rhymer, the long-serving Chairman of the Latymer Governors who had been a key ally in preserving the school's foundation status.

In late 1970, Davis celebrated his golden wedding anniversary, receiving numerous messages and tributes from former pupils and colleagues while confined to his sick-bed. He died following a prolonged illness in Rotherham on 1 June 1971, at the age of 74, and was buried in Trowbridge Cemetery. Lois survived her husband by six years, dying in 1977. In addition to the organ in the Great Hall, Davis is commemorated at Latymer by a formal portrait displayed in the school's War Memorial Library, hung adjacent to the two illuminated vellum volumes commemorating the students killed during the Second World War.

== Bibliography ==
- Morris, Joseph Acton (1975). A History of The Latymer School at Edmonton. The Latymer Foundation at Edmonton. ISBN 978-0-9504862-0-8.
- Granath, Andrew (1995). Latymer Remembered Memories Of Latymer School 1882 - 1945. The Latymer Foundation at Edmonton. ISBN 0950541524.
- Seward, Margaret (2009). Open Wide: Memoir of a Dental Dame. ISBN 978-1-84104-107-0.
