= Attitude indicator =

Flight instrument which displays the aircraft's orientation relative to Earth's horizon

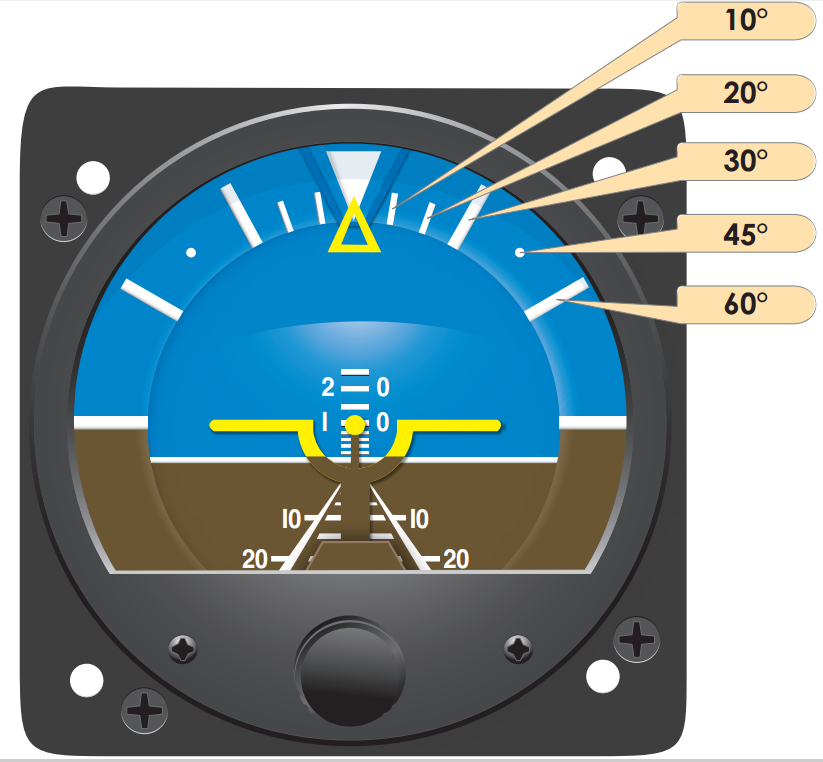
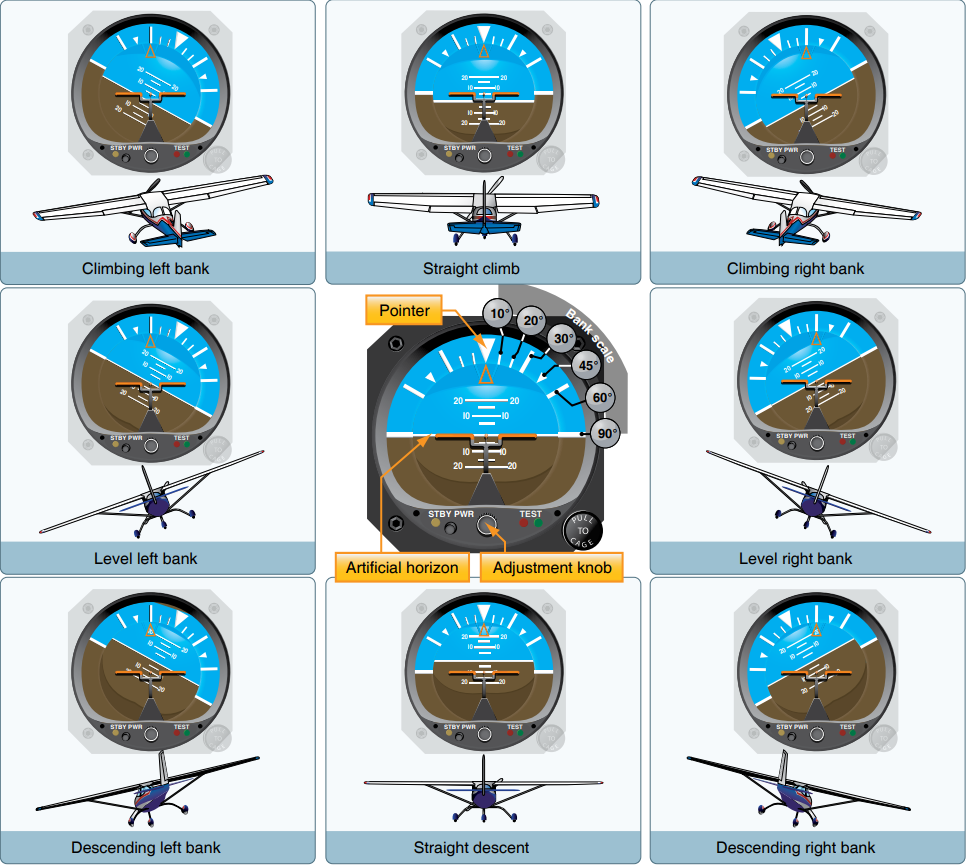
AI with pitch and roll reference lines (left) and the AI relationship to aircraft orientation (right)

The attitude indicator (AI), also known as the gyro horizon or artificial horizon, is a flight instrument that informs the pilot of the aircraft orientation relative to Earth's horizon, and gives an immediate indication of the smallest orientation change. The miniature aircraft and horizon bar mimic the relationship of the aircraft relative to the actual horizon. It is a primary instrument for flight in instrument meteorological conditions.

Attitude is always presented to users in the unit degrees (°). However, inner workings such as sensors, data and calculations may use a mix of degrees and radians, as scientists and engineers may prefer to work with radians.

== History ==
Before the advent of aviation, artificial horizons were used in celestial navigation. Proposals of such devices based on gyroscopes, or spinning tops, date back to the 1740s, including the work of John Serson.

Another notable development came in 1785, when John Adams, an English mathematician and headmaster of Latymer’s Charity School, was awarded a Silver Medal by the Royal Society for the Encouragement of Arts, Manufactures, and Commerce for his invention of an 'Artificial Horizon to be used on Land'. In his letter and historical account addressed to the Society, Adams detailed how he had acquired a siphon circular spirit level in 1764 and, by 1778, had proposed to the London instrument maker Peter Dollond, a method by which it could be adapted to calculate latitude and longitude.

Later implementations, also known as bubble horizons, were based on bubble levels and attached to a sextant. In the 2010s, remnants of an artificial horizon using liquid mercury were recovered from the wreck of HMS Erebus.

== Use ==
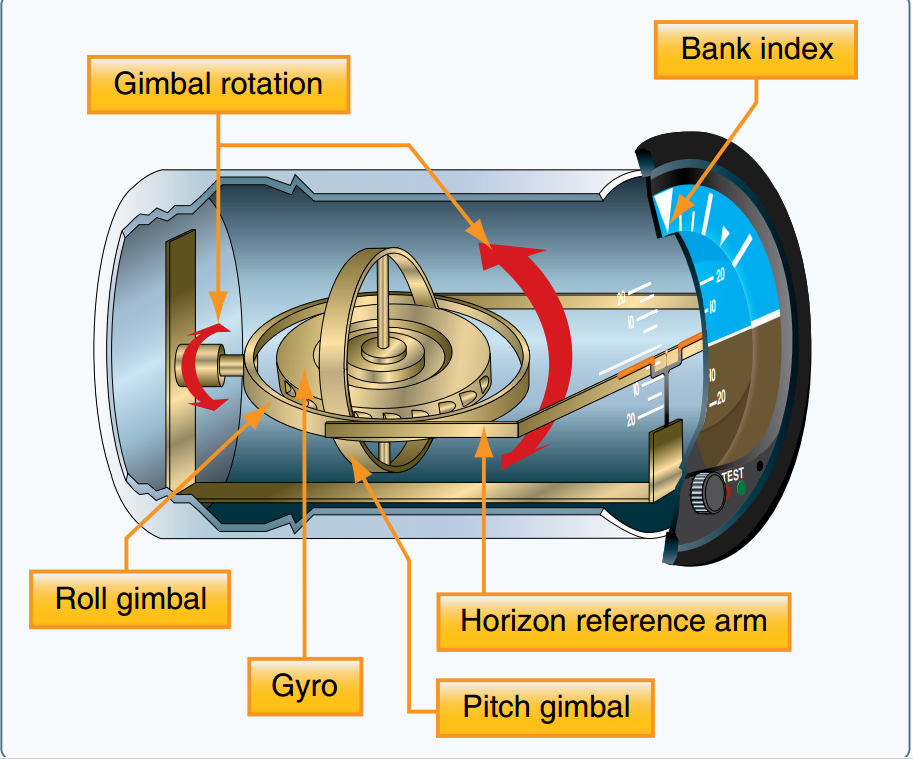
AI interior

The essential components of the AI include a symbolic miniature aircraft mounted so that it appears to be flying relative to the horizon. An adjustment knob, to account for the pilot's line of vision, moves the aircraft up and down to align it against the horizon bar. The top half of the instrument is blue to represent the sky, while the bottom half is brown to represent the ground. The bank index at the top shows the aircraft angle of bank. Reference lines in the middle indicate the degree of pitch, up or down, relative to the horizon.

Most Russian-built aircraft have a somewhat different design. The background display is colored as in a Western instrument, but moves up and down only to indicate pitch. A symbol representing the aircraft (which is fixed in a Western instrument) rolls left or right to indicate bank angle. A proposed hybrid version of the Western and Russian systems would be more intuitive, but has never caught on.

== Operation ==
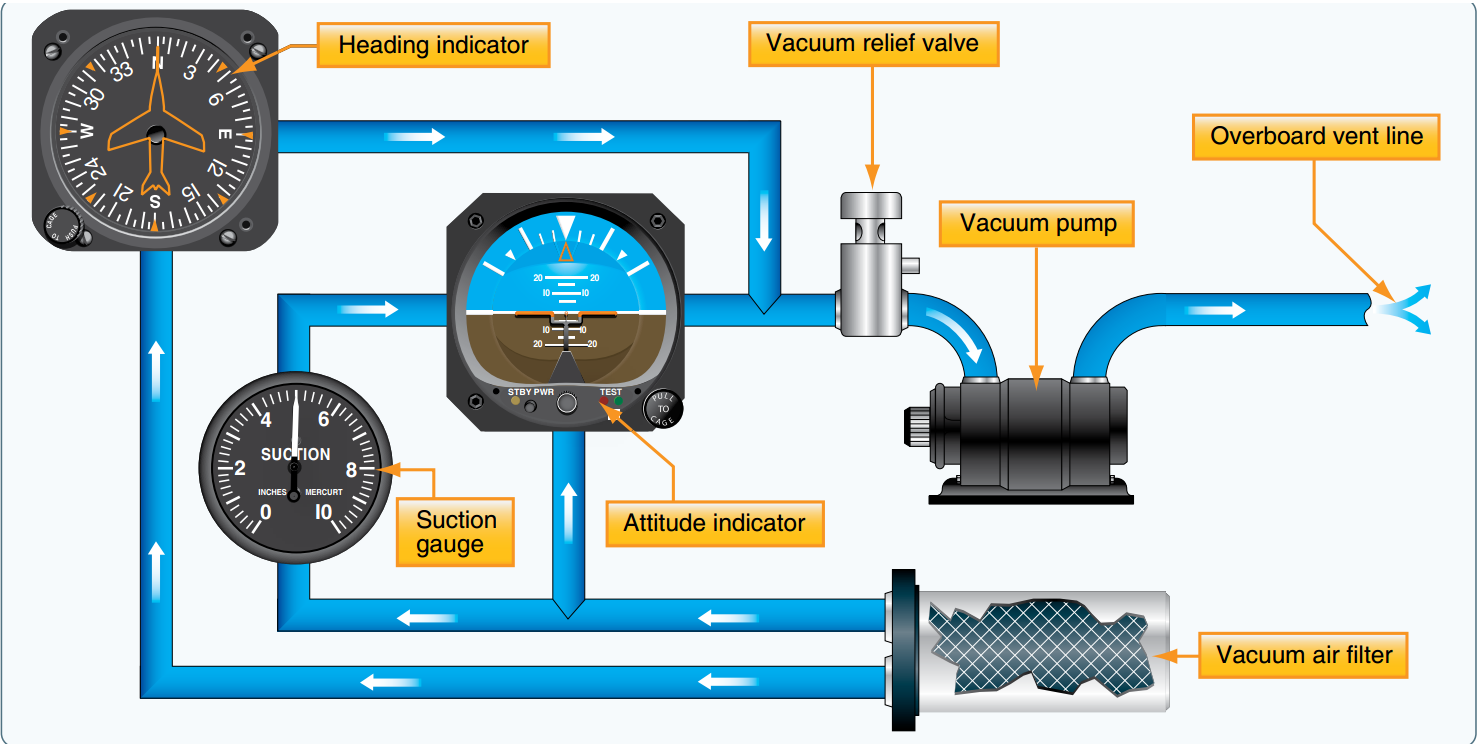
Vacuum system using a vacuum pump

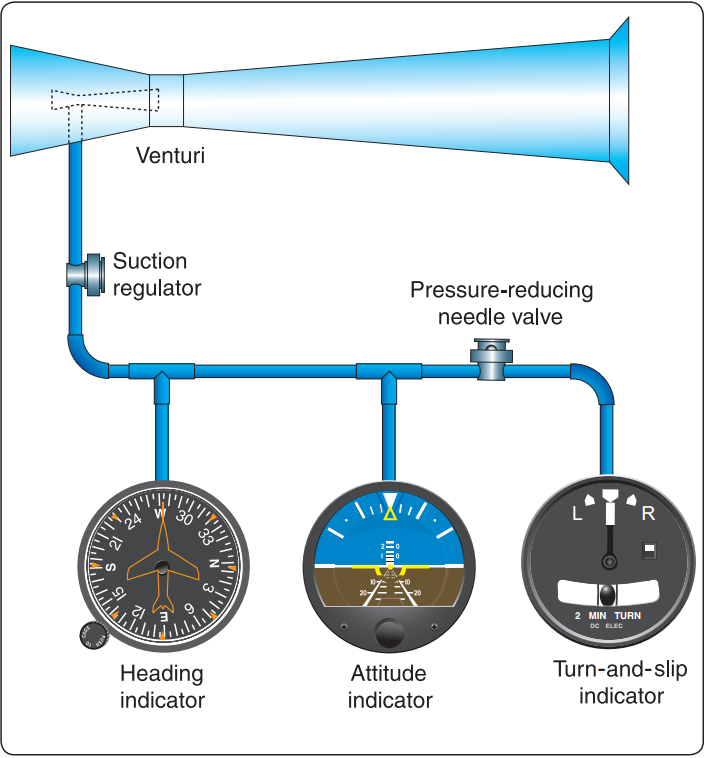
Vacuum system using a venturi

The heart of the AI is a gyroscope (gyro) that spins at high speed, from either an electric motor, or through the action of a stream of air pushing on rotor vanes placed along its periphery. The stream of air is provided by a vacuum system, driven by a vacuum pump, or a venturi. Air passing through the narrowest portion of a venturi has lower air pressure through Bernoulli's principle. The gyro is mounted in a double gimbal, which allows the aircraft to pitch and roll as the gyro stays vertically upright. A self-erecting mechanism, actuated by gravity, counteracts any precession due to bearing friction. It may take a few minutes for the erecting mechanism to bring the gyros to a vertical upright position after the aircraft engine is first powered up.

Attitude indicators have mechanisms that keep the instrument level with respect to the direction of gravity. The instrument may develop small errors, in pitch or bank during extended periods of acceleration, deceleration, turns, or due to the earth curving underneath the plane on long trips. To start with, they often have slightly more weight in the bottom, so that when the aircraft is resting on the ground they will hang level and therefore they will be level when started. But once they are started, that pendulous weight in the bottom will not pull them level if they are out of level, but instead its pull will cause the gyro to precess. In order to let the gyro very slowly orient itself to the direction of gravity while in operation, the typical vacuum powered gyro has small pendulums on the rotor casing that partially cover air holes. When the gyro is out of level with respect to the direction of gravity, the pendulums will swing in the direction of gravity and either uncover or cover the holes, such that air is allowed or prevented from jetting out of the holes, and thereby applying a small force to orient the gyro towards the direction of gravity. Electric powered gyros may have different mechanisms to achieve a similar effect.

Older AIs were limited in the amount of pitch or roll that they would tolerate. Exceeding these limits would cause the gyro to tumble as the gyro housing contacted the gimbals, causing a precession force. Preventing this required a caging mechanism to lock the gyro if the pitch exceed 60° and the roll exceeded 100°. Modern AIs do not have this limitation and therefore do not require a caging mechanism.

Attitude indicators are free from most errors, but depending upon the speed with which the erection system functions, there may be a slight nose-up indication during a rapid acceleration and a nose-down indication during a rapid deceleration. There is also a possibility of a small bank angle and pitch error after a 180° turn. These inherent errors are small and correct themselves within a minute or so after returning to straight-and-level flight.

== Flight Director Attitude Indicator ==
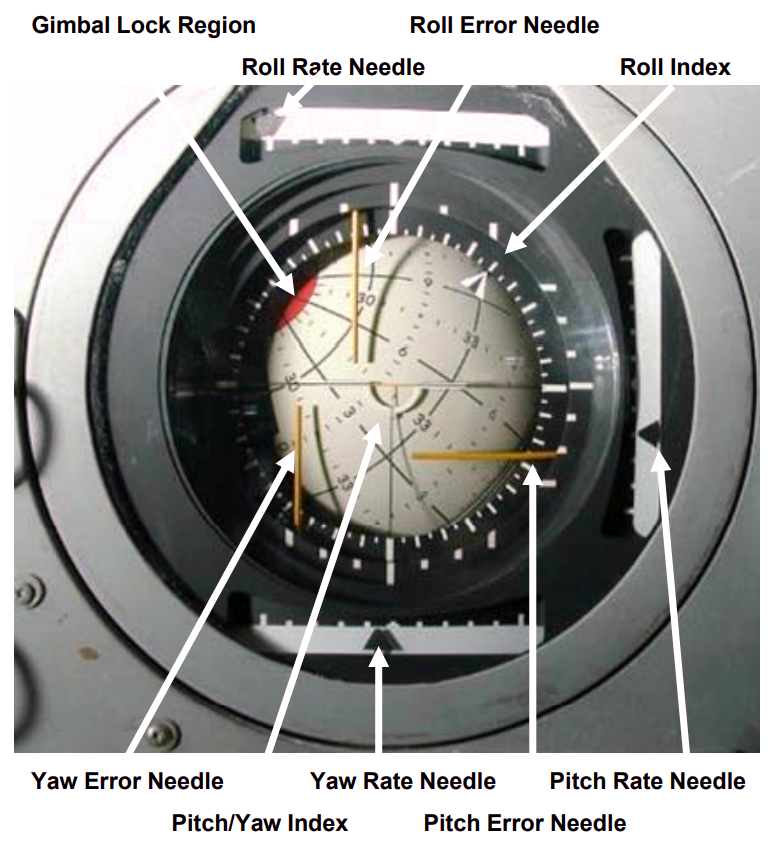
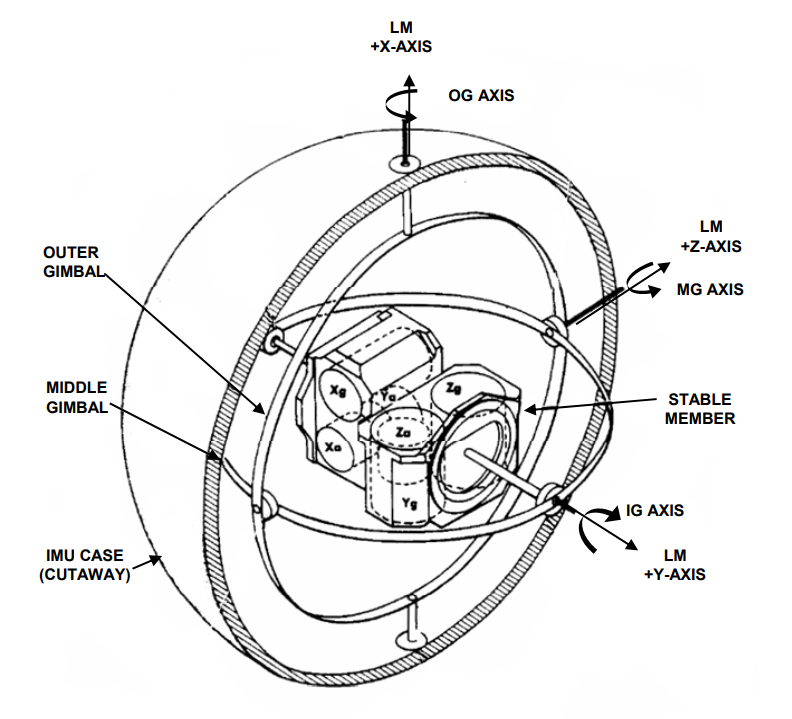
Apollo Flight Director Attitude Indicator (left) and Inertial Measurement Unit (IMU) (right)

Attitude indicators are also used on crewed spacecraft and are called Flight Director Attitude Indicators (FDAI), where they indicate the craft's yaw angle (nose left or right), pitch (nose up or down), roll, and orbit relative to a fixed-space inertial reference frame from an Inertial Measurement Unit (IMU). The FDAI can be configured to use known positions relative to Earth or the stars, so that the engineers, scientists and astronauts can communicate the relative position, attitude, and orbit of the craft.

== Attitude and Heading Reference Systems ==
Attitude and Heading Reference Systems (AHRS) are able to provide three-axis information based on ring laser gyroscopes, that can be shared with multiple devices in the aircraft, such as "glass cockpit" primary flight displays (PFDs). Rather than using a spinning gyroscope, modern AHRS use solid-state electronics, low-cost inertial sensors, rate gyros, and magnetometers.

With most AHRS systems, if an aircraft's AIs have failed there will be a standby AI located in the center of the instrument panel, where other standby basic instruments such as the airspeed indicator and altimeter are also available. These mostly mechanical standby instruments may remain available even if the electronic flight instruments fail, although the standby attitude indicator may be electrically driven and will, after a short time, fail if its electrical power fails.

== Attitude Direction Indicator ==
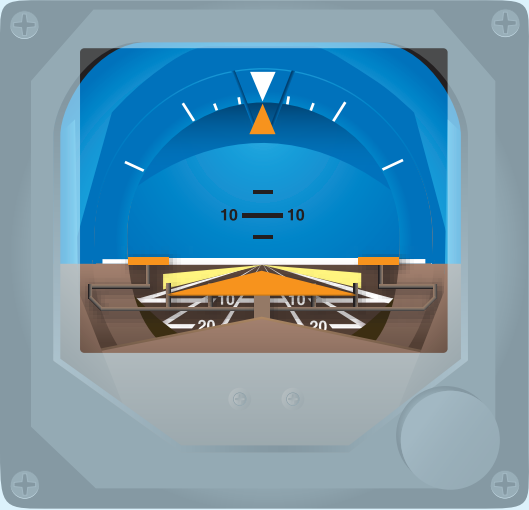
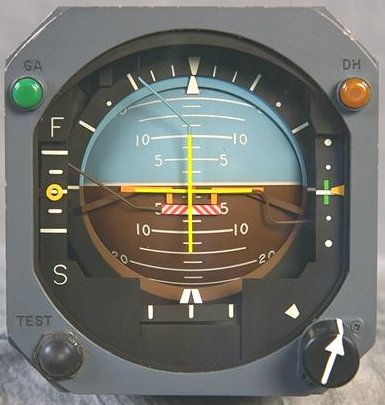
ADI (left) with yellow V steering bars, and an AI integrated with ILS glide slope and localizer indicators (right)

The Attitude Direction Indicator (ADI), or Flight Director Indicator (FDI), is an AI integrated with a Flight Director System (FDS). The ADI incorporates a computer that receives information from the navigation system, such as the AHRS, and processes this information to provide the pilot with a 3-D flight trajectory cue to maintain a desired path. The cue takes the form of V steering bars. The aircraft is represented by a delta symbol and the pilot flies the aircraft so that the delta symbol is placed within the V steering bars.

== See also ==
- Acronyms and abbreviations in avionics
- Air India Flight 855
- Korean Air Cargo Flight 8509
- Peripheral vision horizon display (PVHD)
- Turn and slip indicator
