= Dudley Cockle =

English cricketer and Royal Air Force airman

Personal information
- Full name: Dudley Francis Eugene Cockle
- Born: 30 August 1907; Wilton, Wiltshire, England
- Died: 27 March 1986 (aged 78); Ludlow, Shropshire, England
- Batting: Unknown
- Bowling: Unknown

Domestic team information
- Years: Team
- 1937–1949: Wiltshire

Career statistics
Competition	First-class
Matches	1
Runs scored	37
Batting average	18.50
100s/50s	–/–
Top score	25
Balls bowled	174
Wickets	2
Bowling average	49.50
5 wickets in innings	–
10 wickets in match	–
Best bowling	2/99
Catches/stumpings	1/–
- Source: ESPNcricinfo, 30 June 2019

Dudley Francis Eugene Cockle BEM (30 August 1907 – 27 March 1986) was an English first-class cricketer and Royal Air Force airman. Cockle served as a non-commissioned officer between 1930–49, as well as playing first-class cricket while serving in British India.

== Life and military career ==
Cockle was born in August 1907 at Wilton, Wiltshire. He was educated at Bishop Wordsworth's School, before attending the Royal Air Force College Cranwell. After graduating he entered into the Royal Air Force (RAF) as a non-commissioned officer. While serving in British India made a single first-class appearance for the British Indian Army cricket team against Northern India in the 1934–35 Ranji Trophy at Lahore. Batting twice in the match, he was dismissed for 12 runs in the Army first-innings by Amir Elahi, while in their second-innings he was dismissed for 25 runs by the same bowler. He took two wickets Northern India first-innings, dismissing Ahmed Raza to break a 304-run partnership between Raza and George Abell, with his second wicket of the innings being Charles Kindersley, leaving Cockle with innings figures of 2 for 99. Returning to England, he made his debut in minor counties cricket for Wiltshire in the 1937 Minor Counties Championship, with Cockle appearing fourteen times before the Second World War.

Serving in the war, Cockle held the rank of flight sergeant by its conclusion. He was decorated with the British Empire Medal in the 1946 New Year Honours. He resumed playing minor counties cricket for Wiltshire after the war, making a further eighteen appearances up to 1949. Besides playing cricket, Cockle also played football, rugby union and field hockey for the RAF. After retiring from the RAF in 1949, he went on to coach cricket at King Edward's School, Birmingham between 1949–72. He died at Ludlow in March 1986.
