= David Happold =

British-Australian mammalogist

David Christopher Dawber Happold (born 19 April 1936 in Salisbury, Wiltshire, England), in publications often D. C. D. Happold, is a British-Australian mammalogist. His main research interests are the small mammals (bats, shrews, and rodents) of Africa and Australia.

== Career ==
David Happold is the son of Frederick Crossfield (1893-1971) and his wife Dorothy Vectis Happold, née Halbach. From 1947 to 1955, he attended Bishop Wordsworth's School in Salisbury, where his father was a headmaster from 1928 to 1960. In 1955 - 1957, he spent two years on National Service, and after he obtained his officer's commission, he was posted (as a subaltern) to the 3rd Battalion of The Kings African Rifles in Kenya. In 1957, he matriculated at Peterhouse, University of Cambridge, where he earned his Bachelor of Arts degree in 1960 (Master of Arts 1965). In 1960 he went to Canada, where he attended the University of Alberta in Edmonton until 1963; here he conducted field research on the ecology and distribution of mosquitoes near Flatbush and Athabasca. In April 1963, he submitted his PhD thesis entitled Studies on the ecology of mosquitoes in the boreal forest of Alberta.

In July 1963 he accepted a position at the University of Khartoum, where he changed his interests to mammalogy. During the three years he spent in Khartoum, he travelled the semi-desert regions of Sudan and studied small mammals. Most of his research included ecological studies of the lesser Egyptian jerboa (Jaculus jaculus) and the greater Egyptian gerbil (Gerbillus pyramidum).

In April 1966, he moved to the University of Ibadan in Nigeria (one year before the outbreak of the Nigerian Civil War) and began long-term studies on the demography of terrestrial small mammals in the rainforest, on distribution patterns of small mammals in the savanna areas, reproductive strategies of small mammals, and on the problems of species conservation in the national parks. David Happold lived in Nigeria for 12 years until he and his wife Meredith, an Australian zoologist, were forced to leave the country in 1977 by various circumstances. They moved to Australia and David Happold took up a post at the Zoology Department of the Australian National University in Canberra. From January 1977 until his retirement in August 1998, he worked firstly as a Lecturer and Senior Lecturer and finally as Reader in Zoology.

In Australia, Happold and his students worked on many aspects of small mammal ecology in the subalpine and alpine regions of the Kosciuszko National Park, a few kilometres south of Canberra. The studies dealt with demography, reproductive strategies, habitat selection, food preferences, social behaviour, the effects of altitude (especially snowfall in winter) on many areas of life, and the problems of nature conservation in mountain habitats.

He also continued his research work in Africa. From 1984 to 1985, and from 1993 to 1994, he was a visiting professor at the University of Malawi in Zomba. In collaboration with his wife, he conducted long-term studies on small mammals (rodents, shrews, sengis and bats). This work resulted in many publications in international and local journals. All these publications are available on 'Research Gate'.

In 1983, Happold described the savanna swamp shrew (Crocidura longipes) from Nigeria in collaboration with German mammalogist Rainer Hutterer from the Museum Koenig in Bonn.

== Work ==
In 1971, Happold published the monograph Wildlife Conservation in West Africa on the behalf of the IUCN. In 1973, the book Large Mammals of West Africa was published. In 1979, he wrote the book Ecology of African Mammals in collaboration with Michael James Delany. In 1984, he wrote the chapter Small Mammals in the book Sahara Desert by John Cloudsley-Thompson, and in 1987 he published the book Mammals of Nigeria. This comprehensive reference book is the first field guide to list all 250 mammal species recorded in Nigeria. In 2011, Happold published African Naturalist: The Life and Times of Rodney Carrington Wood 1889-1962 on the game warden and lepidopterist Rodney Carrington Wood, who spent most of his life in Nyasaland (today Malawi). The six-volume work Mammals of Africa was published in 2013, with David Happold as co-editor besides Jonathan Kingdon, Meredith Happold, Thomas M. Butynski, Jan Kalina and Michael Hoffmann. It received the Dartmouth Medal of the American Library Association in 2014. In 2018, Happold published Africa from East to West in which he describes a journey he made between 1965 and 1967 from Massawa in Eritrea (on the coast of the Red Sea) to Cap-Vert in Senegal. He has also published over 100 scientific articles, often co-authored by his wife.

== Honours ==
For his achievements in African mammalian research, David Happold received the degree of Doctor of Science from the University of Cambridge in 1997, and was elected to an honorary life membership of the American Society of Mammalogists. In 2019, David and Meredith Happold were honoured in the specific name Parahypsugo happoldorum, a species of bat from Guinea and Liberia.
