= Montague Gosset =

English surgeon

- Born: 1 July 1792
- Died: 21 October 1854 (aged 62)
- Occupation: Surgeon

Montague Gosset (1 July 1792 – 21 October 1854) was an English surgeon.

== Biography ==
Gosset born on 1 July 1792, was the second son of Daniel Gosset of Langhedge Hall, Tanner's End, Edmonton. He was educated at a school at Broxbourne, Hertfordshire, conducted by a clergyman named Jones.

Although he wished to adopt a learned profession, his father determined that he should join the navy. He was accordingly entered in November 1806 on board H.M.S. Curlew, commanded by Captain Thomas Young. He remained with Young until July 1807, when he was transferred to the Guerrier, and subsequently to the Snake sloop of war, in which he narrowly escaped shipwreck. After serving nearly three years he was invalided from the West Indies with a broken leg and shattered health. On his recovery he resolved to quit the navy and study surgery.

=== Surgery career ===
He was apprenticed to Mr. Stocker of Guy's Hospital in 1809, and obtained his diploma in May 1814. He passed through the hospital with considerable distinction, being a favoured pupil of Sir Astley Cooper. By Cooper he was recommended to the Marquis of Bute, who was then suffering from an eye complaint. In 1815 he went to Scotland for two years, after which he returned to Guy's Hospital, and again devoted himself to study until 1819, when he commenced practice as a consulting surgeon in Great George Street, Westminster.

Thence he removed to the city, where he practised for thirty-four years, first in George Street and lastly in Broad Street Buildings. Gosset was among the first to detect and describe in February 1827 a peculiar accident to the elbow-joint, namely dislocation of the ulna backwards and inwards. In 1829 Gosset communicated the only case of renal aneurism then detected, the preparation of which was placed in the museum of Guy's Hospital.

In 1834 he directed attention to the use of the gilt-wire suture, which he employed in a case of vesico-vaginal fistula of eleven years' standing. Sir Astley Cooper had previously treated the case unsuccessfully with the ordinary appliances. In 1835 he published a description of an improved tonsil iron, which facilitated the application of ligatures for the removal of enlarged tonsils. Having successfully applied nitric acid for the destruction of naevi for twenty years, he published in 1844 a paper showing the efficacy of that remedy. During the same year he detailed a simple yet effective mode of stopping hemorrhage from leech-bites. He also reported an important case of the dislocation of the os malae, which occurred in 1824. He assisted too in introducing two instruments for dividing strictures of the urethra. The first was used at Guy's Hospital as early as 1818.

Gosset was made an honorary fellow of the Royal College of Surgeons in 1843; but, though warmly supported by many of the fellows and the whole medical press, he was never admitted to the membership of the council, on account of his not being attached to the staff of a public hospital. Upon his rejection he issued a manly protest to the profession.

=== Death ===
He died somewhat suddenly at Broad Street Buildings on 21 October 1854, never having recovered from an attack of erysipelas incurred during a post-mortem examination. He was buried in the family vault at All Saints' Church, Edmonton. He had married early, and of a numerous family eight children survived him.
