= Charles Adams (headmaster) =

English Headteacher and Secretary

Charles Henry Adams
- Coat of Arms of Charles Henry Adams
- Born: 1803; Edmonton, Middlesex, England
- Died: 1871 (aged 67-68); Edmonton, Middlesex, England
- Occupations: Schoolmaster, Secretary to the Trustees of the Edmonton Charities
- Years active: 1828–1867
- Known for: Headmaster of the Latymer School
- Children: 6
- Relatives: John Adams I (grandfather)

Charles Henry Adams (1803–1871) was an English schoolmaster who served as the third and final headmaster of the "Adams dynasty" at Latymer's Charity School in Edmonton. His 39-year tenure (1828–1867) is primarily associated with the severe educational decline of the school and a major financial scandal that led to multiple official inquiries by the Charity Commissioners. The controversy surrounding his management of the Edmonton Charities ultimately resulted in his resignation and the fundamental reformation of the school under new leadership.

== Early Life and appointment ==
Charles Henry Adams was born in the schoolmasters house of Latymer’s Charity School in 1803. He was the son of John Adams II and his wife, Elizabeth. Following the family tradition, he was brought up in the school and eventually succeeded his own father to the headmastership in 1828 at the age of 25.

Despite not having a university degree, Adams showed early academic promise. At the age of 21, he published a 28-page tract on the solar system, which he described as the "first fruits of my labours in astronomy". In 1823, under the pseudonym "Philolupas," he wrote a description of his father's complex pupil-grading system for the London Journal of Arts and Sciences. His interest in astronomy continued throughout his life; the school's 1865 attendance register shows him using astronomical symbols for the days of the week.

== Headmastership and School Decline ==
The schoolroom on Church Street during Adams's final year as headmaster in 1867

Adams's long tenure coincided with a period of dramatic population growth in Edmonton, but the school failed to adapt. The education provided was described as "decidedly sub-standard," with the institution functioning more as an elementary charity school than the grammar school its endowments intended. Local dissatisfaction grew, with many feeling that the funds were sufficient to maintain a good free school, yet standards were poor and the curriculum was limited. The school's buildings fell into disrepair, and by the 1850s, a widespread belief had taken hold that the charity's funds were being mismanaged.

== The Edmonton Charities Scandal ==
In addition to his role as headmaster, Adams served as Secretary to the Trustees of the 24 Edmonton charities, including the Latymer Foundation. In this capacity, he was responsible for managing the accounts.

=== Initial Investigation (1848–1858) ===
In 1848, a Vestry Meeting appointed a committee to investigate the management of the Edmonton charities, finding the accounts to be "seriously mismanaged." While the Trustees allowed a brief inspection of the books, they refused the committee access to key documents such as vouchers and receipts. A key piece of evidence was a printed statement of accounts for 1847, signed by Adams, which showed a balance of £645 16s. 9¼d. However, a footnote revealed this figure to be "fictitious," as it included rents that had not yet been received. The actual balance in hand was only £220 6s. 4¼d.

The issue remained unresolved, and public discontent continued to grow. This pressure culminated in an official letter from Charles Henry Adams, in his capacity as Secretary, to the Charity Commission on May 5, 1854. To explain the ongoing deficit, Adams included a lengthy extract from an internal committee report which blamed the problems on long-standing, chaotic accounting practices. The report detailed the practice of recording income before it was received and pointed to numerous errors where money was debited to the charities that was "never in fact at any time received."

...Having examined the accounts of the Edmonton charities for many years past... we have reason for believing that the various modes of keeping the accounts of these years have very much contributed to error... We observe that the practice was for the chief part of the time to give credit for rents, etc., in anticipation of their being received, thus in every such case showing a balance which in fact did not exist. It also appears that during one period the accounts were... by the Secretary adopting those portions of the accounts which he did not keep and incorporating them with such that he did...

— Report of the Trustees' Committee, as quoted in a letter from Charles Henry Adams, 5 May 1854

By framing the issue as a historical and procedural problem that had confused even the Trustees' own committee, Adams's letter effectively deflected any immediate personal responsibility. However, this official admission of years of systemic error failed to satisfy local critics and only intensified calls for the more rigorous, public inquiry that would follow a decade later.

=== The Simons Inquiry (1862–1864) ===
Following years of continued public pressure, the Charity Commission sent an Assistant Commissioner, John Simons, to conduct a full inquiry. The investigation revealed a systemic and long-running financial muddle. Key findings included:

- The Trustees, on Adams's advice, had been paying 5% interest to local tradesmen (such as the school tailor) on overdue bills, using charity funds to do so.
- Adams had been in the habit of issuing post-dated cheques to tradesmen, marking accounts as paid when the funds were still owed.
- The total deficiency between 1851 and 1861, including unrecorded income and mismanaged funds, was found to be £962 3s. 0¾d., more than a full year's income for the charities.

During the inquiry, Adams's defence was contradictory. Publicly, the Trustees (led by their chairman, E. T. Busk) claimed the issue was a simple accounting error, citing Adams's 1854 letter. Privately, however, in an 1864 letter to Simons, Adams claimed his actions were not his fault: "All the other so-called blunders are, as is well known, by direction of the Trustees." Faced with the evidence, Adams eventually agreed to repay the deficit from his salary at a rate of £35 per quarter.

== Resignation and later life ==
The findings of the inquiries made Adams's position untenable. In 1867, he resigned his post as headmaster, with the expectation of receiving a £100 per annum pension. However, the Master of the Rolls, Lord Romilly, who reviewed the case, disallowed the pension.

Charles Henry Adams lived his final years at No. 3 Silver Street Parade, close to the school. He died in 1871 and was buried on 20 November in the churchyard of All Saints' Church, Edmonton, in the same grave as his father and mother.

== Family ==
Charles Henry Adams was married to Jane (née Swayer), a teacher, on 16 June 1834. The couple had six children who lived with them into adulthood. The Adams household was one deeply rooted in professional and educational life; in addition to their parents' careers, the children also pursued middle-class professions.

- Jane Adams (1835-?)
- Charles Henry Adams Jr. (1838-1891), a surveyor
- John Clayton Adams (1841-?), a professor of painting
- Harriett Biddle (1844-1929), a teacher
- Henry William Adams (1846-?), a clerk for the Royal Asiatic Society
- Mariana Adams (1848-?), a teacher

== Legacy ==
Adams is remembered as the headmaster under whom the Latymer School reached its lowest point. In the official history book by Joseph A. Morris, he describes him as a "light-fingered embezzler, so manifestly unfit for the high office of Master." His failure and the public scandal that ensued served as the catalyst for a complete overhaul of the school's governance and curriculum, paving the way for its revival as a modern grammar school under his successor, Rev. Dr. Charles Vincent Dolbé.

== Bibliography ==
- Morris, Joseph Acton (1975). A History of The Latymer School at Edmonton. The Latymer Foundation at Edmonton. ISBN 978-0-9504862-0-8.
