= Anthony Robert Klitz =

English painter

Anthony (Tony) Robert Klitz (3 September 1917 – 19 September 2000) was an artist who specialized in cityscapes, notably London. He was born in Southport, attended Bishop Wordsworth's School in Salisbury and studied art at the Cheltenham Art College (1936–1939), whilst simultaneously training to be an architect. Klitz was enrolled in War Service from 1939 to 1945. He died in Dublin.

"In comparison with other great capitals of the world London remains astonishingly unpainted. Mr. Klitz, an artist with a fine sense of architectural atmosphere and character, has done a great deal to redress the balance. His pictures show a fine but restrained sense of colour and he is engagingly sensitive to the London scene. Mr. Klitz is an artist – and this is a high tribute indeed – whose work will appeal equally to those who live in London and to those who have paid a visit to London, and want to have something by which to remember it. Whether it is Horse Guards Parade or the River, Mr. Klitz has captured that strange pearly light which is the secret of so much of London's grace."

Klitz was a prolific artist, in oil on canvas, with London street and "formal" military scenes such as uniformed guardsmen on duty featuring substantially in his work.
