= John Adams (mathematician) =

English mathematician and astronomer

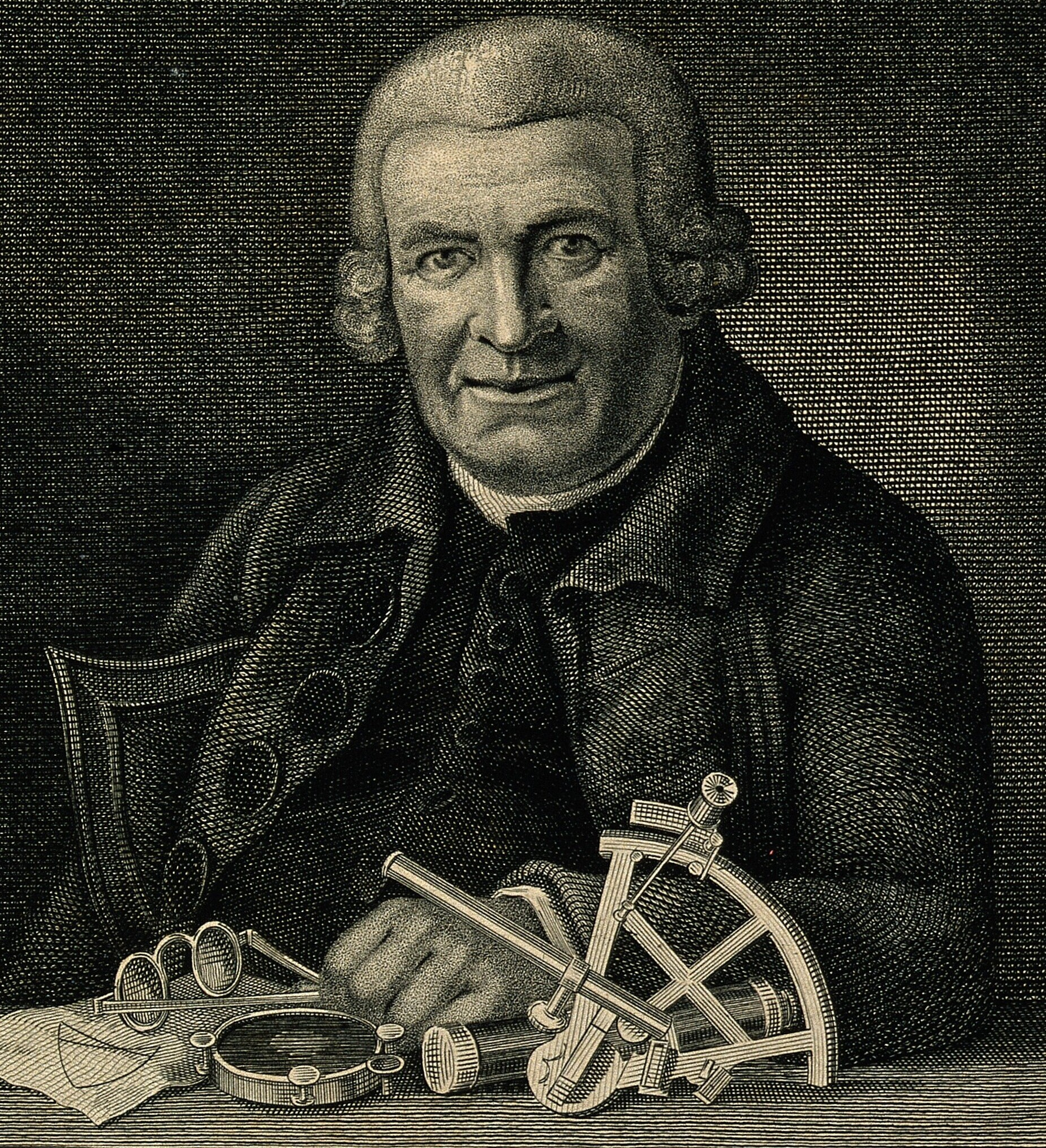
- 1795 engraving by John T. Smith
- Born: c.1737/8 Ponders End, Middlesex, England
- Died: December 1800 (aged 63); Edmonton, Middlesex, England
- Occupations: Mathematician, author, Schoolmaster, Vestry Clerk
- Known for: Authoring The Mathematician's Companion (1796); Invention of an artificial horizon Early meteorological studies in Essex and Middlesex; Headmaster of The Latymer School (1781–1802)
- Spouse: Susannah
- Children: John Adams II, Mary Adams
- Relatives: Charles Henry Adams (grandson)
- Awards: Silver Medal of the Royal Society of Arts (1785)

John Adams (1737/8–1802) was an English mathematician, amateur astronomer, and inventor of the artificial horizon. He also served as the influential Master of Latymer's Charity School in Edmonton from 1781 until his death. He is primarily known for his published work on mathematics and logarithms, his invention of a navigational instrument, and for conducting some of the earliest systematic meteorological studies in the region. His tenure at the school was marked by these scientific pursuits, and he founded the "Adams dynasty" that would lead the institution for the next 86 years.

== Early life and naval career ==
John Adams was born in Ponders End, then part of Middlesex, in 1737/8. As a young man, he went to sea, likely serving in the Royal Navy or on a privateer during the Seven Years' War (1756–1763). It was during this period that his interest in practical science and astronomy was forged.

Adams resided in the Brazils for several years during his time as a seaman. Around 1760, while his ship was in the Brazils, Adams was brought before the Inquisition for heresy. His crime was "daring to converse contrary to the Ptolemaic system," as he had publicly defended the Copernican model of a heliocentric solar system. After the war, he returned to London and on 17 August 1763, was appointed parish clerk of St Mary Magdalen, Old Fish Street, a post he held for several years.

By 1773, Adams had established himself in Waltham Abbey, where he ran the Farmhill Academy. There, he taught "the use of the Nautical Almanack" and a full curriculum of mathematics, navigation, and astronomy. In that year, he published The Young Sea-Officer's Assistant, a practical guide for naval officers covering ship management, navigation of the English Channel, and instructions for commanders in the East India Company service.

== Scientific and scholarly pursuits ==
=== Astronomy and mathematics ===
His primary passion was astronomy, a fact commemorated in a 1795 engraving by his friend, the celebrated etcher John T. Smith, which depicts Adams surrounded by scientific instruments. In 1785, his work gained national recognition when he was awarded the thanks of the Royal Society of Arts and their silver medal for his invention of an artificial horizon on land. This device, crucial for accurately determining latitude and longitude without a natural sea horizon, was a significant practical innovation, it was originally inspired by a circular spirit level he purchased in 1764. He noted that he had first communicated the idea to the prominent London instrument maker Peter Dollond in 1778.

In 1796, Adams published his major work, The Mathematician's Companion. This comprehensive volume included logarithmic tables from 1 to 10,860, along with tables for sines, tangents, and secants. The book, which he prefaced with an introduction to decimal and logarithmic arithmetic, was a significant undertaking for a self-educated man and underscored his mathematical expertise. He identified himself on the title page simply as "Teacher of the Mathematic at Edmonton."

=== Meteorology ===
Adams was also a pioneering local meteorologist. While living in Waltham Abbey in 1774, he maintained a detailed meteorological journal. These records, later published in 1814 part by his son in Extracts from a Meteorological Journal, documented daily temperature and rainfall, and noted significant weather events. His observations included a hail storm in Epping that left hail one inch deep, ice measuring 14¼ inches thick on a pond at High Beech during a severe frost, and the felling of the famous Enfield cedar in a gale in November 1795.

== Master of Latymer's Charity School ==
In 1781, Adams was appointed as the 13th Master of Latymer's Charity School in Edmonton. He took over a small parish institution of only 25 boys, which he ran from a room in his house adjacent to the churchyard. In 1787, he also became the parish Vestry Clerk, a powerful local position he held alongside his headmastership.

Known to his pupils as a stern disciplinarian and "moon haulier," Adams used his position to impart both knowledge and strong moral character. He famously decorated his schoolroom with William Hogarth's series of engravings, Industry and Idleness, and would deliver monthly lectures on them, rewarding hard work and using caning for misbehaviour. He fostered an environment of intellectual rigour, informed by his own scientific passions.

== Personal life and legacy ==
Adams was a respected figure within Edmonton's intellectual and civic circles. He was a close friend of John Thomas Smith, Keeper of Prints and Drawings at the British Museum, and the scholarly Rev. Henry Owen, the vicar of Edmonton and a fellow mathematician. He was also an associate of Sir James Winter Lake, a local dignitary and governor of the Hudson's Bay Company.

John Adams died in December 1800 and was buried at All Saints Church on the 29th of the same month. An auction of John Adams's estate was held in January 1801, featuring a library of ancient and modern books and a collection of scientific instruments, including telescopes, sextants, barometers, and mathematical apparatus.

His most enduring legacy was twofold: he established The Latymer School as an institution with a distinct intellectual and scientific character, and he founded a dynasty. He was succeeded as Master by his son, John Adams II, and in turn by his grandson, Charles Henry Adams, ensuring the family's leadership of the school would continue for another 65 years. His memory also endures locally in the naming of John Adams Court on Church Street, Edmonton, the site where the original Latymer School he taught at once stood.

== Bibliography ==
- Morris, Joseph Acton (1975). A History of The Latymer School at Edmonton.
- Cansick, Frederick Teague (1875). The Monumental Inscriptions of Middlesex Vol III (PDF). London.

== See also ==
- The Latymer School
- History of astronomy
- Royal Society of Arts
