= Mammals of Africa =

Book series

Mammals of Africa is a book series of six volumes from Bloomsbury Publishing. Published in 2013 and edited by Jonathan Kingdon, David Happold, Thomas Butynski, Michael Hoffmann, Meredith Happold and Jan Kalina, it describes every species of African land mammal which comprise 1,160 species and 16 orders.

== Published volumes ==
- Volume 1: Introductory Chapters and Afrotheria, edited by Jonathan Kingdon, David Happold, Thomas Butynski, Michael Hoffmann, Meredith Happold and Jan Kalina (352 pages)
- Volume 2: Primates, edited by Thomas M. Butynski, Jonathan Kingdon and Jan Kalina (560 pages)
- Volume 3: Rodents, Hares and Rabbits, edited by David C.D. Happold (784 pages)
- Volume 4: Hedgehogs, Shrews and Bats, edited by Meredith Happold and David C.D. Happold (800 pages)
- Volume 5: Carnivores, Pangolins, Equids and Rhinoceroses, edited by Jonathan Kingdon and Michael Hoffmann (560 pages)
- Volume 6: Pigs, Hippopotamuses, Chevrotain, Giraffes, Deer and Bovids, edited by Jonathan Kingdon and Michael Hoffmann (704 pages)
