= John Serson =

John Serson (died 1744) was an English sea captain best known for his invention of a "whirling speculum". This was an early form of artificial horizon designed for marine navigation, consisting of a mirror, attached to a spinning top, that attempted to remain in a horizontal plane despite the movement of the ship. This device can be seen as a precursor to the gyroscope used in modern inertial navigation, although it was not itself a gyroscope.

Serson was lost at sea on HMS Victory in 1744.

== See also ==
- Artificial horizon
