= Peripheral vision horizon display =

Aircraft cockpit instrument which assists pilots in maintaining proper attitude

The peripheral vision horizon display, also called PVHD or the Malcolm Horizon (after inventor Dr. Richard Malcolm), is an aircraft cockpit instrument which assists pilots in maintaining proper attitude.

The PVHD was developed in the mid-1970s and manufactured in the early 1980s as a cockpit instrument to assist the pilot with being better aware of the aircraft attitude at all times. The development of the PVHD was driven by a high incidence of military aircraft accidents due to "attitude awareness issues." The PVHD was noted to have a subliminal effect on the pilot because in actual use the display was set so dim that it could barely be seen.

The PVHD was well received by pilots that tested it in helicopters as well as fixed-wing aircraft. It was flown in F-4s and A-10s, as well as helicopters. Initial production in 1983, however, was for the SR-71 Blackbird as an aid when refueling in the air.

The initial concept demonstration was done in Canadian military laboratories and later development was undertaken by Varian Canada in Georgetown, Ontario. In 1981, Varian sold the project to Garrett Manufacturing in Rexdale, Toronto, Ontario.

== Function ==
In the simplest variant, the PVHD projects a dim line of light across the full width of the cockpit instrument panel. This line is projected over the top of all instruments. As the aircraft pitches and rolls, the line appears to stay parallel to the horizon outside of the aircraft. There is a small blip in the center of the line to indicate which way is up.

In actual use, the pilot initially sets the brightness of the line so that it just disappears when looking at it with their central vision. When the line does move due to an aircraft attitude change, the peripheral vision, being more sensitive to movement, picks up the movement and the brain subconsciously registers the information, and makes use of it.

In all variants, the aircraft gyro system provides pitch and roll information for the processor, which drives the projection system to keep the line parallel to the earth horizon. The subliminal effect on the pilot's peripheral vision aids them in retaining attitude awareness and quickly correcting the onset of the aircraft deviating from the desired attitude.

== Benefits ==
The PVHD helps when the real world horizon is blocked by weather or darkness, and the cockpit workload is so high that full attention cannot be given to the standard attitude instrument. The situation can be made worse by inertial effects of the aircraft fooling the pilot's organs of balance. These inertial effects can cause somato-gravic or somato-gyral illusions. In short, the pilot gets the wrong understanding of the aircraft attitude, often with a fatal outcome.

== Variants ==
Several variants were built. The concept demonstration was done with conventional optics that projected a white line from a xenon arc lamp. The projector was driven by an analog computer and the lamp (line) was moved by servo motors.

A later production version used a microprocessor to sample and process the pitch/roll gyro information and a HeNe laser as a light source for the projector. The projector consisted of X and Y axis galvanometers to scan the line across the cockpit at more than 30 times per second in the form of a vector scanned display. This type of projection technology is now commonly used in laser light shows.

=== Lockheed SR-71 ===
The Lockheed SR-71 "Blackbird" reconnaissance aircraft was fitted with a PVHD system. The system also included a heading indication, using varying light intensities along different segments of the horizon line.

=== Fairchild Republic YA-10B ===
During the development of the single-seat night-attack version of the A-10 Warthog aircraft a PVHD system similar to that of the Lockheed SR-71 was incorporated.
