= All Saints' Church, Edmonton =

Coordinates: 51.6258°N 0.0659°W

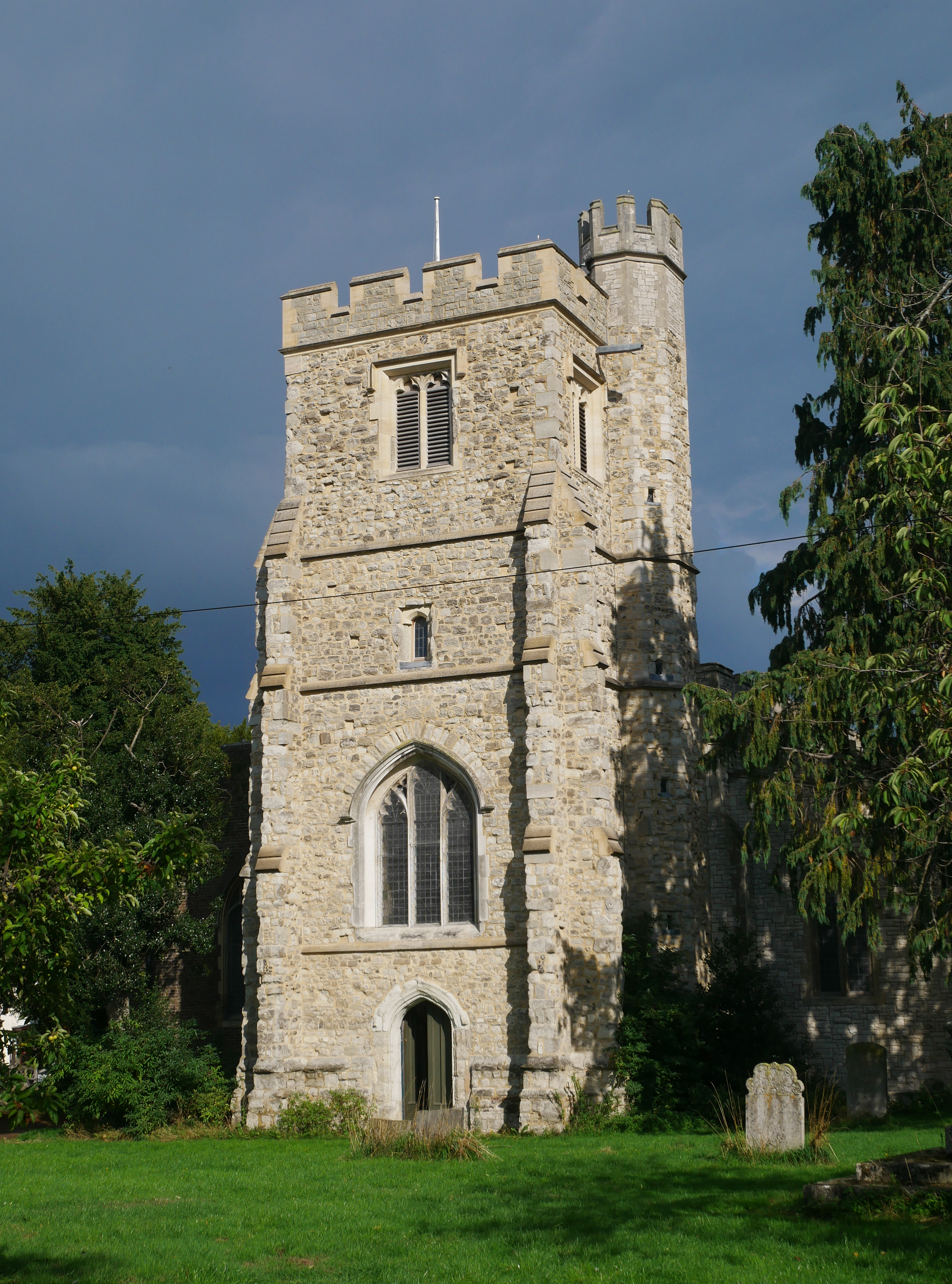
- The tower at the west end of the Church of All Saints
- All Saints' Church, Edmonton
- Country: England
- Denomination: Church of England
- Website: Official website

Architecture
- Heritage designation: Grade II*

Administration
- Diocese: London
- Archdeaconry: Hampstead
- Deanery: Enfield
- Parish: All Saints Edmonton

Clergy
- Vicar: Roxane Liddell

All Saints' Church, Edmonton, is located in Church Street Edmonton, London, England. First recorded in the 12th century, it was entirely rebuilt in the 15th century and has undergone many modifications since.

== History ==
All Saints is the parish church of Edmonton, formerly in the county of Middlesex and now in the London Borough of Enfield.

The earliest known reference to the existence of the church comes in a document dating to some time between 1136 and 1142, which records it being given to Walden Abbey by Geoffrey de Mandeville. It was completely rebuilt in the 15th century, and has undergone many significant alterations since. In 1772 the exterior was clad in brick and all the tracery, except that of the chancel, was replaced with wooden window frames. William Robinson, an early 19th-century historian of Edmonton, attributed the nature of the work to the fact that one of the churchwardens was a bricklayer, and the other a carpenter. When Robinson described the church, it had only one aisle, on the north side of the nave.

The church's rector in 1772, Dawson Warren, regretted the architectural changes, and described them in verse:

The buttresses were chipped away and cased
The ancient battlements built up and coped
With square-cut stones, the Gothic window frames
The costly work of our forefathers' zeal
With sacrilegious hands were torn away
And changed for timber…

The chancel was restored by Ewan Christian in 1855 and the 18th-century wooden tracery was replaced in stone in 1868. In an extensive refurnishing of 1871 the galleries, added in the late 18th century were removed, and the box pews replaced. In 1889 a south aisle and an organ chamber were added to designs by Ewan Christian's former assistant WG Scott. The four-stage 15th-century west tower is now the only part of the church that retains its medieval exterior. Inside, the nave roof and north arcade also date from the 15th century, while the south arcade dates from the alterations of 1889.

== Notable burials ==
- Montague Gosset, surgeon
- Charles Lamb, essayist.
- Mary Lamb, writer and sister of Charles Lamb.
- Tryphosa Jane Wallis, actress
- Ann Wyatt, philanthropist
- John Adams, mathematician and astronomer
- Charles Henry Adams, headteacher and secretary
