= Savanna swamp shrew =

Conservation status
- Data Deficient (IUCN 3.1)

Scientific classification
- Kingdom: Animalia
- Phylum: Chordata
- Class: Mammalia
- Order: Eulipotyphla
- Family: Soricidae
- Genus: Crocidura
- Species: C. longipes

Binomial name
- Crocidura longipes Hutterer & Happold, 1983
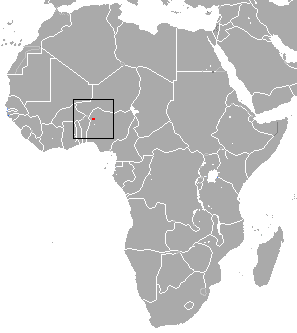
- Savanna swamp shrew range

Species of mammal

The Savanna swamp shrew (Crocidura longipes) is a species of mammal in the family Soricidae. It is endemic to Nigeria. Its natural habitat is swamp.
