= Bishop Wordsworth's School =

Location
- The Close; Salisbury, Wiltshire, SP1 2EB; England; 51.0647°N 1.7975°W

Information
- Type: Grammar school; academy
- Motto: Veritas in Caritate; Truth in Love
- Religious affiliation: Church of England
- Established: 1889
- Founder: John Wordsworth
- Department for Education URN: 136500 Tables
- Ofsted: Reports
- Headmaster: Mike Baxter
- Gender: Boys (mixed sixth form)
- Age: 11 to 18
- Enrolment: 1184 (September 2024)
- Houses: Jewell, Martival, Osmund, Poore, Ward
- Colours: Dark blue and silver/white
- Publication: Wordsworth magazine
- Alumni: Old Wordsworthians (BoBs)
- Website: www.bishopwordsworths.org.uk

Bishop Wordsworth's School is a Church of England boys' grammar school in Salisbury, Wiltshire for boys aged 11 to 18. It was granted academy status in 2011 and is an Additional Member of the Headmasters' and Headmistresses' Conference. It is within the grounds of Salisbury Cathedral, adjacent to the Cathedral School.

Sixth form teaching was in collaboration with South Wilts Grammar School for Girls until June 2020; from September 2020 the school admitted girls direct to its sixth form, with 45 joining Year 12.

The school's full name is Bishop Wordsworth's Church of England Grammar School, shortened to BWS. It is known colloquially as Bishop's, and its students as Bishop's Boys. The school's motto is Veritas in Caritate, taken from the Latin text of Ephesians 4:15: "(Speaking the) truth in love".

== History ==
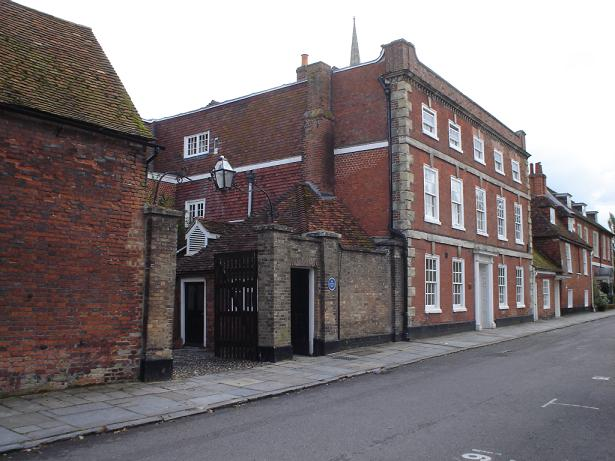
Bishop Wordsworth's School, No. 11 The Close. The cathedral spire is visible in the background.

The school was founded in June 1889, when the bishop of Salisbury, John Wordsworth, announced to his friend Canon Woodall, "I should like to see Salisbury a great educational centre. I should like to found a school which shall be equal to the greatest and best of our public schools." His initial desire that working class boys were not to be admitted caused much controversy. Fees were initially set at £1.10s.0d, and boarding fees were £2 per term; however, the fees were raised to £9 in 1894 to meet the unexpected costs of the school. During the first year, classes were taught in the bishop's palace of Salisbury itself. Bishop Wordsworth personally donated £3000, which was used to purchase an area of land in the cathedral close and to build the school's first buildings. After Wordsworth's death, the school was renamed Bishop Wordsworth's School, having been previously known as "The Bishop's School".

In 1905, the school became a grammar school, its buildings consisting of the current Chapel Block and Bishopgate. Between 1905 and 1927 the school also used buildings in the Friary and also on New Street in Salisbury. Until 1928 the school admitted both boys and girls, but from 1927, with the founding of a girls' grammar school in the city called South Wilts Grammar School, the school admitted boys only.

In 1931 a hall, science laboratories and a library were built. By the 1930s, the school had achieved a reputation for pioneering educational work, and in 1936 became a public school. During the Second World War, pupils from the Priory School in Portsmouth moved to BWS to avoid the bombing of the city. In 1948 the governors accepted voluntary controlled status, which meant being funded by Wiltshire County Council as local education authority and accepting its supervision. Boarding at the school in the Bishopgate buildings ended in the 1950s, and the buildings were used for teaching thereafter.

The school now educates boys aged 11 to 18 in years 7–13 and girls aged 16 to 18 in years 12–13.

In 2002, a major redevelopment of the school's site and buildings commenced. A new classroom block and drama studio were followed by an extensive sports hall and physical education facilities, and a sixth form block was finished in July 2010. The old sports hall was converted to house the art department, and the design technology block has been expanded. In 2011 a new cookery room was completed with the reception moved from The Close to Exeter Street and in 2017 the new Maths Block was completed.

Under the specialist schools programme which ended in 2011, the school was awarded specialisms in languages in 2004 and science in 2008.

The school converted to single academy status in 2011. It has five houses, named after bishops of Salisbury: Poore, Osmund, Jewell, Martival and Ward.

In 2016 the school was criticised for asking parents for money towards their sons' exam costs. One Bishop Wordsworth's School parent said the school was not private and should not be "money grabbing". Headmaster Stuart Smallwood defended the school, saying it did not receive enough government funding and that the payments were entirely optional.

In October 2021, it was reported that Wiltshire Police had investigated drugs activity among a small number of pupils. The previous month, a 14-year-old boy had been arrested on suspicion of being involved in the supply of Class A drugs.

In March 2023, it was reported that a student in Year 10 had been arrested on suspicion of sending social media messages threatening to perform a mass shooting at the school.

In December 2024, the Salisbury Journal reported that headmaster Matthew Morgan had left the school for personal reasons, after three months in the post. The current head is Mike Thorne, previously deputy head, who holds the post in an interim role until the appointment of a permanent head in September 2026.

== Entrance ==
Entry to the school is regulated by the 11-plus. Applicants sit the test in year 6, at the age of 10 or 11. The exams are held in September at the school itself. There are also limited twelve plus and thirteen plus admissions, similarly by examination. Sixth form admission is administered by the head of sixth form, and is granted on the basis of GCSE results. Pupils must achieve more than 52 points (including at least 5 in maths and English language) in their top 8 GCSEs to continue their studies in sixth form, as well as a relatively high grade in the options they propose to take.

== Notable staff ==
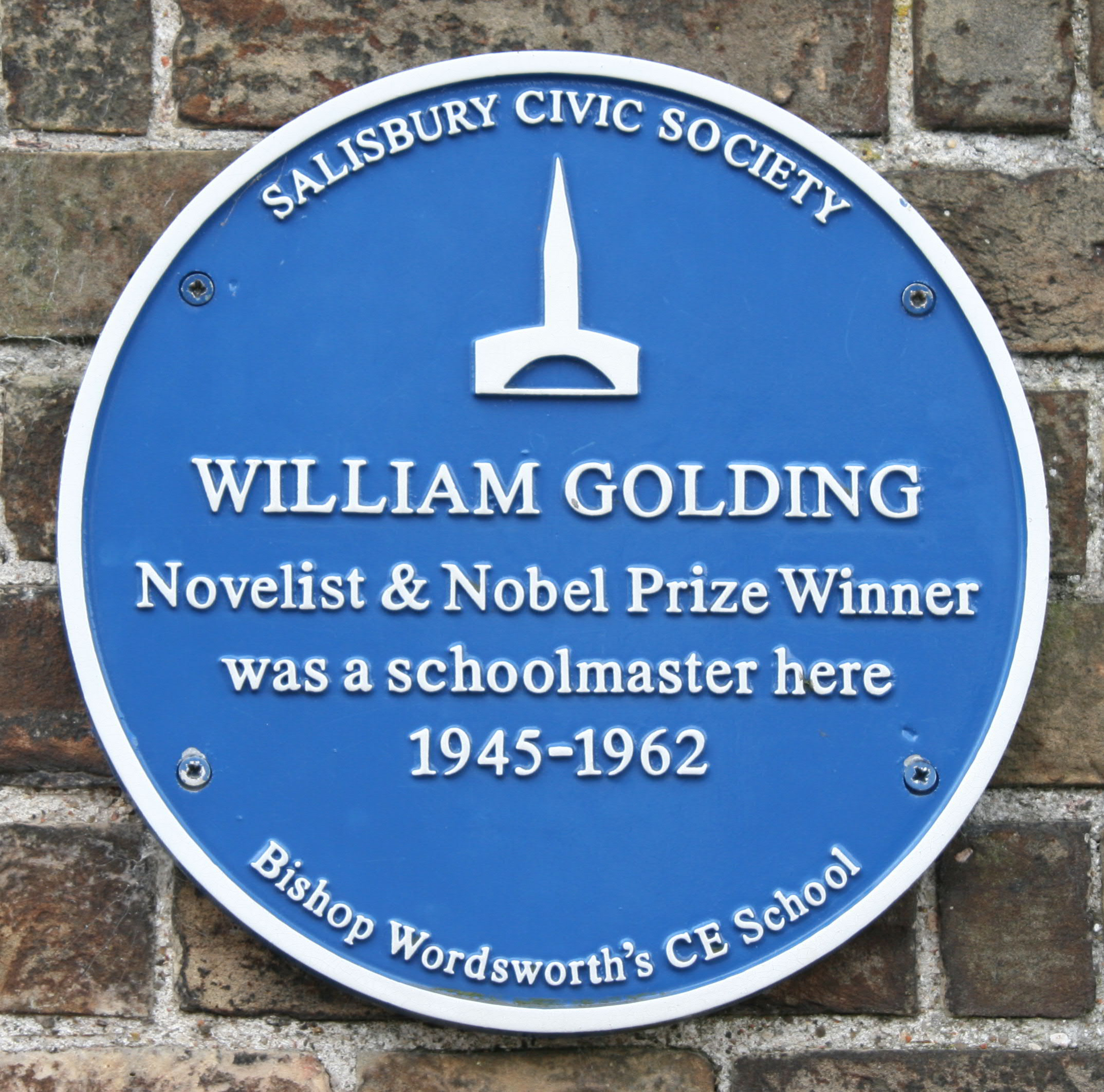

Sir William Golding, winner of the Nobel Prize in Literature, was a schoolmaster teaching philosophy and English in 1939, then English and religious education from 1945 to 1962. Lord of the Flies was Golding's first book, written in 1954, and it is widely believed that its main characters were based on Golding's students.

Golding also regularly sang with Bishop Wordsworth's School choir. He was known affectionately as "Scruff" by the pupils due to his sometimes unkempt hair and beard and his carefree dress sense. After Golding's death in 1993, the school choir sang at his memorial service in Salisbury Cathedral. In March 2005 a plaque was placed at the school to commemorate Golding's time as a teacher.

Headmaster Happold was also noted for the foundation of the "Company of Honour and Service". Kenelm Foster wrote:

"[the company is] a sort of modernist Grail (for Boys) or Solidarity which Dr Happold founded in 1935 at Bishop Wordsworth's School, Salisbury. This is his nucleus, his 'order', his new aristocracy, which is to permeate England: a little cohort of leaders, of seers, of doers." (Cited in Happold, 1964, pp. 33).

Alan Harwood was a notable organ scholar and taught music at Bishop Wordsworth's School. After Harwood's death in 2003, composer Sam Hanson (organist/director of music at St Peter's Church, Bournemouth, formerly organ scholar at Jesus College, Cambridge), dedicated a requiem to him.

Former headmaster Clive Barnett (who left the school in 2002) is a patron of EdUKaid, a charity working in Tanzania.

In 2009, a retired teacher who was being investigated for indecent assault killed himself by inhaling helium. Nicholas Bray was found dead at his home by police officers on 12 June 2009 after failing to attend an appointment at Salisbury Police Station. He had been arrested in 2007 for an assault dating back several years and was also being investigated for possessing indecent images.

In August 2024, Stuart Smallwood retired as headmaster after 22 years and was succeeded by Matthew Morgan, formerly headmaster at Sir Thomas Rich school in Gloucester.

== Headmasters ==
- 1890–1928: Reuben Bracher
- 1928–1960: Frederick Crossfield Happold
- 1960–1964: Ernest Ethrin Sabben-Clare
- 1964–1974: Robert Cabot Rowsell Blackledge
- 1974–1992: Glyn Evans
- 1992–2002: Clive Barnett
- 2002–2024: Stuart Smallwood
- 2024–2024: Matthew Morgan
- 2025–2025: Stuart Smallwood (interim)
- 2025–2026: Mike Thorne (interim)
- 2026-present: Mike Baxter

== Notable alumni ==
Science

- Mark Oxborrow, professor at Imperial College London, co-discoverer of the room-temperature solid-state maser
- Professor Patrick Eyers, Johnston Professor of Biochemistry at University of Liverpool, who co-discovered the gatekeeper residue in protein kinases in 1998 and studies the roles of kinases and pseudoenzymes in human biology. He has published over 100 peer-reviewed papers in the field of kinase regulation and been cited over 11,000 times

Military

- Walter Edward Maxfield, lieutenant colonel 1st Battalion, Canadian Mounted Rifles, CEF (The Bishop's School: 1890–1892)
- William Sholto Thesigerwst Douglass, colonel, Royal Engineers
- Tom Adlam, lieutenant colonel, Bedfordshire and Hertfordshire Regiment, Victoria Cross recipient
- George Woolnough, lieutenant colonel, The Wiltshire Regiment (Duke of Edinburgh's)
- Chris Moon, captain, Royal Anglian Regiment
- Richard Crisp, lieutenant, Special Air Service Regiment, executed by enemy forces during SAS/SOE Operation Bulbasket
- F N Robertson, flight sergeant, No 261 Sqn, Hurricane fighter ace with 11th most kills of any Commonwealth pilot in World War II
- Dudley Cockle, flight sergeant, Royal Air Force airman; recipient of the British Empire Medal
- Percy Morfill, squadron leader, a flying ace of the Royal Air Force during World War II

Sports

- Dudley Cockle, cricketer
- David Egerton, England rugby international player
- Richard Anthony Hill, former Saracens and England international rugby union flanker, player/captain/winner RWC 2003
- Richard John Hill, coach and former Bath and England international rugby union scrum half, player/captain
- Cadan Murley, Harlequins and England international rugby union wing
- John Shaw, England XI hockey captain and Olympian
- Tom Heathcote, Bath Rugby fly-half
- John Coundley, racing driver
- Jonathan Copp, (BWS: 1969–1977) England and Great Britain Olympic hockey squad coach
- James McIntosh, English Channel swimmer

Business

- Colin Sharman, Baron Sharman, chairman of Aviva Group and former chairman of KPMG International, Prime Ministerial Trade Envoy to Morocco

Arts

- Ralph Fiennes, actor
- Joseph Fiennes, actor
- Tim Hampton, film producer
- Anthony Robert Klitz, major, Middlesex Regiment, artist
- Hamish Milne, concert pianist and professor of piano at the Royal Academy of Music
- David Oakes, actor
- Otto Plaschkes, movie producer
- Andy Sheppard, jazz musician
- Nigel Shore, principal oboist with the Komische Oper Berlin
- Peter Thursby, sculptor
- David Bates, conductor
- Barney Norris, novelist and playwright
- James Marriott, musician

Education

- Basil Chubb, professor of Irish history at Trinity College Dublin, author, and interned during the Second World War in Stalag Luft III
- Andrew Copp, neurobiologist
- Andrew Tym Hattersley, head of the Exeter Diabetes Genetics Centre, professor of molecular medicine, Peninsula Medical School, University of Exeter, consultant physician, Royal Devon and Exeter NHS Foundation Trust, great-grandson of John Wordsworth, the bishop of Salisbury, who founded BWS.
- Prof. Chris Sangwin, mathematician, University of Edinburgh
- Victor Samuel England Davis, headmaster of The Latymer School

Legal

- Ken Macdonald, warden of Wadham College, Oxford, director of public prosecutions (DPP), head of the Crown Prosecution Service (CPS) from 2003 to 2008

Politics

- David Munro, Conservative police and crime commissioner for Surrey 2016–2020
- Tom Copley, Labour Party London Assembly member

Religion

- Mervyn Alexander, the 8th bishop of the Roman Catholic Diocese of Clifton, from 1974 to 2001
- Wilfred Frank Curtis, major, Royal Artillery, Anglican priest

Journalism

- Andrew Harvey, BBC newsreader
- Anthony Hayward, journalist and author

Other

- Cecil Chubb, last private owner of Stonehenge
- Mark Labbett (born 1965), quizzer
- Frank Noyce, member of the Governor-General of India's Executive Council from 1932 to 1937, and member of the Indian Public Schools' Society (IPSS)
- Sir Graham Smith, HM chief inspector of probation from 1992 to 2001
- Ralph Whitlock farmer, broadcaster, conservationist, journalist and author

== Sources ==
- Happold, Frederick Crossfield, Bishop Wordsworth's School 1890 – 1950. Privately printed for Bishop Wordsworth's School, 1950, 124pp.
- Happold, Frederick Crossfield, Religious Faith and Twentieth-Century Man. Pelican Original, 1964.
- 'Roman Britain in 1954: I. Sites Explored: II. Inscriptions', The Journal of Roman Studies, Vol. 45, Parts 1 and 2. (1955), pp. 121–149.
- United Kingdom Census 1901
- British Army Medals & Honour Rolls 1914–1920
