= Kwana Island =

Island in Surinam

Native name: Kwana Eiland
- Interactive map of Kwana Island

Administration
- Suriname
- Brokopondo District

Additional information
- Official website: https://www.socialsuriname.com/listing/kwana-eiland.html

Kwana Island (Dutch: Kwana Eiland) is the name of an island in the southwestern part of Brokopondo Lake or Brokopondo Reservoir (Brokopondostuwmeer, also formerly known as Blommestein Lake or B. reservoir) in the District of Brokopondo (Brokopondo-district) the second largest in the nation located east of their territory. The name "Kwana" is derived from a local fish species, has palm trees, some tourist cabins and white sand beaches, is also frequented by fishermen. The island has become a holiday resort.

== See also ==
- Brokopondo Reservoir
- Brokopondo District
