= Frederick Crossfield Happold =

DSO, LLD, MA Frederick Crossfield Happold
- Born: February 15, 1893; Scotforth, Lancashire, England
- Died: 1971 (aged 77–78)
- Military career
- Allegiance: United Kingdom
- Branch: British Army; Royal Air Force

Frederick Crossfield Happold, DSO, LLD, MA (1893–1971) was an educational pioneer, tenured headmaster, author and decorated British army officer.

== Early life and First World War ==
Born the son of a butcher in Scotforth, Lancashire the family nevertheless had domestic servants (his namesake grandfather having died the same year, leaving £18,700 – £1million in 2011 prices). He attended Lancaster Royal Grammar School and Rydal Penrhos boarding school in North Wales. He matriculated as an undergraduate into Peterhouse, Cambridge, where he was a member of the Officer Training Corps. On 18 December 1914 he was gazetted as a temporary second lieutenant from the OTC into the Loyal Regiment (North Lancashire)

Although intended to be an award for the rank of Major and above, Happold was awarded the Distinguished Service Order (DSO) in June 1916 while a second lieutenant (signifying he had narrowly missed a Victoria Cross). The citation, for his actions during the Battle of Vimy Ridge, read:

Temp. 2nd Lt. Frederick Crossfield Happold 9th Bn., N. Lan. R.

For conspicuous gallantry. When the enemy exploded a mine, he at once collected a few men, rushed up and out-bombed a far larger force of the enemy in the crater until reinforcements arrived. After being wounded he continued to lead and encourage his party.

== Career as a teacher and educationalist ==
After the war he taught at the Perse School, Cambridge (while remaining in the Territorial Army (TA) as a captain) from 1922 to 1928. It was here he started writing for public consumption with the publication of Two plays from the Perse School.

He was then appointed Headmaster at Bishop Wordsworth's School, Salisbury in 1928 and married his wife Dorothy in the city in 1933. In 1936, their son David was born, who became a notable mammalogist. Frederick Happold was to remain as Headmaster of the school until his retirement in 1960.

Regarding one of Happold's innovative educational techniques – the Company of Service and Honour – intended to improve his pupils' understanding of the community, Father Kenelm Foster O.P. wrote "[the Company is] a sort of modernist Grail (for Boys) or Solidarity which Dr Happold founded in 1935 at Bishop Wordsworth's School, Salisbury. This is his nucleus, his 'order', his new aristocracy, which is to permeate England: a little cohort of leaders, of seers, of doers." (Cited in Happold, 1964, pp. 33). He sailed to Australia where he was awarded an honorary LLD by the University of Melbourne in 1937 for his pioneering work and publications on education. A year previously he oversaw the school becoming a public school and joining the Headmasters' and Headmistresses' Conference.

In April 1941, two months after its foundation during the Second World War, Happold was commissioned into the Training Branch of the Royal Air Force as a Pilot Officer, a role he would fulfil for 5 years.

In keeping with his interest in educational techniques he was a founding member of the New Education Fellowship (now called the World Education Fellowship). He strongly advocated source-based history study and the Oxford Local Examinations amended their History 'O' Level syllabus to include source-based exam questions.

During his time at BWS and in his retirement he wrote many books (often through publishers Penguin and Faber) on education and religion, the latter, what he called his 'Mystical Trilogy published 1963 to 1971', becoming staples of undergraduate theology reading lists.

He died in Salisbury, Wiltshire in 1971.

== Bibliography ==
- Dramatic Teaching in Schools
- The approach to history (1928)
- This modern age: an introduction to the understanding of our own times (1943)
- The Making of England (From 55 BC to 1485 AD) (1944)
- This Modern Age (1938)
- Towards a new aristocracy: a contribution to (1943)
- Vision and craftsmanship: studies in ends and means in education (1949)
- The adventure of man (1949)
- Citizens in the making (1950)
- Bishop Wordsworth's School 1890-1950 (1950)
- Adventure in search of a creed (1957)
- Everyone's book about the English Church (1963)
- The Mystical Trilogy
- Mysticism; a study and an anthology (1963,1964,1970)
- Religious Faith and Twentieth Century Man (1966)
- Prayer and Meditation - Their Nature and Practice (1971)

- The Journey Inwards: a simple introduction to the practice of contemplative meditation by normal people (1968)
- The English subject synthesis: its theory and practice (1981)
