= Oath of Allegiance (Australia) =

In Australia, an oath of allegiance or an affirmation of allegiance is an oath of allegiance required to be made to the monarch of Australia in some situations. Oaths of allegiance are usually made on a Bible, or some other book holy to the person, such as a Torah or Quran; but the person may opt to make an affirmation in lieu of an oath. This oath is not the same as the Australian Citizenship Pledge which is required to be made when being naturalised as an Australian citizen.

== Oath or affirmation of allegiance ==
All members of the Australian Parliament are required to make, before taking their seat in Parliament, an oath or affirmation of allegiance before the Governor-General of Australia or a person appointed by them. The requirement to take the oath is set out in section 42 of the Australian Constitution and the wording of the oath and affirmation are set out in the schedule to the Constitution.

The oath is:

I, A.B., do swear that I will be faithful and bear true allegiance to [His Majesty King Charles the Third, His] heirs and successors according to law. SO HELP ME GOD!

The affirmation is:

I, A.B., do solemnly and sincerely affirm and declare that I will be faithful and bear true allegiance to [His Majesty King Charles the Third, His] heirs and successors according to law.

where A.B. is the name of the parliamentarian.

== Oath or affirmation of office ==
=== Governor-general ===
Upon taking office, a governor-general-designate is required under the letters-patent of the office to take the above oath or affirmation of allegiance as well as a separate oath or affirmation of office, in the presence of the chief justice or another justice of the High Court. The current form of the affirmation of office as taken by Sam Mostyn is,

I, (name), do solemnly and sincerely affirm and declare that I will well and truly serve His Majesty King Charles the Third, His heirs and successors according to law, in the office of Governor‑General of the Commonwealth of Australia, and I will do right to all manner of people after the laws and usages of the Commonwealth of Australia, without fear or favour, affection or ill will.

=== Prime minister, ministers and parliamentary secretaries ===
In addition to swearing the oath or affirmation of allegiance upon becoming a parliamentarian, the prime minister, ministers and parliamentary secretaries also recite an oath or affirmation of office upon entering office. The wording of this oath or affirmation is not prescribed within the constitution and is ultimately determined by the prime minister of the day. Traditionally, the oath or affirmation has repeated the swearing of allegiance to the sovereign, although this is not required and every Labor prime minister since Paul Keating has not done so. The affirmation of office below recited by Anthony Albanese was notable for not mentioning God or the monarch:

I, (NAME) do solemnly and sincerely affirm and declare that I will well and truly serve the Commonwealth of Australia, her land and her people in the office of Prime Minister.

== Armed forces ==
The oath taken by a member of the navy, army or air force is:

I, (name), swear that I will well and truly serve His Majesty King Charles the Third, His Heirs and Successors according to law, as a member of the (insert Royal Australian Navy, Australian Army, or Royal Australian Air Force) ... and that I will resist his enemies and faithfully discharge my duty according to law. SO HELP ME GOD!

The affirmation:

I, (name), promise that I will well and truly serve His Majesty King Charles the Third, His Heirs and Successors according to law, as a member of the (insert Royal Australian Navy, Australian Army, or Royal Australian Air Force) ... and that I will resist his enemies and faithfully discharge my duty according to law.

== Australian citizenship ==
=== Pledge of Commitment for citizenship ===
The wording of the oath or affirmation of allegiance taken by newly naturalising Australian citizens has changed over time. Australian nationality was created by the Nationality and Citizenship Act 1948, which came into effect on 26 January 1949. British subjects could become Australian citizens after one year's residence in Australia as an immigrant by registration, and there was no requirement to attend a citizenship ceremony or take an oath of allegiance. Non-British subjects, on the other hand, were required to apply for naturalization, which had stricter requirements, including a five-year residency. They were required to attend a citizenship ceremony and swear an oath of allegiance, which was:

I, A. B; swear by Almighty God that I will be faithful and bear true allegiance to His Majesty King George the Sixth, his heirs and successors according to law, and that I will faithfully observe the laws of Australia and fulfil my duties as an Australian citizen.

In 1966, the Holt government added the clause "renouncing all other allegiance" to the oath, though there was no requirement for new citizens to formally take steps under the law of their former country to renounce the previous citizenship. In 1973, the Whitlam government ended the preferential treatment for British subjects from 1 December 1973 and inserted a reference to the "Queen of Australia", to become:

I, A. B., renouncing all other allegiance, swear by Almighty God that I will be faithful and bear true allegiance to Her Majesty Elizabeth the Second, Queen of Australia, Her heirs and successors according to law, and that I will faithfully observe the laws of Australia and fulfil my duties as an Australian citizen.

In 1986, the Hawke government removed the renunciation requirement and the requirement for candidates to state their names, the wording becoming:

I swear by Almighty God that I will be faithful and bear true allegiance to Her Majesty Elizabeth the Second, Queen of Australia, Her heirs and successors according to law, and that I will faithfully observe the laws of Australia and fulfil my duties as an Australian citizen.

In 1994, Parliament passed a bill introduced by the Cabinet headed by Paul Keating and which replaced the oath with a Pledge of Commitment to "Australia":

From this time forward, [under God,]
I pledge my loyalty to Australia and its people,
whose democratic beliefs I share,
whose rights and liberties I respect, and
whose laws I will uphold and obey.

The prospective citizen has the option of making the pledge with or without the words "under God".

The pledge differs from the oath, as the former is "the [thing] one swears by", while the latter is a "[promise] to which one binds oneself in swearing by things".

=== Australian Citizenship Affirmation ===
There is also a variant known as the Australian Citizenship Affirmation that was first recited at Galston Park in NSW on Australia Day 1999 that reads:

As an Australian citizen,
I affirm my loyalty to Australia and its people,
Whose democratic beliefs I share,
Whose rights and liberties I respect,
And whose laws I uphold and obey.

The Department of Home Affairs encourages use of this affirmation by school students and members of the general public including on such occasions as Harmony Day (21 March), Refugee Week, Australian Citizenship Day (17 September) and Australia Day (26 January).

== Debate of broadening pledge of allegiance ==
In February 2018, Peter Dutton, then Minister for Home Affairs, said he supports Australian school kids taking the pledge of allegiance in schools just like immigrants.

In January 2020, then-Shadow Minister for Education Tanya Plibersek called for school children to learn the Australian citizenship pledge at school.

== Religious books ==
When a member of parliament chooses to recite the oath, they often will swear-in on a religious book. Usually, this book is the Bible, but others have been used before by members of other religions. Those who do not follow a religion may choose to instead recite the affirmation.

The first Australian Muslim to be sworn in under the Quran was Ed Husic, a Labor MP, in 2013, which was met with some backlash and Islamophobic abuse on Facebook. In 2022, when Labor returned to government following their victory at the federal election, Husic was again sworn in on the Quran.

== States ==
Australia is a federated country, meaning that each state has their provisions regarding oaths and affirmations of allegiance and office.

=== Victoria ===
The Constitution of Victoria requires that the governor, lieutenant-governor, administrator and state parliamentarians make an oath or affirmation of allegiance before entering into their duties.

I swear by Almighty God[or "I do solemnly and sincerely affirm"] that I will be faithful and bear true allegiance to His Majesty and His Majesty's heirs and successors according to law.

In addition to swearing the oath or affirmation of allegiance upon becoming a parliamentarian, the premier, ministers and parliamentary secretaries also recite an oath or affirmation of office upon entering office.

I (name of deponent) swear by almighty God that as (name of office) in the State of Victoria, I will at all times and in all things discharge the duties of (name of office) according to law and to the best of my knowledge and ability without fear, favour or affection.
