= Australian nationality law =

Australian Citizenship Act 2007

Parliament of Australia
- Long title: An Act relating to Australian citizenship
- Citation: No. 20 of 2007
- Enacted by: House of Representatives
- Enacted: 1 March 2007 (agreed to Senate amendments)
- Enacted by: Senate
- Enacted: 26 February 2007
- Assented to by: Governor-General Michael Jeffery
- Royal assent: 15 March 2007
- Commenced: 1 July 2007
- Administered by: Department of Home Affairs

Legislative history

Initiating chamber: House of Representatives
- Bill title: Australian Citizenship Bill 2005
- Introduced by: John Cobb
- First reading: 9 November 2005
- Second reading: 28 November 2006
- Third reading: 28 November 2006

Revising chamber: Senate
- Bill title: Australian Citizenship Bill 2006
- Member(s) in charge: Ian Campbell, Minister for the Environment and Heritage
- First reading: 30 November 2006
- Second reading: 26 February 2007
- Third reading: 26 February 2007

Repeals
- Australian Citizenship Act 1948
- Status: Amended

The primary law governing nationality of Australia is the Australian Citizenship Act 2007, which came into force on 1 July 2007 and is applicable in all states and territories of Australia.

All persons born in Australia before 20 August 1986 were automatically citizens at birth regardless of the nationalities of their parents. Individuals born in the country after that date receive Australian citizenship at birth if at least one of their parents is an Australian citizen or permanent resident. Children born in Australia to New Zealand citizens since 1 July 2022 also receive Australian citizenship at birth. Foreign nationals may be granted citizenship after living in the country for at least four years, holding permanent residency for one year, and showing proficiency in the English language.

Australia is composed of several former British colonies founded in the 18th and 19th centuries, whose residents were British subjects. After federation as a Dominion of the British Empire in 1901, Australia was granted more autonomy over time and gradually became an independent sovereign state. Although Australian citizens ceased to be regarded as British subjects in 1984, they remain Commonwealth citizens under British law. When residing in the United Kingdom, Australians are eligible to vote in UK elections and serve in public office there.

== Terminology ==
The distinction between the meaning of the terms citizenship and nationality is not always clear in the English language and differs by country. Generally, nationality refers to a person's legal belonging to a state and is the common term used in international treaties when referring to members of that polity; citizenship refers to the set of rights and duties a person has in that nation. Despite this distinction, the Australian Government uses these two terms interchangeably.

== Colonial-era history ==
=== Fragmented development ===
The Kingdom of Great Britain established its first colony in Australia with the founding of New South Wales in 1788. Over the course of the 19th century, the British presence expanded throughout the continent. By 1890, there were six separate self-governing territories in Australia. British nationality law applied to each of these colonies, as was the case elsewhere in the British Empire. Australians and all other imperial citizens were British subjects; any person born in the Australian colonies, the United Kingdom, or anywhere else within Crown dominions was a natural-born British subject. Aboriginal Australians and Torres Strait Islanders became British subjects as the colonies were settled throughout the continent.

British nationality law during this time was uncodified and did not have a standard set of regulations, relying instead on precedent and common law. Until the mid-19th century, it was unclear whether rules for naturalisation in the United Kingdom were applicable in other parts of the Empire. Colonies had wide discretion in developing their own procedures and requirements for admitting foreign settlers as subjects. New South Wales and Tasmania respectively enacted legislation in 1828 and 1834 enabling denization, a process that partially granted foreign citizens the rights of British subjects, most notably property rights. Denizens were not considered aliens, but could not pass subject status to their children by descent and were barred from Crown service and public office.

Naturalisation in Britain was achieved through individual Acts of Parliament until 1844, when a more streamlined administrative process was introduced. The Australian colonies emulated this system in their own naturalisation legislation, which every jurisdiction had adopted by 1871. In 1847, the Imperial Parliament formalised a clear distinction between subjects who naturalised in the UK and those who did so in other territories. Individuals who naturalised in the UK were deemed to have received the status by imperial naturalisation, which was valid throughout the Empire. Those naturalising in colonies were said to have gone through local naturalisation and were given subject status valid only within the relevant territory; a subject who locally naturalised in New South Wales was a British subject there, but not in the UK or Victoria. Nevertheless, British subjects who were locally naturalised in a colony were still entitled to imperial protection when travelling outside of the Empire.

Married women generally followed the nationality status of their husbands. Beginning with New South Wales in 1848, each colony enacted legislation that automatically naturalised foreign women who married British subjects, mirroring regulations enacted in the UK in 1844. After Britain established marital denaturalisation for British subject women who married non-British men in 1870, New South Wales adapted its rules to match this in 1875. The other Australian colonies did not adopt this in legislation but in practice, women who married foreign men were automatically stripped of British subject status throughout Australia.

The Federal Council of Australasia, created in 1885, was a first attempt at forming a unified governing body in the region and consisted of four Australian colonies (Queensland, Tasmania, Victoria, and Western Australia), along with Fiji. Legislation passed by the Federal Council in 1897 allowed British subjects who had naturalised in a colony under its authority to be considered as naturalised in other such colonies.

==== Discriminatory policies against non-European migrants ====
Regulations regarding non-European migrants varied by colony but clearly favoured immigrants of European descent over members of any other ethnic groups. Queensland created two different sets of requirements in 1867 for naturalisation of "Asiatic and African aliens" and "European and North American aliens". Asian and African applicants seeking to become subjects were required to have lived in the colony for three years, and be married and living together with their wives. Chinese migrants were specifically targeted in colonial legislation that charged fees for entry to or residence in the colonies, and banned them from naturalising as British subjects. In 1889, entrance fees for Chinese in each of the Australasian colonies were standardised at £10; the exception was Queensland, which required £30.

== Post-federation policies ==
The Commonwealth of Australia was established on 1 January 1901, federating the six Australian colonies into a single union and replacing the Federal Council of Australasia, which was abolished in the previous year. The status of Australians as British subjects (including Indigenous Australians) remained unchanged despite the creation of this union. Commonwealth nationality legislation enacted in 1903 superseded laws of the new states; naturalisation in one of the states became automatically valid in all of them.

The federal government continued and extended restrictions on persons of non-European descent as part of its White Australia policy. The Immigration Restriction Act 1901 created the legal basis for administering dictation tests in any European language as determined by an immigration officer. Any person who failed was denied entry into Australia. While Māori from New Zealand technically fell under the exclusion criteria of this Act, the New Zealand government pressured the Commonwealth government into exceptionally relaxing restrictions for Māori. The Naturalization Act 1903 explicitly prohibited naturalisation of anyone with ancestry from Africa, Asia, or Oceania (except New Zealand).

=== Imperial common code ===
The Imperial Parliament brought regulations for British subject status into codified statute law for the first time with passage of the British Nationality and Status of Aliens Act 1914. British subject status was standardised as a common nationality across the Empire. Dominions that adopted this Act as part of local legislation were authorised to grant subject status to aliens by imperial naturalisation. Australia adopted the common code in 1920.

The 1914 regulations codified the doctrine of coverture into imperial nationality law, where a woman's consent to marry a foreigner was also assumed to be intent to denaturalise; British women who married foreign men automatically lost their British nationality. There were two exceptions to this: a wife married to a husband who lost his British subject status was able to retain British nationality by declaration, and a British-born widow or divorcée who had lost her British nationality through marriage could reacquire that status without meeting residence requirements after the dissolution of her marriage. Minor children whose parents voluntarily lost British subject status by renunciation or acquisition of a foreign nationality were considered to have automatically lost British nationality as well, but could resume their status as British subjects by declaration within one year of reaching age 21.

Australia's version of the common code regulations contained extensive measures for revoking British subject status from naturalised persons. Individuals who showed disloyalty to the monarch, were sentenced to imprisonment for at least one year or received a fine of more than £100 within five years of naturalising, had been deemed to be "not of good character" when subject status was granted, or lived outside of the British Empire for more than seven years were liable to have their naturalisation revoked.

Unlike the 1903 Act, the common code enacted in 1920 did not explicitly bar migrants on the basis of race. It instead allowed the government to deny naturalisation to any person without cause. Only 45 people of Asian descent were naturalised between 1904 and 1953. Migrants of non-European ancestry were effectively barred from permanent residency and naturalisation until 1957.

By the end of the First World War, the Dominions had exercised increasing levels of autonomy in managing their own affairs and each by then had developed a distinct national identity. Britain formally recognised this at the 1926 Imperial Conference, jointly issuing the Balfour Declaration with all the Dominion heads of government, which stated that the United Kingdom and Dominions were autonomous and equal to each other within the British Commonwealth of Nations. Full legislative independence was granted to the Dominions with passage of the Statute of Westminster 1931.

Women's rights groups throughout the Empire pressured the imperial government during this time to amend nationality regulations that tied a married woman's status to that of her husband. Because the British government could no longer enforce legislative supremacy over the Dominions after 1931 and wanted to maintain a strong constitutional link to them through the common nationality code, it was unwilling to make major changes without unanimous agreement among the Dominions on this issue, which it did not have. Legislative reform in 1936 allowed women in Australia denaturalised by marriage to retain their rights as British subjects, following a similar change enacted by New Zealand in the previous year and eroding imperial legal uniformity in that regard. Ireland also amended its laws in 1935 to cause no change to a woman's nationality after her marriage and Canada permitted women who had not acquired foreign nationality on marriage to retain their British nationality beginning in 1932.

=== Australian citizenship created ===
Diverging developments in Dominion legislation, as well as growing assertions of local national identity separate from that of Britain and the Empire, culminated with the creation of a substantive Canadian citizenship in 1946, breaking the system of a common imperial nationality. Combined with the approaching independence of India and Pakistan in 1947, comprehensive reform to imperial nationality law was necessary at this point to address ideas that were incompatible with the previous system. The Dominion governments agreed on the principle of equal standing for women in a reformed nationality system at the 1946 Commonwealth Prime Ministers' Conference and Australia amended its law to grant equal nationality rights in that same year.

Australia enacted the Nationality and Citizenship Act 1948 to create its own citizenship, which came into force on 26 January 1949, shortly after the British Nationality Act 1948 became effective throughout the Empire on 1 January 1949. All British subjects who were born, naturalised, or resident for at least five years in Australia automatically acquired Australian citizenship on that date. British subjects born to a father who himself was born or naturalised in Australia and British subject women who were married to someone qualifying as an Australian citizen also automatically acquired citizenship on that date.

All other noncitizens could acquire citizenship by naturalisation after fulfilling a general residence requirement. Candidates must have resided in Australia (including Papua) or New Guinea for at least four of the previous eight years, with one year of continuous residence immediately preceding an application. This was reduced to two of the previous eight years in 1973. Non-Europeans were allowed to apply for residency and naturalisation from 1957, if they were legally admitted and living in Australia for 15 years (reduced to five years in 1966).

Almost all provisions to revoke citizenship from naturalised individuals were repealed in 1958. On the other hand, Australian citizens who acquired a foreign citizenship other than through marriage were automatically denaturalised and lost their Australian citizenship under this Act. Individuals who naturalised as Australian citizens conversely were not required to renounce their previous nationalities.

=== Reform and abolition of British subject status ===
The 1948 Act redefined the term British subject as any citizen of Australia or another Commonwealth country. Commonwealth citizen is defined in this Act to have the same meaning. British subject/Commonwealth citizen status co-existed with the citizenships of each Commonwealth country. Irish citizens were treated as if they were British subjects, despite Ireland's exit from the Commonwealth in 1949. All Commonwealth citizens were eligible to become Australian citizens by registration, rather than naturalisation, after residing in Australia for at least five of the preceding seven years. Commonwealth citizens who became Australian citizens by registration were not required to swear an oath of allegiance because they were already subjects of the Crown.

All British subjects under the reformed system initially held an automatic right to settle in the United Kingdom and Ireland. Non-white immigration into the UK was systematically discouraged, but strong economic conditions in Britain following the Second World War attracted an unprecedented wave of colonial migration. In response, the British Parliament imposed immigration controls on any subjects originating from outside the British Islands with the Commonwealth Immigrants Act 1962. Ireland had continued to allow all British subjects free movement despite independence in 1922 as part of the Common Travel Area arrangement, but moved to mirror Britain's restriction in 1962 by limiting this ability only to people born on the British Isles. Britain somewhat relaxed these measures in 1971 for patrials, subjects whose parents or grandparents were born in the United Kingdom, which gave effective preferential treatment to white Commonwealth citizens.

As a sign of Australia's changing relationship with Britain, Australian passports were no longer labelled with the phrase "British passport" beginning in 1967. Legislative changes in 1969 meant that Australian citizens technically ceased to be British subjects in that year, but retained "the status of British subjects" instead. Preferences that were afforded to citizens from other Commonwealth countries and restrictions on migrants of non-European descent were abolished in a further 1973 amendment. The name of the Nationality and Citizenship Act 1948 itself changed to the Australian Citizenship Act 1948 in 1973 as well; the anniversary of this event has been celebrated since 2001 as Australian Citizenship Day.

By the 1970s and 1980s, most colonies of the British Empire had become independent and remaining ties to the United Kingdom had been significantly weakened. The UK itself updated its nationality law to reflect the more modest boundaries of its remaining territory and possessions with the British Nationality Act 1981, which redefined British subject to no longer also mean Commonwealth citizen. Australian citizens remain Commonwealth citizens in British law and are still eligible to vote and stand for public office in the UK.

Further reforms in 1984 fully abolished British subject status in Australian law and removed remaining gender imbalances in nationality regulations. Voting eligibility rules were changed to require Australian citizenship instead of British subject status, but any British subject without citizenship already enrolled to vote before 26 January 1984 had the right to continue participating in elections. Noncitizen British subjects could no longer apply for Australian passports beginning in that year.

After passage of the Australia Act 1986, the High Court has considered any persons without Australian citizenship to be aliens. While British subjects could not have been considered foreign at the time of federation, the severing of constitutional ties with the United Kingdom created a definitive separation between the two countries; British citizens have since been considered subjects of a foreign power and are ineligible to serve in the Parliament of Australia under section 44 of the Constitution of Australia. The eligibility of 10 sitting legislators was questioned under this section of the Constitution during the 2017–18 Australian parliamentary eligibility crisis, leading to eight disqualifications under subsequent court proceedings.

=== Heightened citizenship requirements ===
The general residence requirement for acquiring citizenship was relaxed in 1984. Naturalisation candidates were required to have lived in Australia for two of the five years preceding an application, while holding permanent residency for at least one year during that aggregate period. However, concerns over an influx of unintended immigration and the perceived exploitation of nationality law by illegal migrants to gain residence in Australia created the impetus for ending unrestricted birthright citizenship in 1986. Children born in the country since then are only granted citizenship by birth if at least one parent is a citizen or permanent resident.

Naturalisation candidates have been required since 1993 to recite a citizenship pledge in which they commit their loyalty to the country of Australia, rather than swear an oath of allegiance to the Australian monarch. Automatic denaturalisation of Australians acquiring foreign nationalities was repealed in 2002. Citizenship tests were introduced in 2007 and the general residence requirement was increased back to four years as well.

Government powers for citizenship deprivation were greatly expanded in 2015. Australians holding another nationality and engaged in terrorist activities were subject to automatic loss of citizenship. These measures were amended in 2020 to require an explicit revocation order from the Minister for Home Affairs.

==== Changing regulations for New Zealand citizens ====
Migration between Australia and New Zealand has traditionally been lightly regulated. After briefly being annexed to New South Wales in 1839, New Zealand was established as a separate British colony in 1840. Security concerns during the First World War halted free movement between the two jurisdictions but this was restarted and formalised in 1920; white and Māori British subjects could live and work in both Australia and New Zealand with no restrictions. This was expanded to all Australian and New Zealand citizens and permanent residents, regardless of race, after agreement on the 1973 Trans-Tasman Travel Arrangement.

Australia introduced the Special Category Visa (SCV) in 1994, which is automatically issued to New Zealand citizens on arrival. Although these visas allow New Zealanders to reside in the country indefinitely, they do not confer a permanent status in Australia. This did not materially affect the status of New Zealanders until 2001, when holders of the SCV were no longer treated as permanent residents for welfare and citizenship purposes. New Zealand citizens who were already domiciled in Australia on 26 February 2001 retained welfare access and continued to be treated as permanent residents for citizenship. The government implemented these changes to control the costs of resident New Zealanders on social security in Australia. Although New Zealand made financial contributions to the Australian budget to offset welfare expenditures, Australia considered them to be inadequate.

Under amendments to the Migration Act 1958 in 1999, the Minister for Immigration and Citizenship has the ability to revoke visas from any noncitizen who is convicted of a crime that leads to a sentence of 12 months or longer. Further changes in 2014 expanded the scope of visa revocation; any noncitizen who received a total prison sentence of at least 12 months, including for multiple charges that carry a combined sentence of that length, would automatically have their visas revoked. The 2014 policy changes were applied retroactively, which meant that released noncitizens who had already served multiple sentences totaling 12 months or longer but never a single sentence of that length would be subject to visa cancellation and deportation.

As a consequence of the 2014 changes, the number of Australia-resident New Zealanders who had visas cancelled by the government increased dramatically. While only 77 New Zealanders had their visas revoked in 2013–2014, this had risen to 1,287 in 2016–2017. The New Zealand government reported that 60 per cent of its citizens deported by Australia were ethnically Māori or Pasifika. Since 2022, the Australian government has expanded pathways to citizenship for New Zealand citizens. Children born in Australia to New Zealand citizens are automatically Australian citizens by birth since 1 July 2022, and all New Zealand citizens have been eligible for Australian citizenship after four years of residence without first holding permanent residence since 1 July 2023.

=== Territorial changes ===
==== Papua, New Guinea, and Nauru ====
Queensland attempted to preemptively counter German colonial interests in the Pacific by annexing Papua in 1883, though this was met with disapproval from imperial authorities. Following the establishment of German New Guinea, Britain claimed Papua in 1884 and formally annexed it in 1888. After Australian federation in 1901, Britain ceded administrative control of the territory to the Commonwealth government in 1902, which was accepted by Australia in 1905. New Guinea and Nauru remained German colonies until the First World War, after which New Guinea became a League of Nations mandate under Australian control while Nauru's mandate was split between Britain, Australia, and New Zealand. In practice, Australia held sole governing authority over Nauru.

While residents of Papua became British subjects, that status was not extended to those from the mandated territories under the recommendation of the Permanent Mandates Commission. Residents of New Guinea and Nauru were instead treated as British protected persons. When Australian citizenship was created in 1949, Papuans automatically became Australian citizens while New Guinea and Nauru residents became "Australian protected persons". Despite their status as British subjects/Australian citizens, Papuans of indigenous descent did not have an automatic right to reside in mainland Australia and were required to apply for that separately. Persons with non-indigenous ancestry held that right automatically.

Papua New Guinea became independent in 1975. Indigenous residents born in Papua or New Guinea with two grandparents also born in either territory or surrounding area, who did not have right of residence in mainland Australia, and did not hold foreign nationality automatically became citizens of the new country. Former Australian citizens born in Papua before independence seeking to resume citizenship cannot reacquire that status by descent. Because Papua fell within the definition of "Australia" before 1975, applicants cannot claim citizenship through their birth overseas. Since 2007, Papua New Guinean citizens who lost Australian citizenship on independence but have a parent born on the Australian mainland can apply for a special resumption of citizenship.

==== Indian Ocean territories ====
The Cocos (Keeling) Islands and Christmas Island were respectively annexed into the Empire in 1857 and 1888. The Cocos Islands were first directly administered by the UK until 1878, when it was transferred to Ceylon, then to the Straits Settlements in 1886, and finally devolved to the settlement of Singapore in 1903. Christmas Island was similarly incorporated into Singapore in 1900. Following the Second World War, the Australian government expressed its interest in acquiring both territories for strategic and commercial reasons; the Cocos Islands for its airstrip and Christmas Island for its phosphate. Sovereignty over the Cocos Islands was transferred to Australia in 1955. Island residents became Australian citizens at time of transfer while retaining UK citizenship. Christmas Island was transferred to Australia in 1958 under largely the same terms. Citizens from these territories did not have automatic right of residence on the Australian mainland, as was the case with citizens from Papua, until this restriction was repealed in 1984. No Australian citizen has been required to obtain an entry permit to enter the country since that year.

==== Burmese independence ====
Burma gained independence from the United Kingdom on 4 January 1948. The British Parliament enacted the Burma Independence Act 1947 to remove British subject status from all individuals who held that status solely through their connection with Burma. Burmese resident in the UK or its colonies could make formal claims to retain subject status.

The Australian Parliament did not pass similar legislation addressing this event, leaving only common law to apply. Australian common law at the time dictated that only Burmese resident in Burma at the time of independence lost British nationality, while every Burmese person who left Burma permanently before its independence or "within a reasonable time thereafter" retained British subject status. This created an anomalous situation where Burmese living in Australia ceased to be British subjects under UK law, but continued that status in Australian law.

The Nationality and Citizenship (Burmese) Act 1950 addressed this discrepancy, removing British subject status from persons connected with Burma. Individuals who lost subject status through this Act but had become Australian citizens in 1949 could retain their citizenship by making formal declarations within two years of the Act's passage.

== Acquisition and loss of citizenship ==
=== Entitlement by birth, descent, or adoption ===
All persons born in Australia before 20 August 1986 automatically received citizenship at birth regardless of the nationalities of their parents. Individuals born in the country since that date receive Australian citizenship at birth if at least one parent is a citizen or permanent resident. Children born in Australia to New Zealand citizens since 1 July 2022 also receive Australian citizenship at birth.

A person born outside Australia to an Australian citizen parent is eligible to acquire Australian citizenship by descent through application. If the parent acquired citizenship by descent or adoption, the parent must have resided in Australia for at least two years at the time of application.

Adopted children are treated as if they were naturally born to the adopting parents at the time and location of adoption; those adopted in Australia automatically receive citizenship, while those adopted overseas are eligible to apply. Children who are born in Australia but did not acquire citizenship at birth may otherwise automatically acquire citizenship if they are ordinarily resident in the country for the 10-year period immediately following their birth. Stateless children born in the country are entitled to citizenship without further residence requirements.

=== Voluntary acquisition ===
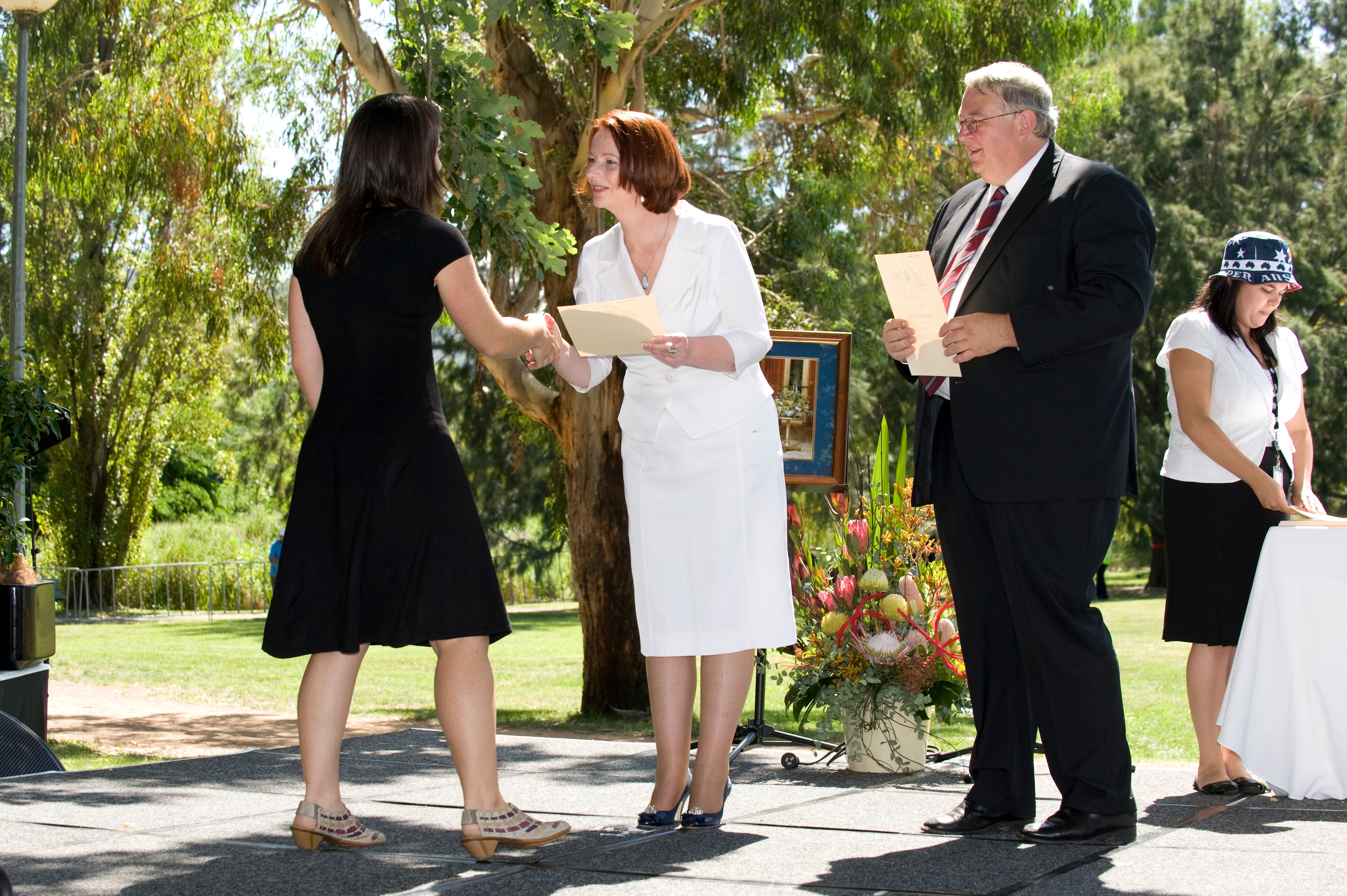
Prime Minister Julia Gillard and Secretary of the Department of Immigration and Citizenship Andrew Metcalfe with a new citizen at a 2011 citizenship ceremony

Noncitizens over the age of 18 may become Australian citizens by conferral after legally residing in the country for more than four years and holding permanent residency for at least 12 months. Applicants must not have been outside of Australia for longer than 12 months in the preceding four years, with absences totaling less than 90 days in the final year. Candidates who are overseas while enlisted in the Australian Defence Force, deemed to be engaged in activities for Australia's benefit, or employed in a position that requires regular travel abroad can be considered to have fulfilled special residence requirements. Members of the Australian Commonwealth Games team and holders of distinguished talent visas have also been eligible for special residence considerations since 2021.

Applicants between the ages of 18 and 59 must complete a citizenship test in which they demonstrate basic competency in the English language as well as sufficient knowledge of the country and citizenship. Successful candidates aged 16 and older are required to make a citizenship pledge in which they commit their loyalty to the country of Australia; these are usually administered by local government at citizenship ceremonies that take place about six months after approval. Between 1 July 2020 and 30 June 2021, over 140,000 people obtained Australian citizenship by conferral.

=== Pathway for New Zealand citizens ===
New Zealand citizens are generally exempt from immigration restrictions under the Trans-Tasman Travel Arrangement and fall under unique regulations. Any New Zealander who settled in Australia on or before 26 February 2001 is automatically considered a permanent resident for nationality purposes. Between 27 February 2001 and 30 June 2023, they were required to first obtain permanent residency before they could naturalise. Since 1 July 2023, all New Zealand citizens holding a Special Category Visa (SCV) who have been resident in Australia for at least four years are no longer required to obtain permanent residency before naturalisation.

Children born in Australia to New Zealand citizens between the end of unrestricted birthright citizenship on 20 August 1986 and 31 August 1994 were "exempt non-citizens" and considered to have been permanent residents for any time spent living in the country during this period. The SCV was introduced for New Zealand citizens on 1 September 1994; all New Zealand citizens already in the country on that date were automatically granted this visa and it is issued on arrival to New Zealanders after that date. A child born in Australia between 1 September 1994 and 26 February 2001 to a New Zealand parent with an SCV or permanent visa is an Australian citizen by birth. Between 27 February 2001 and 30 June 2022, children born to New Zealand citizens in Australia only received Australian citizenship at birth if at least one parent held an SCV issued before 27 February 2001, a permanent Australian visa, or dual Australian-New Zealand citizenship. Since 1 July 2022, children born in Australia to New Zealand citizens are automatically Australian citizens by birth.

Since 1 January 2023, New Zealand citizens holding an SCV who are granted the Skilled Independent (subclass 189) permanent resident visa under the New Zealand stream are considered to have been permanent residents in Australia since 1 January 2022, making them immediately eligible for Australian citizenship by conferral without a further term of residence. Any New Zealand citizen who already held this type of visa before 2023 is also considered to have their permanent residence backdated. Children born between 1 January 2022 and 30 June 2023 to SCV holders who are later granted the subclass 189 visa between those dates retroactively acquire Australian citizenship by birth.

By 15 August 2023, over 15,000 New Zealand citizens residing in Australia had applied for Australian citizenship under the new criteria, with 500 passing the Australian citizenship test at the time of publication.

=== Loss and resumption of citizenship ===
Australian citizenship can be relinquished by making a declaration of renunciation, although this may be denied at the discretion of the Minister for Home Affairs. Citizenship may be involuntarily deprived from individuals who fraudulently acquired it, or from dual citizens who actively serve in the military of another country at war with Australia. Children of former citizens may also be stripped of citizenship, except in cases where another parent remains an Australian citizen or deprivation would cause statelessness. Dual citizens who are engaged in terrorist activities, part of a known terror group, or have been convicted of terrorism offences for imprisonment sentences totaling at least three years may also be stripped of their citizenship at the discretion of the Minister.

Until 4 April 2002, Australians who became citizens of another country automatically lost Australian citizenship; multiple citizenship has been permitted since this restriction was repealed. This restriction did not apply to those who acquired a foreign citizenship by marriage, and did not require naturalisation candidates to relinquish their former nationalities. Children born to individuals who lost their citizenship under this provision for automatic loss before 2002 are eligible for a special conferral of citizenship.

Former citizens may subsequently apply for nationality restoration, provided that they would have been subject to hardship had they not renounced Australian citizenship, or were automatically deprived of their Australian citizenship before 2002. Individuals resuming citizenship regain the same type of citizenship they held previously; a person who had acquired citizenship by descent, relinquishes it, then resumes citizenship would regain citizenship by descent. Citizens of Papua New Guinea who lost Australian citizenship on independence in 1975 but have a parent born on the Australian mainland have been able to apply for a special resumption of citizenship since 2007.

== See also ==
- Visa policy of Australia
- Visa requirements for Australian citizens
