= Australian citizenship test =

The Australian citizenship test is a test applicants for Australian citizenship who also meet the basic requirements for citizenship are required to take. In order to be able to take the test, one must be a permanent resident of Australia and one must have applied for Australian citizenship. It was introduced in 2007 to assess the applicants' adequate knowledge of Australia, the responsibilities and privileges of citizenship and basic knowledge of the English language. The format of the test was amended in 2009.

== History ==
In December 2006, it was announced that applicants for Australian citizenship who are over 18 and under 60 years old will need to pass an Australian citizenship test. The objective of the test is to prove an applicant's grasp of English language and understanding of Australia's "values", history, traditional and national symbols. Citizenship applicants are required to study a booklet produced by the Department of Immigration and Citizenship.

On 2 January 2008, it was announced that the test would be reviewed when statistics showed that over 20% of those sitting the test failed on their first attempts. On 28 April 2008 the Minister for Immigration and Citizenship, Senator Chris Evans, announced the appointment of an independent committee to conduct a review of the Australian citizenship test since its implementation on 1 October 2007. This review was commissioned to examine the operation of the citizenship test after six months experience and whether there were ways to improve its operation and effectiveness as the pathway for residents to become Australian citizens. On 22 November 2008, the Minister for Immigration and Citizenship, Chris Evans, released the Citizenship Test Review Report Moving Forward ... Improving Pathways to Citizenship and the Government's response. The report and the government's response are located online.

On 19 October 2009, changes to the citizenship test came into effect. Under the new rules, a mark of 75% (15 out of 20 questions correct) is required, participants still need to answer all 5 questions on Australian Values correctly. If one were to fail the exam but score more than 50%, they would still get two more attempts on the same day. Previously, a mark of 60% plus answering three mandatory questions correctly was required. Applicants will need to pass in order for a decision on their citizenship application to proceed, i.e. the application must be lodged before the test takes place.

== Test format ==
The computer-based test consists of 20 multiple choice questions drawn randomly from a pool of 200 confidential questions. The test is only available in English. Applicants have 45 minutes to complete the test. To pass the test one must:

- answer 20 multiple choice questions
- answer all 5 of the Australian values questions correctly, and
- get a mark of at least 75% overall.

The material is drawn from the official guide "Our common bond" published by the Australian Government Department of Immigration and Citizenship (DIAC). To find Australian values questions, one can search for practice tests here.

Scheduling a time to take the test can be done by the DIAC. Wait times vary widely, and applicants may need to wait a considerable amount of time. As of 17 February 2009, one would need to wait almost four months to secure an appointment in central Sydney and over three months in Parramatta. In less congested areas, wait times are considerably less, if any; in Adelaide, for instance, an applicant needs to make an appointment online or by paper application to Adelaide DIAC office anytime.

=== Questions and answers ===
Although the following are not necessarily correct answers, they are answers expected to pass the test.

- Which one of these is a responsibility for every Australian citizen? (Join with Australians to defend Australia and its way of life, should the need arise)
- Which one of these values is important in modern Australia? (Everyone has equality of opportunity)
- What is Australia's national floral emblem? (The golden wattle)
- What is a Bill? (A proposed law that has not yet passed through Parliament - either at Commonwealth or State Parliament level)
- In what year did Federation take place? (1901)
- Which day of the year is Australia Day? (26 January)
- What is the first line of Australia's national anthem? ("Australians all let us rejoice")
- What is the population of Australia? (approx 28 million)
- In what city is the Parliament House of the Commonwealth Parliament located? (Canberra)
- Who is the King's representative in Australia? (the Governor-General of Australia)
- How are Members of Parliament chosen? (by election)
- Who do Members of Parliament represent? (the people of their electorate)
- After a federal election, who forms the new government? (the political party or coalition of parties which wins a majority of seats in the House of Representatives)
- What are the colours on the Australian flag? (red, white and blue)
- Who is the head of the Australian Government? (the prime minister)
- What are the three levels of government in Australia? (Commonwealth, State or Territory and local)
- In what year did the European settlement of Australia start? (1788)
- Serving on a jury if required is a responsibility of Australian citizenship: true or false? (true)
- In Australia, everyone is free to practise the religion of their choice, or practise no religion: true or false? (true)
- To be elected to the Commonwealth Parliament you must be an Australian citizen: true or false? (true)
- As an Australian citizen, I have the right to register my baby born overseas as an Australian citizen: true or false? (true)
- Australian citizens aged 18 years or over are required to enroll on the electoral register: true or false? (true)
- What do we remember on Anzac Day? (The landing of the Australian and New Zealand Army Corps at Gallipoli, Turkey)
- What are the colours of the Australian Aboriginal Flag? (Black, red and yellow)
- Which official symbol of Australia identifies Commonwealth property? (Commonwealth Coat of Arms)
- Which of these statements about Australia's system of government is correct? (The government is elected by the people)
- Which of these is an example of freedom of speech? (People can peacefully protest against government decisions)
- Which of these statements about government in Australia is correct? (Government in Australia is secular)
- Which of these is an example of equality in Australia? (Men and women have the same rights)
- Which of these is a responsibility of Australian citizens aged 18 years or over? (To vote in elections)
- Which of these is a responsibility of Australian citizens aged 18 years or over? (To serve on a jury if called to do so)
- Which of these statements about passports is correct? (Australian citizens can apply for an Australian passport)
- Which of these is a role of the Governor-General? (The signing of Bills passed by the Australian Parliament by way of Royal Assent)
- Which of these statements about state governments is correct? (Each state has its own constitution)
- What is the name given to the party or coalition of parties with the second largest number of members in the House of Representatives? (The Opposition)
- What is the name of a proposal to make a law in parliament? (Bill)
- Who maintains peace and order in Australia? (Police)
- How many members of the House of Representatives are there? (150)
- The power of the Australian government comes from? (The Governor General)
- What does the term "mateship" mean in Australian culture? ("Mateship" refers to a strong bond of friendship, support, and solidarity among Australians.)
- Who is the head of the State? (The King, Charles III)

== See also ==
- Character test under Migration Act 1958
