= Oath of citizenship =

Oath taken by immigrants for naturalization

An oath of citizenship is an oath taken by immigrants that officially naturalizes immigrants into citizens. It is often the final step in this process, and is usually done in a ceremonial capacity. An oath of citizenship is designed to be a statement of patriotism and loyalty to the new country. In countries which retain a monarchical system of government, an oath of allegiance to the monarch is often required as well. Adding an oath to God to the end of an oath is usually optional.

== Oaths ==
=== Belgium ===
Dutch version:

"Ik verklaar Belgisch staatsburger te willen worden en de Grondwet, de wetten van het Belgische volk en het Verdrag tot bescherming van de rechten van de mens en de fundamentele vrijheden te zullen naleven."

French version:

“Je déclare vouloir acquérir la nationalité belge et me soumettre à la Constitution, aux lois du peuple belge et à la Convention de sauvegarde des droits de l’homme et des libertés fondamentales.”

The English translation:

“I declare my desire to acquire the Belgian nationality and to submit myself to the Constitution, the laws of Belgium, and to the Convention for the Protection of Human Rights and Fundamental Freedoms.”

=== Brazil ===
Portuguese version:

Declaro expressamente que assumo o compromisso de bem cumprir os deveres de cidadão brasileiro, observando e respeitando os preceitos da Constituição Federal.

The English translation:

I expressly declare that I assume the commitment to well comply the Brazilian citizen duties, observing and respecting the principles of the Federal Constitution.

=== Canada ===
The Oath of Citizenship, or Citizenship Oath (in French: serment de citoyenneté), is a statement recited and signed by candidates who wish to become citizens of Canada. Administered at a ceremony presided over by assigned officers, most often a citizenship judge. The oath is a promise or declaration of fealty to Canada in the name of the Canadian monarch and a promise to abide by Canada's laws and customs; upon signing the oath, citizenship is granted to the signer. New citizens must take the oath. As Canada is officially bilingual in English and French, the presiding official leads new citizens in both languages at citizenship ceremonies. It is mandatory that the presiding official and/or the citizenship officials observe each applicant reciting the oath.

English version:

I swear (or affirm) that I will be faithful and bear true allegiance to His Majesty King Charles the Third, King of Canada, His Heirs and Successors, and that I will faithfully observe the laws of Canada, including the Constitution, which recognizes and affirms the Aboriginal and treaty rights of First Nations, Inuit and Métis peoples, and fulfil my duties as a Canadian citizen.

French version:

Je jure (ou j'affirme solennellement) que je serai fidèle et porterai sincère allégeance à Sa Majesté le Roi Charles Trois, Roi du Canada, à ses héritiers et successeurs, que j'observerai fidèlement les lois du Canada, y compris la Constitution, qui reconnaît et confirme les droits ancestraux ou issus de traités des Premières Nations, des Inuits et des Métis, et que je remplirai loyalement mes obligations de citoyen canadien.

=== Colombia ===
The Colombian Oath of Allegiance (Acta de Juramento), does not have an official text. The oath is usually made before a Mayor, if the applicant was born in a Latin American country, or the Governor if the applicant was born anywhere else, and is administered in the form of a question. In special cases the oath may also be taken by the Minister of Foreign Affairs (Canciller), or the President of the Republic. An example of an oath that is given is:

Spanish Version: "Señor/Señora [inserte nombre aquí], ¿Jura usted que es de su libre voluntad ser colombiano(a) y como tal de cumplir, sostener y defender la Constitución y las leyes de la República de Colombia?"

If the applicant responds in the affirmative, the oath taker finishes the oath by saying:

"Si así lo hiciera, Dios y la patria os la premien, y si no, Él y Ella os lo(a) demanden."

English Translation: "Mr/Mrs. [Insert Name Here]: Do you swear that you freely wish to become Colombian and as such to fulfill, uphold and defend the constitution and the laws of the Republic of Colombia?"

If the applicant responds in the affirmative, the oath taker finishes the oath by saying:

"If you do so, may God and the motherland reward you, and if not, may he and she demand it from you."

=== Germany ===
According to § 16 National Act the oath of citizenship reads as follows. German version:

Ich erkläre feierlich, dass ich das Grundgesetz und die Gesetze der Bundesrepublik Deutschland achten und alles unterlassen werde, was ihr schaden könnte.

English version:

I solemnly declare that I will respect and observe the Basic Law and the laws of the Federal Republic of Germany, and that I will refrain from any activity which might cause it harm.

=== Hungary ===
Officially called the "Oath of Allegiance".

Hungarian version:

Én, [name] esküszöm, hogy Magyarországot hazámnak tekintem. Magyarországnak hű állampolgára leszek, az Alaptörvényt és a jogszabályokat tiszteletben tartom és megtartom. Hazámat erőmhöz mérten megvédem, képességeimnek megfelelően szolgálom. Isten engem úgy segéljen.

English version:

I, [name], do solemnly swear that I shall consider Hungary my homeland. I shall be a loyal citizen of the Republic of Hungary, and shall honour and observe its Constitution and laws. I shall defend my homeland in function with my force, and shall serve it to the best of my ability. So help me God!

The "Pledge of Allegiance" is the same with the exception of "So help me God!" ["Isten engem úgy segéljen."] and is of equal value.

=== India ===
Officially called the "Oath of Allegiance":

English Version:

I, [name] do solemnly affirm (or, swear in the name of God) that I will bear true faith and allegiance to the Constitution of India as by law established, and that I will faithfully observe the laws of India and fulfil my duties as a citizen of India.

Hindi version:

मैं.....[नाम].....शपथ लेता/लेती हूँ (अथवा सत्यनिष्ठा से प्रतिज्ञान करता/करती हूँ) कि मैं भारत के संविधान के प्रति श्रद्धावान एवं सच्ची निष्ठा रखूँगा/रखूँगी, जो विधि द्वारा स्थापित है तथा भारत के नागरिक के रूप में भारत के कानूनों और अपने कर्तव्यों का निष्ठापूर्वक पालन करूँगा/करूँगी।

=== Indonesia ===
Indonesian oath of allegiance:

Saya bersumpah (atau berjanji) bahwa saya melepaskan seluruhnya, segala kesetiaan kepada kekuasaan asing, bahwa saya mengaku dan menerima kekuasaan yang tertinggi dari Republik Indonesia dan akan menepati kesetiaan kepadanya, bahwa saya akan menjunjung tinggi Undang-undang Dasar dan hukum-hukum Republik Indonesia dan akan membelanya dengan sungguh-sungguh, bahwa saya memikul kewajiban ini dengan rela hati dan tidak akan mengurangi sedikitpun.

The English Translation:

I swear (or promise) that I release all and every allegiance to foreign powers, that I acknowledge and accept the highest powers from the Republic of Indonesia and will fulfill allegiance upon them, that I will highly honor the Constitution and laws of the Republic of Indonesia and will solemnly defend them, that I assume these obligations freely and will not diminish them even a little.

=== Ireland ===
The Declaration of Fidelity to the Nation and Loyalty to the State is the final act in the naturalisation process. The declaration is as follows:

“I (name) having applied to the Minister for Justice and Equality for a certificate of naturalisation, hereby solemnly declare my fidelity to the Irish nation and my loyalty to the State. I undertake to faithfully observe the laws of the State and to respect its democratic values.”

=== Israel ===
Non-Jews who wish to become citizens by way of naturalization must take an oath reading:

"I declare that I will be a loyal national of the State of Israel."

=== Italy ===
In Italy, Article 54 of the Constitution states that every citizen has the duty to be loyal to the Republic and to uphold its Constitution and laws, while Provision XVIII requires every citizen to faithfully observe the Constitution as the fundamental law of the Republic. New citizens take an oath to that effect at the end of their naturalization process:

The oath in Italian is:

Giuro di essere fedele alla Repubblica e di osservare la Costituzione e le leggi dello Stato.

The English translation of the oath is:

I swear to be loyal to the Republic and to observe the Constitution and the laws of the State.

=== Jamaica ===
I, [name], do swear that I will be faithful and bear true allegiance to His Majesty King Charles the Third, His Heirs and Successors according to the Laws of Jamaica and that I will faithfully observe the laws of Jamaica and fulfil my duties as a citizen of Jamaica. So help me God.

=== Netherlands ===
Immigrants who have applied for Dutch citizenship by naturalization or by option must make a Declaration of Solidarity (Verklaring van verbondenheid) before they become citizens:

Ik zweer dat ik de grondwettelijke orde van het Koninkrijk der Nederlanden, haar vrijheden en rechten respecteer. En zweer de plichten die het staatsburgerschap met zich meebrengt getrouw te vervullen. Zo waarlijk helpe mij God almachtig. (Dutch)

I swear that I will respect the constitutional order of the Kingdom of the Netherlands, its liberties and rights and I swear that I will faithfully fulfill the duties which this citizenship imposes on me. So help me God.

For those who are not religious or who so choose, the following affirmation is also an option:

Ik verklaar dat ik de grondwettelijke orde van het Koninkrijk der Nederlanden, haar vrijheden en rechten respecteer. En beloof de plichten die het staatsburgerschap met zich meebrengt getrouw te vervullen. Dat verklaar en beloof ik. (Dutch)

I declare that I will respect the constitutional order of the Kingdom of the Netherlands, its liberties and rights and I declare and promise that I will faithfully fulfill the duties which this citizenship imposes on me. This I declare and promise.

=== New Zealand ===
According to New Zealand law, new citizens are given the option of taking the oath in either English or Maori when swearing in at a citizenship ceremony.

English versions:

Oath of allegiance:

I, [full name], swear that I will be faithful and bear true allegiance to His (or Her) Majesty [specify the name of the reigning Sovereign, as thus: King Charles the Third, King of New Zealand] His (or Her) heirs and successors according to law, and that I will faithfully observe the laws of New Zealand and fulfil my duties as a New Zealand citizen. So help me God.

Those who object to adding "God" to the end of an oath may take the affirmation of allegiance instead:

I [name] solemnly and sincerely affirm that I will be faithful and bear true allegiance to His (or Her) Majesty [specify the name of the reigning Sovereign, as thus: King Charles the Third, King of New Zealand] His (or Her) heirs and successors according to the law and that I will faithfully observe the laws of New Zealand and fulfil my duties as a New Zealand citizen.

Maori versions:

Oath of allegiance:

Tenei au, a [name], te oati nei ka pirihongo au, ka noho au hei haumi tuturu ki te Mana Roera, ki a Kuini Irihapeti te Tuarua, te Kuini o Aotearoa, ana kawa me ana piki turanga i raro i te ture, a, ka u marika au ki nga ture o Aotearoa, ka whakatutuki ano hoki i nga kawenga kei runga i a au hei kirirarau o Aotearoa, i runga i nga manaakitanga a te atua.

Affirmation of allegiance:

Tenei au, a [name], te whakau nei i runga i te ngakau pono, i te ngakau pai, ka pirihongo au, ka noho au hei haumi tuturu ki a Kuini Irihapeti te Tuarua, te Kuini o Aotearoa, ana kawa me ana piki turanga i raro i te ture, a, ka u marika au ki nga ture o Aotearoa, ka whakatutuki ano hoki i nga kawenga kei runga i a au hei kirirarau o Aotearoa.

=== Philippines ===
I, (name), solemnly swear (or affirm) that I will support and defend the Constitution of the Republic of the Philippines and obey the laws and legal orders promulgated by the duly constituted authorities of the Philippines and I hereby declare that I recognize and accept the supreme authority of the Philippines and will maintain true faith and allegiance thereto; and that I imposed this obligation upon myself voluntarily without mental reservation or purpose of evasion. So help me God.

=== Russia ===
Russian version:

Я, Ф. И. О., добровольно и осознанно принимая гражданство РФ, клянусь соблюдать Конституцию и законодательство РФ, права и свободы ее граждан, исполнять обязанности гражданина РФ на благо государства и общества, защищать свободу и независимость РФ, быть верным России, уважать ее культуру, историю и традиции.

The English translation:

I, (surname, name, middle name), swear that, by taking the citizenship of the Russian Federation, I will observe the Constitution and laws of the Russian Federation, and the rights and freedoms of its citizens; that I shall fulfill my duties as a citizen of the Russian Federation for the welfare of the state and society; that I will protect the freedom and independence of the Russian Federation; and that I will be loyal to Russia and respect its culture, history and traditions.

=== Singapore ===
I, [name], do solemnly swear that I will be faithful, and bear true allegiance to the Republic of Singapore, and that I will observe the laws and be a true, loyal and faithful citizen of Singapore.

=== South Africa ===
I, [name], do hereby solemnly declare that I will be loyal to the Republic of South Africa, promote all that will advance it and oppose all that may harm it, uphold and respect its Constitution and commit myself to the furtherance of the ideals and principles contained therein.

=== Switzerland ===
The oath is different in each canton. The formula below is the English translation of the one used in Geneva.

I swear or I solemnly promise: to be loyal to the Republic and the canton of Geneva as to the Swiss Confederation; to scrupulously observe the constitution and the laws; to respect the traditions, to justify my adhesion to the community of Geneva by my actions and behavior; and to contribute with all my power to keeping it free and prosperous.

=== United Kingdom ===
I, [name], [swear by Almighty God] [do solemnly, sincerely and truly affirm and declare] that, on becoming a British citizen, I will be faithful and bear true allegiance to His Majesty Charles III, his heirs, and successors, according to law.

Since 1 January 2004, applicants for British citizenship are also required to make a pledge (see Pledges below).

=== United States ===
The United States Oath of Allegiance (officially referred to as the "Oath of Allegiance," 8 C.F.R. Part 337 (2008)) is an oath that must be taken by all immigrants who wish to become United States citizens.

I hereby declare, on oath, that I absolutely and entirely renounce and abjure all allegiance and fidelity to any foreign prince, potentate, state, or sovereignty of whom or which I have heretofore been a subject or citizen; that I will support and defend the Constitution and laws of the United States of America against all enemies, foreign and domestic; that I will bear true faith and allegiance to the same; that I will bear arms on behalf of the United States when required by the law; that I will perform noncombatant service in the Armed Forces of the United States when required by the law; that I will perform work of national importance under civilian direction when required by the law; and that I take this obligation freely without any mental reservation or purpose of evasion; so help me God.

For people who object to taking an oath (or are not religious), the words "on oath" can be replaced with "and solemnly affirm", and the words "so help me God" can be omitted.

== Pledges ==
In some countries, a pledge is taken by a new citizen, as opposed to an oath. Pledges and oaths differ, the former being "the things one swears by" and the latter "promises to which one binds oneself in swearing by things".

=== Australia ===
Officially called the "Pledge of Commitment":

From this time forward, [under God],
I pledge my loyalty to Australia and its people,
whose democratic beliefs I share,
whose rights and liberties I respect,
and whose laws I will uphold and obey.

All new citizens have the choice of making the pledge with or without the words "under God".

=== Czech Republic ===
Slibuji na svou čest věrnost České republice. Slibuji, že budu dodržovat její Ústavu a ostatní zákony České republiky.

I pledge my loyalty to the Czech Republic on my honor. I promise to abide by its Constitution and other laws of the Czech Republic.

=== Norway ===
Som norsk statsborger lover jeg troskap til mitt land Norge og det norske samfunnet, og jeg støtter demokratiet og menneskerettighetene og vil respektere landets lover.

As a citizen of Norway I pledge loyalty to my country Norway and the Norwegian society, and I support democracy and human rights and will respect the laws of the country.

Applicants for Norwegian citizenship are not required to take the oath; it is optional.

=== Romania ===
Jur să fiu devotat patriei și poporului român, să apăr drepturile și interesele naționale, să respect Constituția și legile României

I pledge my devotion to my country and to the Romanian people, to defend the nation's rights and interests, to respect the Constitution and laws of Romania

=== United Kingdom ===
Since 1 January 2004, applicants for British citizenship are also required, in addition to swearing the oath or affirmation of allegiance, to make a pledge to the United Kingdom as follows:

I will give my loyalty to the United Kingdom and respect its rights and freedoms. I will uphold its democratic values. I will observe its laws faithfully and fulfil my duties and obligations as a British citizen.

Persons acquiring British overseas territories citizenship make an equivalent pledge to the relevant British Overseas Territory. In the very unusual cases of an acquisition of British Overseas citizenship, or British subject status, no pledge would be required.
