= Royal tours of Australia =

Tours of Australia by royal family members

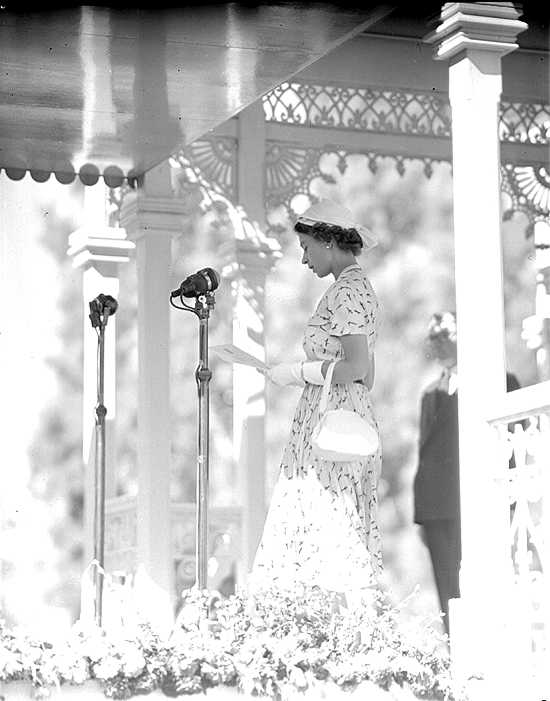
Queen Elizabeth II reads a speech in Sydney, 1954

Members of the British royal family regularly tour Australia, whilst there were only six visits between 1867 and 1954. Elizabeth II was the first reigning monarch of Australia to have set foot on Australian soil; she first did so on 3 February 1954, when she was 27 years old. During her sixteen journeys, the Queen visited every Australian state and the two major territories. In all, the reigning Australian monarch has visited Australia seventeen times, sixteen times under Elizabeth II, and once under her son and successor Charles III.

== Victoria's reign ==
=== Prince Alfred's visit 1867–1868 ===
The first member of the Royal Family to visit Australia was Prince Alfred, Duke of Edinburgh, son of Queen Victoria, in 1867.

The trip was fraught with disaster. Prince Alfred arrived on board HMS Galatea, of which he was also Captain, as part a world cruise. On 31 October 1867, he landed at South Australia and spent three weeks there. He toured South Australia, then attended the funeral of one of his ship's crew, who had accidentally drowned at Glenelg. He departed for Melbourne on the 22nd, and was met by Governor of Victoria on board the HMVS Victoria, who escorted the Galatea back to Melbourne. He officially landed on the 25th.

During the welcome ceremonies, 10,000 people gathered to meet him. An image of William of Orange defeating the Catholic armies at the Battle of the Boyne was erected on a hall in Melbourne. Someone fired shots from inside the hall into the Irish Catholic crowd who had gathered outside to throw stones at the hall, a Catholic boy was killed, and a riot between Irish Catholics and Protestants subsequently broke out.

On the 27th, the public banquet the Prince was supposed to attend turned into a riot after Prince Alfred cancelled his attendance, concerned about security. He then visited Geelong, where large crowds gathered, leading the organising committee to flee. Prince Alfred then visited Bendigo, where a wooden model of the Galatea was erected as the centre of a fireworks display. Three boys climbed into the model and burned to death when fireworks they let off set it on fire. A ball was then planned in the newly opened Alfred Hall, named in his honour. It caught fire and burned to the ground before the ball.

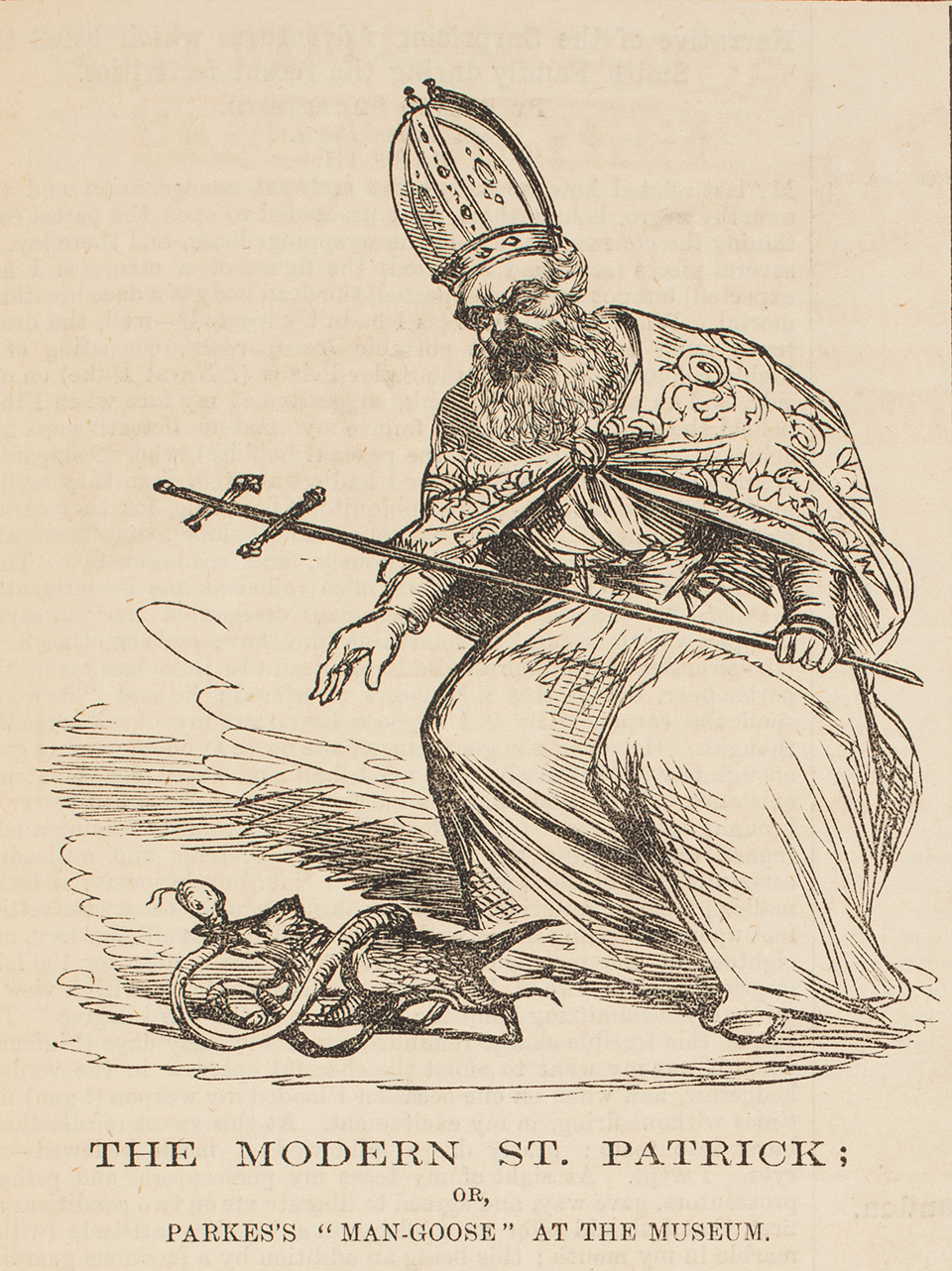
A comic from the Sydney Punch of 22 February 1868, satirising Parkes's demonstration for the Prince

Prince Alfred then left for Tasmania on 28 November. He arrived in Hobart on 6 January, and was met by the steamship Southern Cross and escorted down the Derwent River. Hobart lit enormous bonfires on the hills around the city to mark the occasion. Prince Alfred's visit to Tasmania was relatively uneventful. He laid the foundation stone of St David's Cathedral, Hobart, and several events were held in his honour. He was then taken by road to the north of the state, and stayed at the country estate of Robert Kermode, Mona Vale. He then visited Ross, Campbell Town, Cleveland, Perth and Launceston, where he planted trees in Prince's Square and turned the first sod for the construction of the Launceston railway terminus.

Prince Alfred then visited Sydney for a tour. During his tour of the Australian Museum, the Colonial Secretary, Henry Parkes produced a live snake, and the museum curator Gerard Krefft, produced a 'Timor Mongoose', which subsequently ignored the snake. Parkes then produced another mongoose from a bag, which attempted to escape before fighting and killing the snake for the prince's entertainment. The prince then kept the mongoose as a pet, and took it with him when he left Australia.

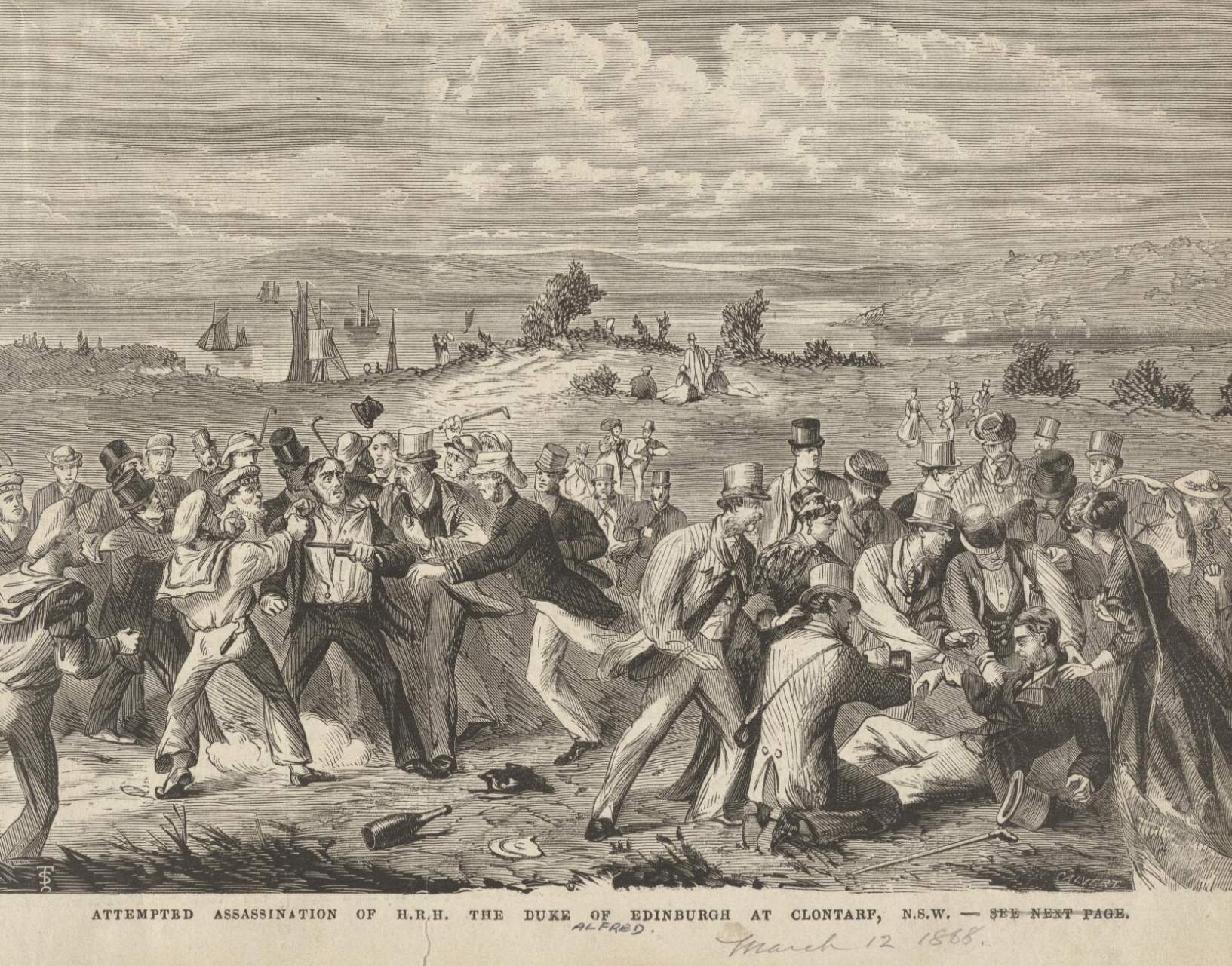
A sketch of the assassination attempt on Prince Alfred

Prince Alfred then departed for Brisbane. Upon his return to Sydney in March, he was shot by Henry James O'Farrell in an assassination attempt while picnicking on the beach in the Sydney suburb of Clontarf, on 12 March 1868. The prince recovered fully and continued on to New Zealand seven months later.

=== Princes' visit, 1881 ===
Prince George of Wales, aged 15, visited Australia with his older brother, Prince Albert Victor of Wales, aged 17, in 1881, as midshipmen in training on HMS Bacchante. They arrived at Albany, Western Australia in May, crossed to South Australia in a passenger vessel, travelled overland to Melbourne and from there sailed on a naval vessel to Sydney.

== Edward VII's reign ==
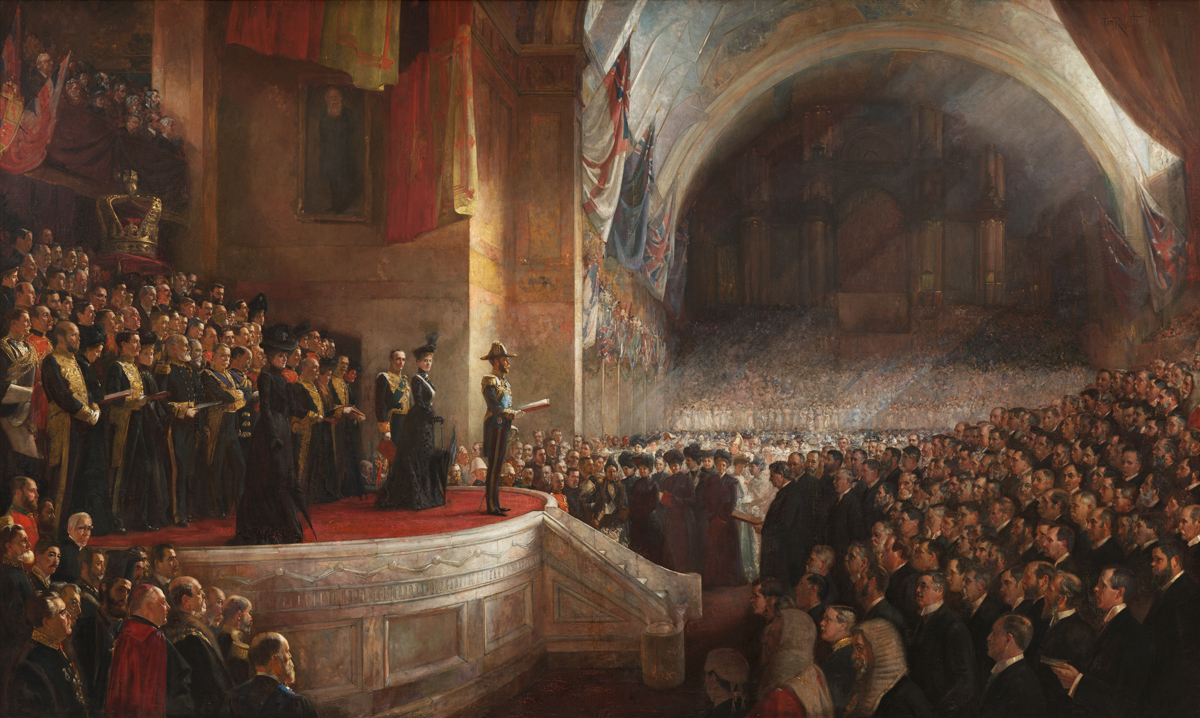
In 1901, Prince George, Duke of Cornwall and York opened the first Australian parliament. Prince George visited Australia with his wife, the Duchess of Cornwall and York.

In 1901, Albert Edward, Prince of Wales and his wife Alexandra were planning an Empire tour. However, the death of Queen Victoria on 22 January 1901 meant that the couple had to prepare for a coronation in 1902. Consequently, Edward's son Prince George, Duke of Cornwall and York, and his wife, Princess Mary, were assigned to undertake the voyage instead. Arriving at Albany, Western Australia, on SS Ophir, they sailed to Melbourne, where he opened the first Australian federal parliament. The royal couple later travelled by train to Sydney. They visited Queensland from 20 to 25 May, where they laid the foundation stone of St John's Cathedral (Brisbane). They were in Adelaide from 9 to 15 July.

== George V's reign ==
Edward, Prince of Wales arrived in Victoria on 26 May 1920, representing his father, George V (previously Prince George, Duke of Cornwall and York), to thank Australians for their participation in the First World War. He was accompanied by Lord Louis Mountbatten.

During the tour, his railway carriage overturned near Bridgetown, Western Australia. However, the Prince remained unharmed and made light of the situation, emerging from the wreck with some important papers and a cocktail shaker, an act which endeared him to Australians and caused them to give him the nickname the "Digger Prince".

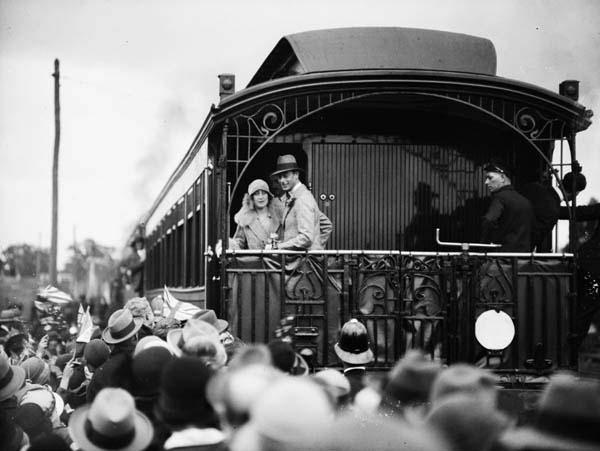
Prince Albert, Duke of York, and Elizabeth, Duchess of York, on the balcony of State Car 4 in Victoria in 1927.

In 1926, Prince Albert, Duke of York, and Elizabeth, Duchess of York, had their first child, Princess Elizabeth, who would later become Queen Elizabeth II. The following year they undertook a Royal Tour without the baby. Queen Elizabeth was, in her own words, "very miserable at leaving the baby". Their journey by sea took them via Jamaica, the Panama Canal and the Pacific; Elizabeth fretted constantly over her baby back in Britain, but their journey was a public relations success. In New Zealand, the Yorks enjoyed the local fishing in the Bay of Islands accompanied by Australian sports fisherman Harry Andreas.

When they sailed into Sydney harbour on HMS Renown, they attracted Australia's first gathering of more than one million people. The principal duty of the Prince on this visit was to open the provisional Parliament House in Canberra, on 9 May 1927. They spent 12 days in New South Wales, seven in Queensland, four in Tasmania, eleven in Victoria, six in South Australia, six in Western Australia and three in the Australian Capital Territory, with the remaining 10 for travelling and recreation.

According to a report by the director-general of the royal visit, Cyril Brudenell White, "the Royal Visitors had expressed the wish that when travelling through the States they might have opportunities of seeing and of being seen by, the greatest number of the general public. They especially desired to meet returned soldiers, new settlers and school children." On 9 May, Prince Albert reviewed over 2,000 Australian troops with various air squadrons flying overhead. One aircraft, piloted by Flying Officer Charles Ewan, crashed, killing Ewan.

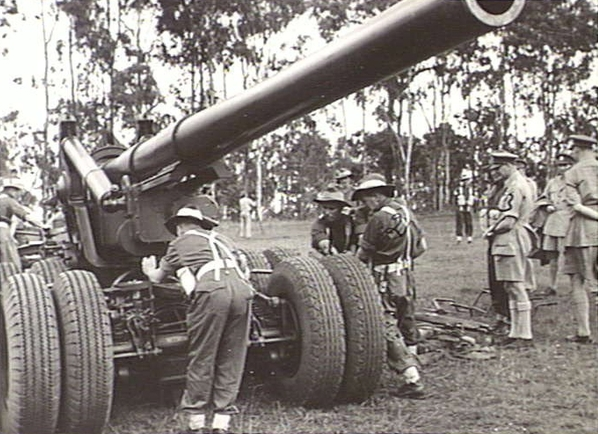
The Duke of Gloucester watches Australian troops training. From 1945 to 1947, he served as the Governor General of Australia.

Prince Henry, Duke of Gloucester, the third son of George V, visited for an extensive 67-day tour in 1934, (4 October – December), the main purpose being to open the centenary celebrations of Victoria on 18 October. He arrived on HMS Sussex at Fremantle, then travelled by train to Adelaide and ship to Melbourne. He also visited the Australian Capital Territory, Tasmania, New South Wales and Queensland. While in Melbourne, the Duke dedicated the Shrine of Remembrance on 11 November and later opened the ANZAC War Memorial in Sydney on 24 November 1934. He sailed to New Zealand from Brisbane, before returning to England.

== George VI's reign ==
The Duke of Gloucester served as Governor-General of Australia from 20 January 1945 – 10 March 1947, the first and only royal Governor-General of Australia.

On 6 March 1948 it was announced that the King George VI and Queen Elizabeth would embark on a royal tour of Australia and New Zealand the following spring, accompanied by their daughter Princess Margaret. Plans were already well advanced when, on 23 November, it was announced that the tour would have to be cancelled owing to the King's declining health. An attempt to reschedule the tour, in scaled-back form, for early 1952 also foundered and plans for Princess Elizabeth and Prince Philip to visit instead were put on hold when the King died in February of that year.

== Elizabeth II's reign ==
=== 1950s ===
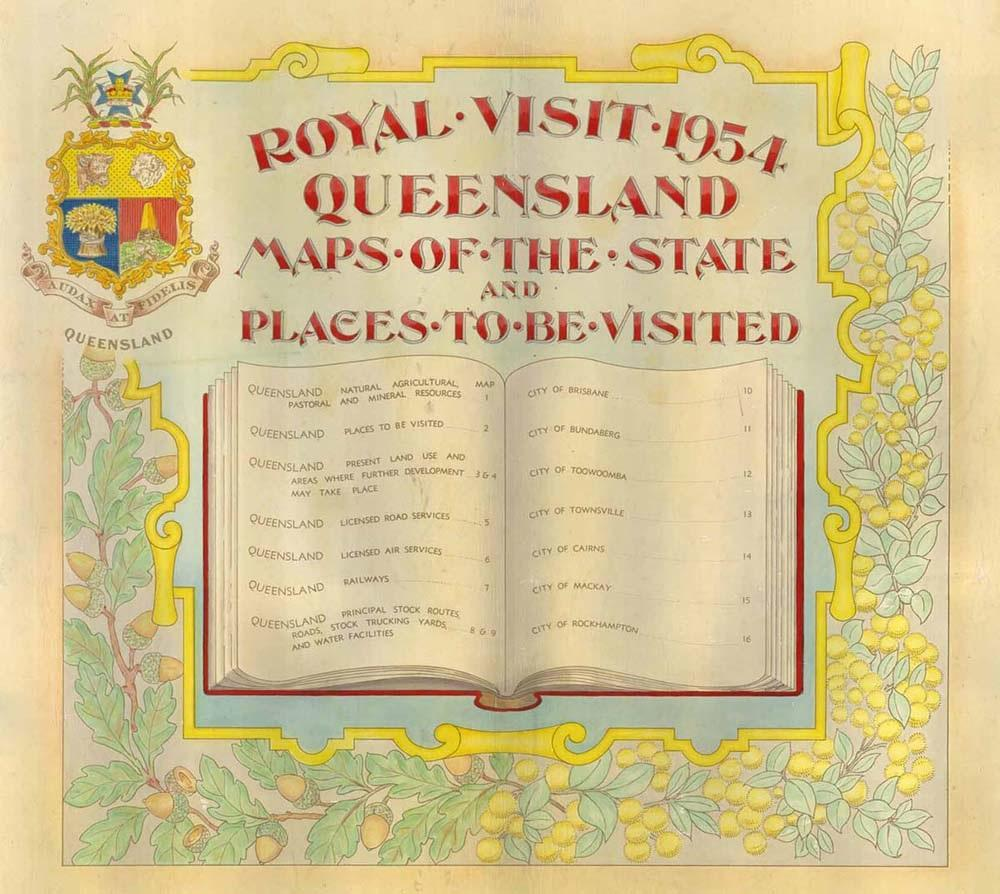
Royal Tour 1954 of Queensland - maps and places to be visited

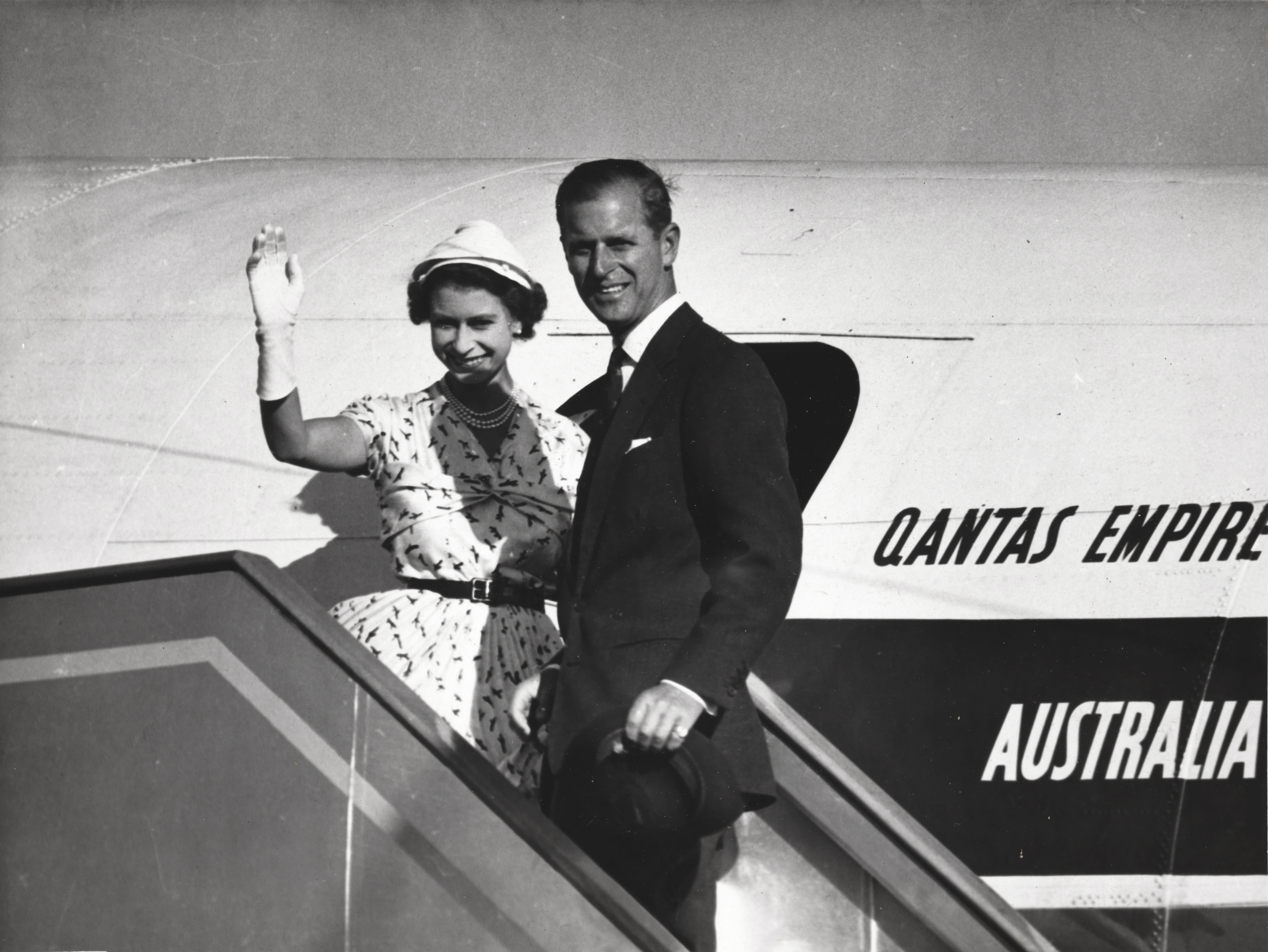
Queen Elizabeth and H.R.H. Duke of Edinburgh wave a final farewell to New South Wales, 1954

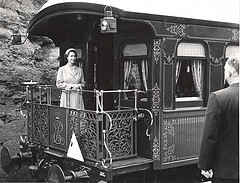
Queen Elizabeth II arriving in Leura for her visit to Leuralla during the 1954 Australian Royal Tour

Elizabeth II was the first reigning monarch of Australia to set foot on Australian soil, coming ashore at Farm Cove, Sydney, on 3 February 1954. She had planned to visit there two years earlier been en route to Australia when her father died while she was on a private visit to Kenya, forcing her to return to the United Kingdom. Once finally in Australia, with her husband the Duke of Edinburgh, she undertook a journey through the Australian Capital Territory, New South Wales, Tasmania, Victoria, Queensland, South Australia and Western Australia, including greeting 70,000 ex-servicemen and women at the Melbourne Cricket Ground and opening the Australian Parliament in Canberra. In all, the Queen travelled 10,000 miles by air, making approximately 33 flights, 2000 miles by road (130 hours in cars in 207 trips), visiting all capitals except Darwin and 70 country towns, many by special "royal trains". On one such train trip they visited Leuralla, at Leura, in the Blue Mountains. Twenty-seven years earlier, Harry Andreas of Leuralla had acted as a fishing guide for the Queen's parents, whilst the young Princess "Lillibet" was left at home with her grandparents, King George V and Queen Mary. This extensive travel allowed some 75 per cent of the Australian population to see the Queen at least once during the tour. Elizabeth was so popular with the Australian people they came out in their thousands, lining the streets for an opportunity to see her drive past or attending formal events where she was the honoured and most distinguished guest. Adoring crowds hoped for the opportunity to shake her hand, give her a posy of fresh flowers or to engage in a short conversation with her as she walked by. At the conclusion of the tour the Prime Minister, Robert Menzies, stated in an article published in the Sydney Morning Herald:

It is a basic truth that for our Queen we have within us, sometimes unrealised until the moment of expression, the most profound and passionate feelings of loyalty and devotion. It does not require much imagination to realise that when eight million people spontaneously pour out this feeling they are engaging in a great act of common allegiance and common joy which brings them closer together and is one of the most powerful elements converting them from a mass of individuals to a great cohesive nation. In brief, the common devotion to the Throne is a part of the very cement of the whole social structure.

In 1956, the Duke of Edinburgh opened the Olympic Games in Melbourne, and opened the 1962 British Empire and Commonwealth Games in Perth, while on a tour through Western Australia, New South Wales and the ACT. In 1965 he opened the Royal Australian Mint, and in 1968 went to Australia to open the Duke of Edinburgh Study Conference.

Queen Elizabeth The Queen Mother visited in 1958 to attend the British Empire Service League Conference in Canberra. She travelled to the Australian Capital Territory, Brisbane, Sydney, Melbourne, Tasmania, Adelaide and Perth, as well as many provincial and country areas during the time of her visit 14 February – 7 March.

Princess Alexandra of Kent visited in 1959 for Queensland's centenary celebrations. She arrived at Canberra and travelled to New South Wales, Victoria, Queensland and the Northern Territory.

=== 1960s ===
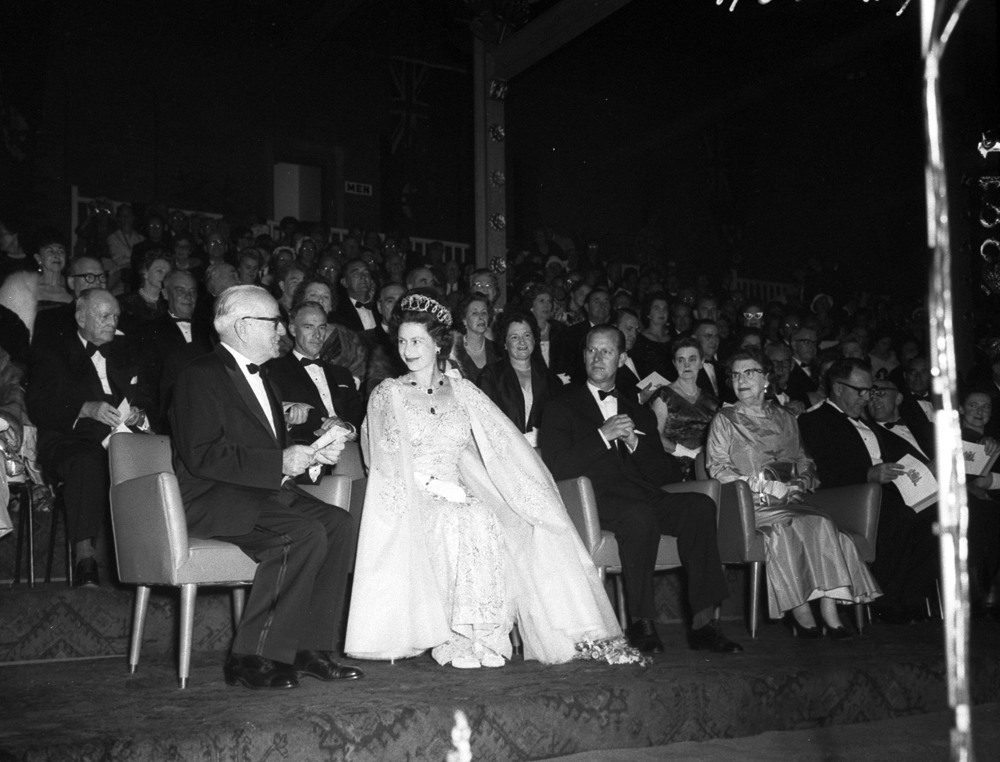
Queen Elizabeth II, and Prince Philip, Duke of Edinburgh at the Sydney Showground during their 1963 royal tour of Australia.

Planned as a less formal tour than the one in 1954, the Queen and Prince Philip returned in 1963, touring all the states and territories, with the primary purpose being to lead the Canberra jubilee celebrations commemorating the 50th anniversary of the naming of the capital. The Queen's itinerary was prepared around the use of the royal yacht Britannia to convey her to each capital city in Australia. Having spent eight weeks travelling to every part of Australia in 1954, the decision to use Britannia as a permanent base meant she could entertain aboard ship and rest between each port as she travelled the 9,000 miles around Australia's coastline.

During this trip she also toured the Royal Flying Doctor Service base in Alice Springs. In preparation for this tour, Sir Roy Dowling, the Queen's Australian Secretary for the visit, was warned about Northern Territory mosquitoes. Dowling was warned, "You could be placed in an extremely embarrassing situation if the Queen's skin was marked and if the press published pictures and stories about those marks." Cities and towns visited included Hobart, Melbourne, Sydney, Canberra, Darwin, Kununurra, Perth, Adelaide, Brisbane, Coolangatta, and Koolan Island.

Princess Marina, Duchess of Kent visited between 26 September and 8 October 1964 for the British Exhibition in Sydney and to open the new Gladesville Bridge. She travelled in New South Wales and the Australian Capital Territory before leaving, with a brief stop in Brisbane on the return flight.

Prince Henry, Duke of Gloucester and his wife Alice visited the Australian Capital Territory, Victoria, New South Wales, Tasmania and Queensland between 20 March and 26 April 1965. The new Tasman Bridge was opened by the Duke in Hobart. He also opened the Royal Easter Show in Sydney and a hydro-electric power station in the Snowy Mountains.

Queen Elizabeth The Queen Mother attended the Adelaide Festival of Arts as its patron, and opened Flinders University, also travelling to Western Australia, the Snowy Mountains and the Australian Capital Territory between 22 March and 7 April 1966.

Charles, Prince of Wales attended the Timbertop campus of Geelong Grammar School for one term in 1966. This was not an official trip as the Prince was there primarily for schooling. A press release of 10 January 1966 made this clear, stating that he should be left alone by journalists: "The Prince of Wales will be engaged in full time study in Australia and will not undertake any official engagements. The Queen and the Commonwealth Government have requested that the Prince's visit should be treated as a private one and that he should be allowed the same freedom from public attention as any other schoolboy."

He returned in 1967 as the Queen's representative at the memorial service for Prime Minister Harold Holt, and again in 1970.

Prince Philip, Duke of Edinburgh helped in 1967 to organise the third Commonwealth Study Conference to be held in May 1968. He travelled to the Australian Capital Territory, Victoria and Tasmania, where he helped volunteer fire fighters to fight a local fire.

Prince Edward, Duke of Kent and his wife Katherine made a 25-day tour between 9 August and 3 September 1969, of the Australian Capital Territory, South Australia, the Northern Territory, Western Australia and Queensland as well as Papua New Guinea. The Duke opened the South Pacific Games in Port Moresby on 13 August.

=== 1970s ===
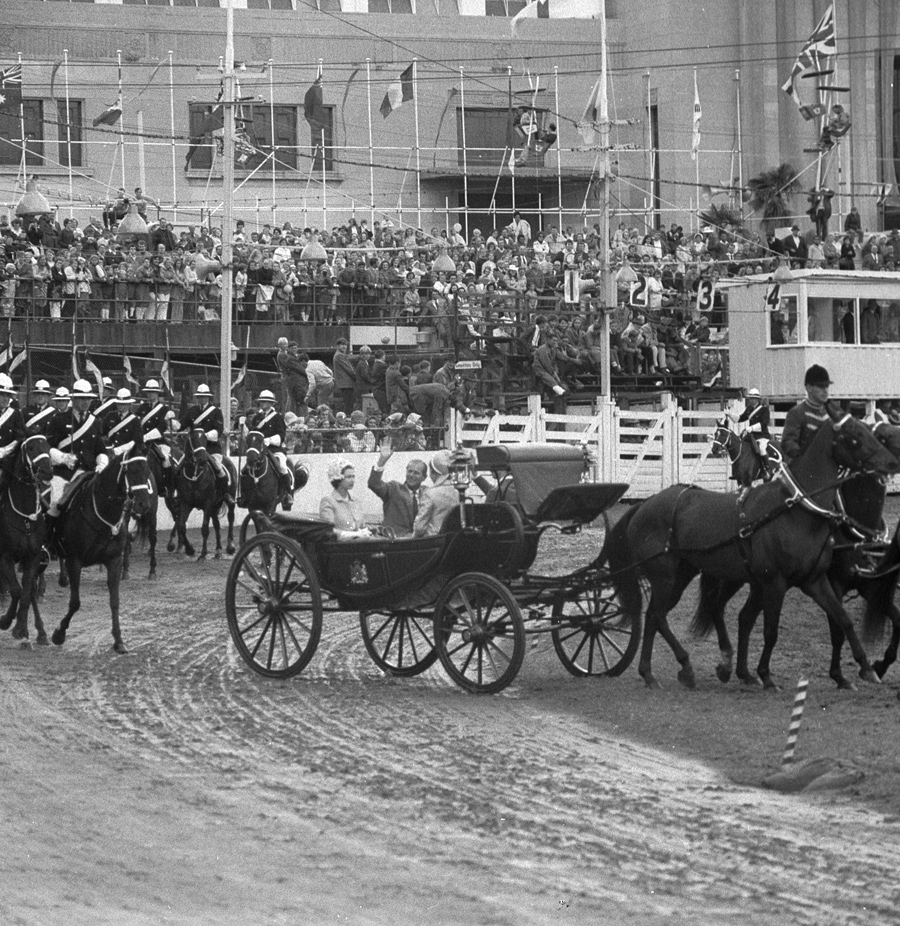
Queen Elizabeth II, Prince Philip, the Prince of Wales, and Princess Anne toured the country for the bi-centenary anniversary of James Cook's first voyage to Australia.

The Queen, Prince Philip, Charles, Prince of Wales (for part of the tour only) and Princess Anne made an extensive tour of Australia in 1970 in connection with the bi-centenary of Captain James Cook sailing up the east coast of Australia in 1770. This was a very popular tour and large crowds turned out to see the Queen. One large gathering occurred when the royal yacht HMY Britannia sailed up the Brisbane River, mooring just below the historic Newstead House in Brisbane. In January 2009, a retired police detective revealed an unsuccessful attempt to derail the Royal Train near Bowenfels on 29 April 1970.

The Queensland tour began on 12 April when the royal yacht Britannia entered Moreton Bay at Caloundra, sailing into Newstead Wharf. Her Royal Highness Princess Anne accepted an invitation to spend three days on a working sheep station in south-west Queensland. She flew to Cunnamulla on 14 April, travelling 47 miles (76 km) by road to Talbarea Station unaccompanied. Princess Anne arrived in Cunnamulla in a government jet a little ahead of schedule. She travelled around the district in a maroon Rolls-Royce which was unloaded from the back of a Royal Australian Air Force carrier plane. Princess Anne was given a demonstration of sheep shearing and wool classing on the working property and was accompanied on a horse ride during her stay.

After several days of engagements in the city of Brisbane, Queen Elizabeth II and The Duke of Edinburgh commenced their regional tour flying to Longreach on Wednesday 15 April. The primary purpose for their stopover in Longreach was to visit the first operational base of Queensland's first airline which became Australia's overseas airline. During the visit they viewed an exhibition of Qantas memorabilia, including a replica of the company's first aircraft, the AVRO 504K of 1921. The occasion marked the 50th anniversary of the founding of Qantas.

Next on the tour was Mount Isa and while there the royals were driven to Kalkadoon Park where the royal couple witnessed a programmed event under the guidance of Ringmaster Mr. J. O’Shea. Kalkadoon Park was the original site of the famous Mount Isa rodeo. The following day, on 16 April, HRH The Duke of Edinburgh was taken on an underground tour of the Mount Isa mine while Queen Elizabeth stayed above ground. The Marshalling Area around R62 Shaft Winder Tower was cleaned, and a display was set up using operational mining equipment from underground so the queen could see it in action. The display was designed to demonstrate the operation of an EIMCO air powered rail mounted rocker shovel loading ore.

The tour continued from Mount Isa and the Royal Family travelled to Mackay, Townsville, the Great Barrier Reef, Cooktown and Cairns. The visit to Mackay in the evening followed a late afternoon flight from Mount Isa on 16 April. Their Royal Highnesses were taken to the Anglican Parish Hall at the intersection of Sydney and Gordon Streets for a civic reception, held in honour of their arrival.

The royal party had a leisurely cruise to Townsville, taking four days to arrive after their departure from Mackay. On the morning of 20 April, the day's program began with a cavalcade of progress at the Townsville sports reserve. The grounds were filled with crowds and children waving their Australian flag. It was a spectacle for the royal visitors and the local community who came out on the day.

Following lunch on board Britannia, the royal family were driven to the site of Queensland's newest university, the James Cook University, Townsville campus. In the presence of many dignitaries, the queen formally granted autonomy to North Queensland's new educational institution. In 2020, James Cook University celebrated its 50th anniversary with a Treasures exhibition, showcasing 50 collection items from Special Collections, Eddie Koiku Mabo Library, James Cook University, Townsville.

The rare collection item – 'James Cook University Development: Pimlico to the First Chancellor archival footage, 1960 – 1970' was one of the Treasures selected for the anniversary year. The 12min film preserved on NQHeritage, the University Library's Special Collections online repository, shows footage of the queen arriving at the official ceremony and being introduced to the official party. Their Royal Highnesses first appear in the film at 6:06 minutes.

According to the formal schedule, the Royal Yacht Britannia arrived off Green Island on the morning of 21 April, after leaving Townsville the day before. The scheduled visit to Green Island was dependent on the weather. All three members of the Royal family were taken by Royal Barge to the Green Island jetty. The visit only lasted 30mins, before Britannia left for Cooktown by 10:15am the same day.

Timed to coincide with the Australian Bicentenary celebrations of James Cook's landing in Cooktown two hundred years earlier in 1770, the Far North Queensland Bicentenary Committee planned a re-enactment of Cook's landing for the royal visitors. The esplanade alongside the Endeavour River was filled with spectators expecting to see the Royal family during their short stopover in Cooktown. Following the re-enactment, the queen officially opened the newly renovated James Cook Museum which was established in 1888 as the St Mary's Convent and boarding school run by the Sisters of Mercy originally from Dungarvan, Ireland. Since that time, the James Cook Museum has been renamed Cooktown Museum, acknowledging the First Nations history and culture that is intrinsically linked to the iconic region.

The Royal family arrived at Berth No. 3, Cairns Wharf the next day on the morning of 23 April. To catch a glimpse of the Royal family, spectators crowded the wharf car park and lined the streets along the official route to the airport. A Ceremonial Farewell was conducted at Cairns Airport involving Governor Alan Mansfield and Premier Joh Bjelke-Petersen. After the queen inspected the Guard of Honour, the official party were escorted to their plane in preparation for the flight to Canberra.

The Queen returned to Australia again in 1973 to open the Sydney Opera House and also in 1974 to open the Australian Parliament in Canberra. This time the Queen returned to London on 28 February for a General Election in Britain, cutting short the tour, which the Duke of Edinburgh completed.

A royal tour of Australia was made in March 1977 as part of the Silver Jubilee of the queen's reign.

Prince Charles made a brief visit in May 1978 to attend the funeral of former Prime Minister Sir Robert Menzies. Wearing the full dress uniform of a commander of the Royal Navy, the prince read from the book of Ecclesiasticus chapter 44: "Let us now praise famous men . . .". He arrived and departed at Melbourne Airport aboard a Royal Air Force Vickers VC10.

=== 1980s ===
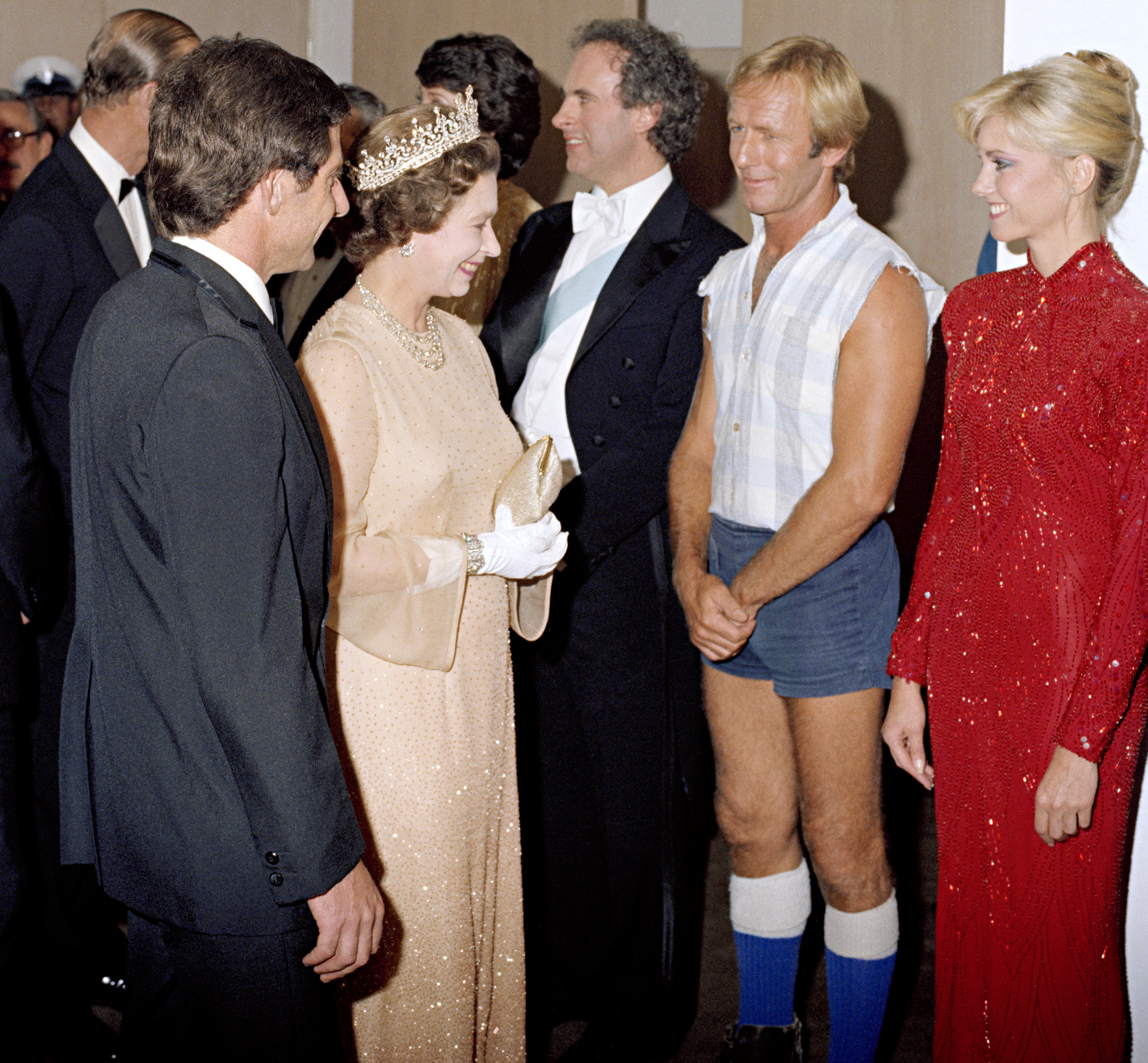
Queen Elizabeth II and Prince Philip meeting Roger Woodward, Paul Hogan, and Olivia Newton-John at a Sydney concert in 1980.

In the 1980s the Queen made short tours to open the new High Court of Australia building in 1980 as well the City Square in Melbourne, then again to open the new National Gallery of Australia in 1982 and the Parramatta Stadium in 1986. During the 1986 visit, at a ceremony held in Government House, Canberra, she signed a proclamation that brought into effect the Australia Act 1986, which severed the final constitutional link between Australia and the United Kingdom.

Lady Diana Spencer, later Princess of Wales, made a short private visit to Australia with her mother and step-father to their sheep station at Yass, north of Canberra, in early February 1981. Prince Charles had proposed to her less than a week before.

The Prince of Wales himself visited Australia shortly after the announcement of his engagement and prior to his July wedding in 1981.

The Queen attended the 1981 Commonwealth Heads of Government Meeting (CHOGM), held in Melbourne in September.

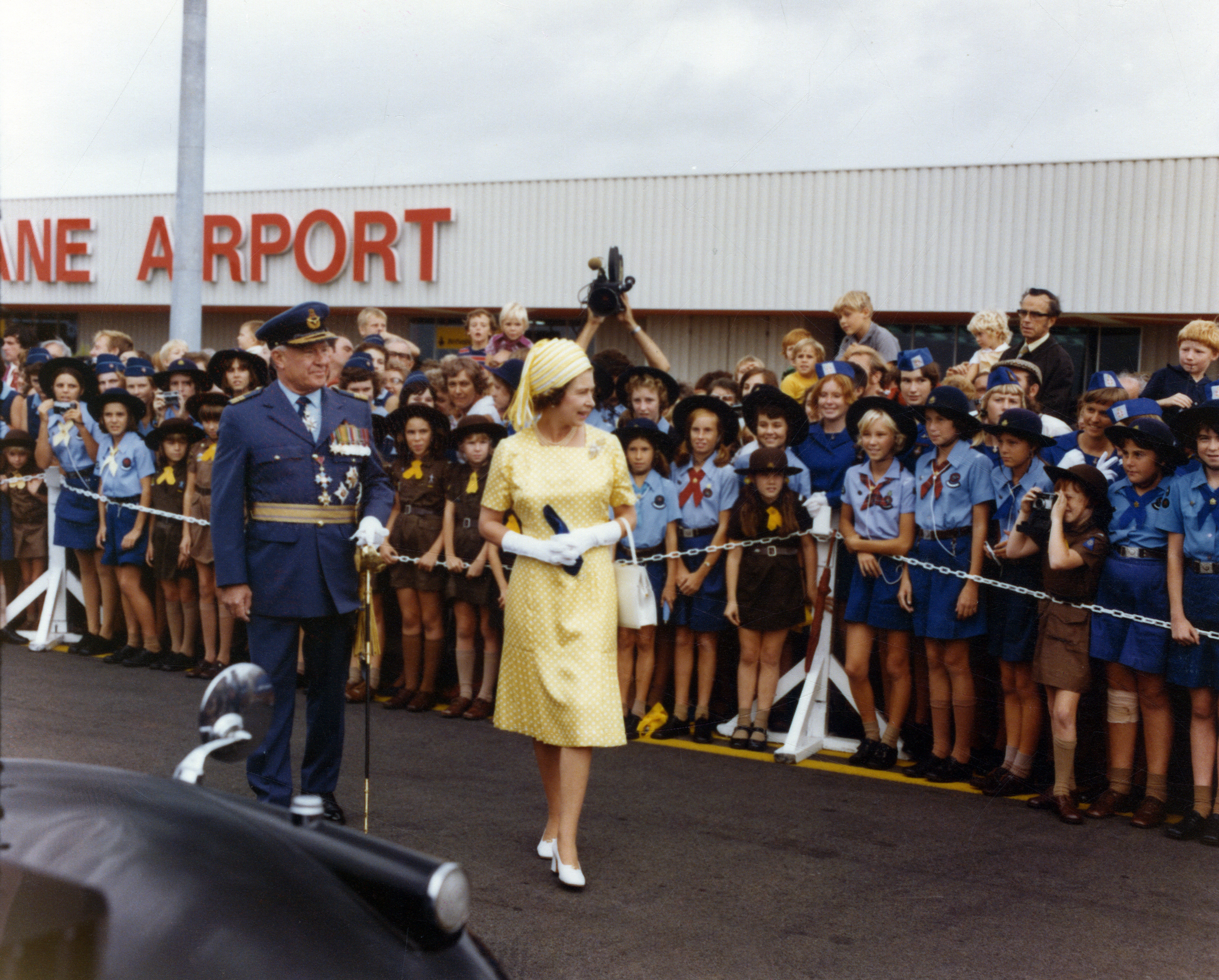
The Queen at Brisbane Airport, 1982

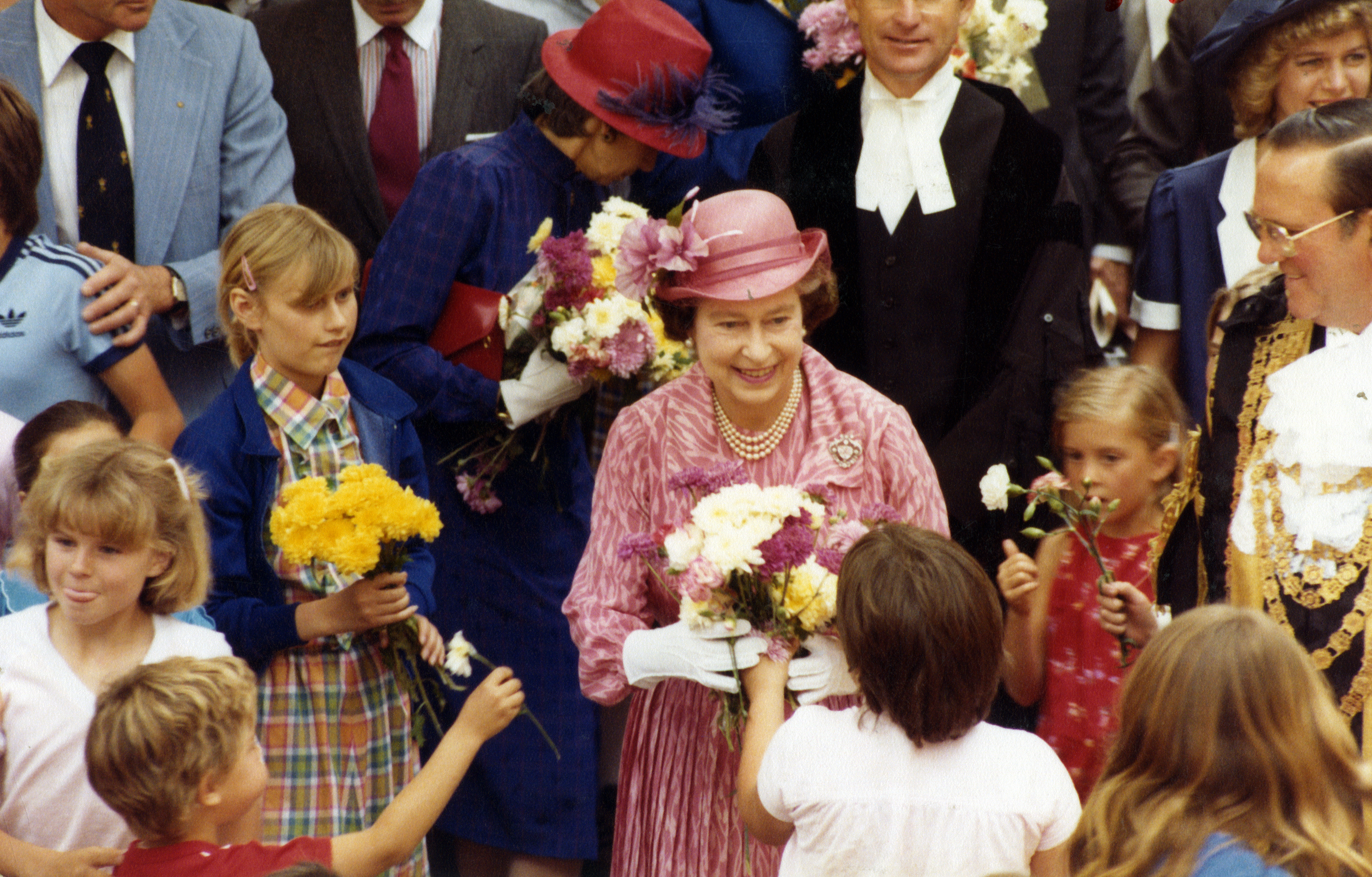
The Queen surrounded by children in Queen Street Mall, Brisbane City, 1982

On 20 March 1983, the Prince of Wales, this time with the Princess of Wales, and their son Prince William, landed in Alice Springs for an official visit. 26 October – 8 November 1985 visited Victoria for 150th anniversary of the state. This tour included visits to Brisbane and Canberra. The Prince and Princess of Wales also made a visit during the bicentenary celebrations in 1988.

The Duke and Duchess of Kent visited Queensland in April 1985 to open the Performing Arts Complex at Southbank. They visited Toowoomba on 24 April following an invitation by Steven Rafter to visit the Toowoomba Grammar School.

The Queen and Prince Philip also made a popular visit in 1988 as part of the bicentenary celebrations. On Saturday 30 April 1988, the Queen opened the World Expo in Brisbane before opening the new permanent Parliament House in Canberra on Monday 9 May.

During the bicentenary celebrations, Australia was also visited by the Prince and Princess of Wales, Prince Andrew, Duke of York and his wife Sarah, Duchess of York, and the Duke and Duchess of Kent.

=== 1990s ===
In 1992, the Queen returned to the sesquicentenary of the incorporation of the city of Sydney. This tour included visits to regional towns, in Dubbo she visited the Western Plains Zoo.

In the last years of the decade she did not visit the country to avoid being embroiled in the debate about the future of the monarchy. Her next tour was timed to be made well after the 1999 referendum on the republic. The Australian government of John Howard had advised the Queen on the timing.

In 1994, Charles, then Prince of Wales, visited Australia. He was giving a speech in Darling Harbour during the Australia day celebrations. David Kang ran up to the Prince and fired two blanks before falling onto the ground; he was arrested by many police officers. The Prince was unhurt and was ushered off the stage.

After her divorce in 1996, Diana, Princess of Wales made one subsequent visit prior to her death in 1997. During that visit she visited the Victor Chang Cardiac Research Institute. Dr Chang had died a few years earlier.

=== 2000s ===
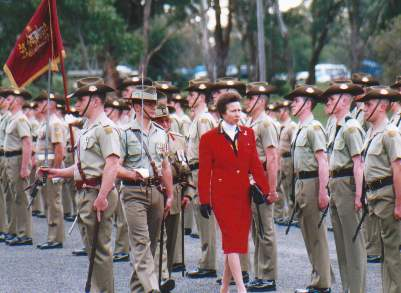
Anne, Princess Royal, passes in front of the Princess Anne Banner at the Royal Australian Corps of Signals during their 75th anniversary, 2000.

In 2000 the Queen made an extended tour in the states of Australia which was followed by another visit in 2002 when she attended the Commonwealth Heads of Government Meeting 2002: the second such meeting held in Australia.

On 11 March 2006, Prince Edward, Earl of Wessex visited Australia to announce the winners of the Commonwealth Writers' Prize. He also had lunch with the Prime Minister, John Howard, visited a neo-natal unit in Heidelberg, visited victims of bush fires in Victoria and attended the opening and closing ceremonies of the Commonwealth Games in Melbourne.

One day later, the Queen and Prince Philip arrived in Melbourne where the Queen opened the Commonwealth Games. As well, the royal couple opened a new section of the Sydney Opera House, attended a Commonwealth Day ceremony in Sydney, had official meetings with the Prime Minister, Governor-General and Leader of the Opposition at Government House in Canberra, lunched with former governors-general, met with firefighters in Canberra, attended and made a formal speech at an official dinner at Parliament House in Canberra to commemorate her 80th birthday and watched some of the events at the games.

Anne, Princess Royal attended the memorial in Rod Laver Arena, Melbourne, Victoria on Sunday, 22 February 2009, for victims of the 2009 Victorian bushfires.

=== 2010s ===
==== 2010 ====
On 19 January 2010, Prince William arrived in Sydney for a three-day visit to Australia.

==== 2011 ====
The following year a visit was made in early 2011 by Prince William to flood damaged areas of Queensland and Victoria.

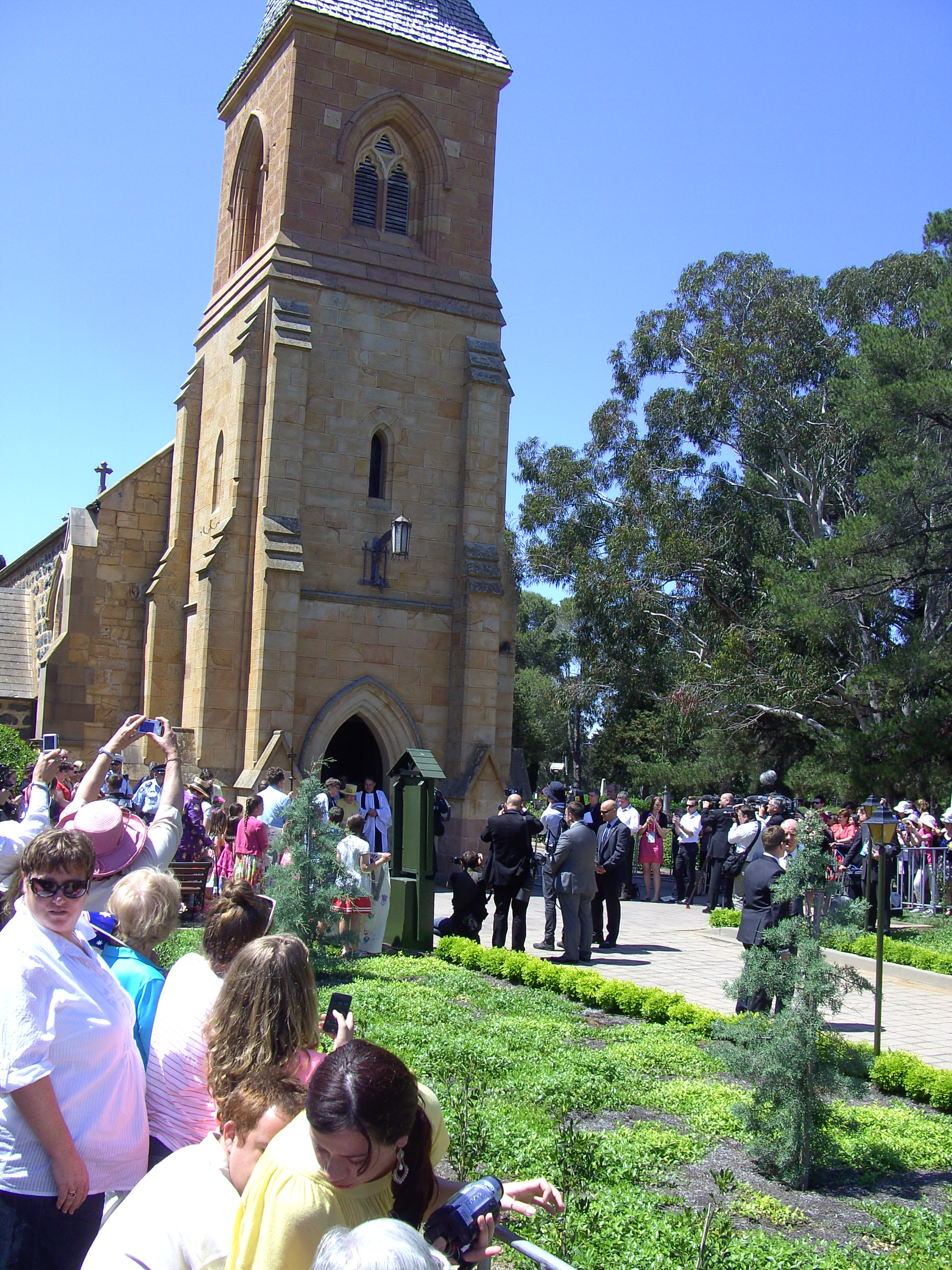
Queen Elizabeth II emerges from St John's Church, Reid, ACT after attending the service on 23 October 2011.

In October 2011, Queen Elizabeth II visited a number of cities in her role as Queen of Australia and Head of the Commonwealth. At a reception in her honour held at Parliament House in Canberra on 21 October 2011, the Prime Minister, Julia Gillard, described the Queen as "a vital constitutional part of Australian democracy". The Queen in her speech at the same reception stated that:

It has been a difficult year for this country in many ways despite the successes. The world witnessed the anguish of Australians as they lived through a summer of national disasters. We were all inspired by the courage and resolution shown by those affected in the face of crippling desolation. Ever since I first came here in 1954 I have watched Australia grow and develop at an extraordinary rate. This country has made dramatic progress economically in social scientific and industrial endeavours and above all in self-confidence.

The Queen visited Canberra, Brisbane, Melbourne and Perth during the tour. In Perth she attended the Commonwealth Heads of Government Meeting.

===== 2012 =====
Prince Charles travelled to Australia in November 2012 with the Duchess of Cornwall as part of a visit to Papua New Guinea, Australia and New Zealand on behalf of the Queen of each respective Realm in the year of the Queen's Diamond Jubilee. Earlier in 2012 Prince Edward, Duke of Kent visited from 28 January to 1 February and Prince Richard, Duke of Gloucester visited from 21 to 26 May.

===== 2013 =====
In October 2013, Prince Harry visited Sydney for the centenary celebrations of the Royal Australian Navy. Representing his grandmother, the Queen, he took the salute from HMAS Leeuwin alongside Governor-General Quentin Bryce. The prince made a further visit to SAS forces in Perth before departing for the United Kingdom.

===== 2014 =====
In April 2014, Prince William arrived in Australia for a ten-day tour with his wife, the Duchess of Cambridge, and their son, Prince George. The family's itinerary took them to Sydney, Brisbane, Canberra, Uluru and Adelaide. In November 2014, Prince Edward, Earl of Wessex, visited Australia at the invitation of The Duke of Edinburgh's International Award – Australia. He attended 18 engagements in Sydney, Brisbane and Perth.

===== 2015 =====
Prince Harry, before reporting for duty to the Australian Defence Force, visited the Australian War Memorial in Canberra on 6 April 2015. In May 2015, Prince Harry made a farewell walkabout at the Sydney Opera House and visited Macquarie University Hospital. In November 2015, Prince Charles and the Duchess of Cornwall visited Adelaide, Canberra, Sydney, Albany and Perth.

===== 2018 =====
In April 2018 Prince Edward visited Australia to attend the Gold Coast Commonwealth Games as Vice Patron of the Commonwealth Games Federation. Whilst in Australia Prince Edward, in his capacity as Chair of the Trustees of the International Award Foundation he attended 40 functions to support the development of The Duke of Edinburgh's International Award – Australia. Prince Edward visited Melbourne, Ballarat, Romsey, Hobart, Brisbane, Adelaide, Seppeltsfield. Prince Edward continued his international fund raising challenge playing a set of Real Tennis on every real tennis court in the world, including the 5 courts in Australia. In addition to visiting schools and youth organisations to promote the Duke of Ed, he also conducted round table meetings with the university sector, business and sporting organisations. Prince Charles and the Duchess of Cornwall returned again in 2018 for events associated with the Gold Coast Commonwealth Games. In June 2018, Kensington Palace announced that Prince Harry and his wife the Duchess of Sussex would tour Australia around the time of the Invictus Games which was held in Sydney in October 2018. Later, Prince Andrew, Duke of York undertook a 9-day tour of the country's eastern states in November. During this trip, Meghan announced that she and Harry were expecting their first child.

===== 2019 =====
In September 2019, Prince Edward visited Australia to in his capacity as Chair of the Trustees of the International Award Foundation to assist celebrate the 60th Anniversary of the Duke of Edinburgh's International Award in Australia. He attended 25 functions in Sydney, Wollongong, Alice Springs and Darwin, including presenting nearly 400 Gold Awards at a ceremony held in Sydney Town Hall. Prince Andrew also visited Western Australia in October 2019 as part of his Pitch@Palace initiative, although the Prince did no media interviews during the tour and kept a low profile during the visit due to controversy surrounding his association with Jeffrey Epstein.

=== 2020s ===
==== 2022 ====
The Princess Royal and her husband Vice Admiral Sir Timothy Laurence, toured Australia from 9 to 11 April 2022. On the first day of her visit, she opened the 200th Sydney Royal Easter Show, which she first opened with her parents and brother Charles in 1970. She had last attended the event in 1988. She had an engagement as patron of the Royal Agricultural Society of the Commonwealth, before attending a dinner at the Sydney Olympic Park. The couple also met with representatives of the New South Wales Rural Fire Service, the Royal Australian Corps of Signals and Royal Australian Corps of Transport.

== Charles III's reign ==
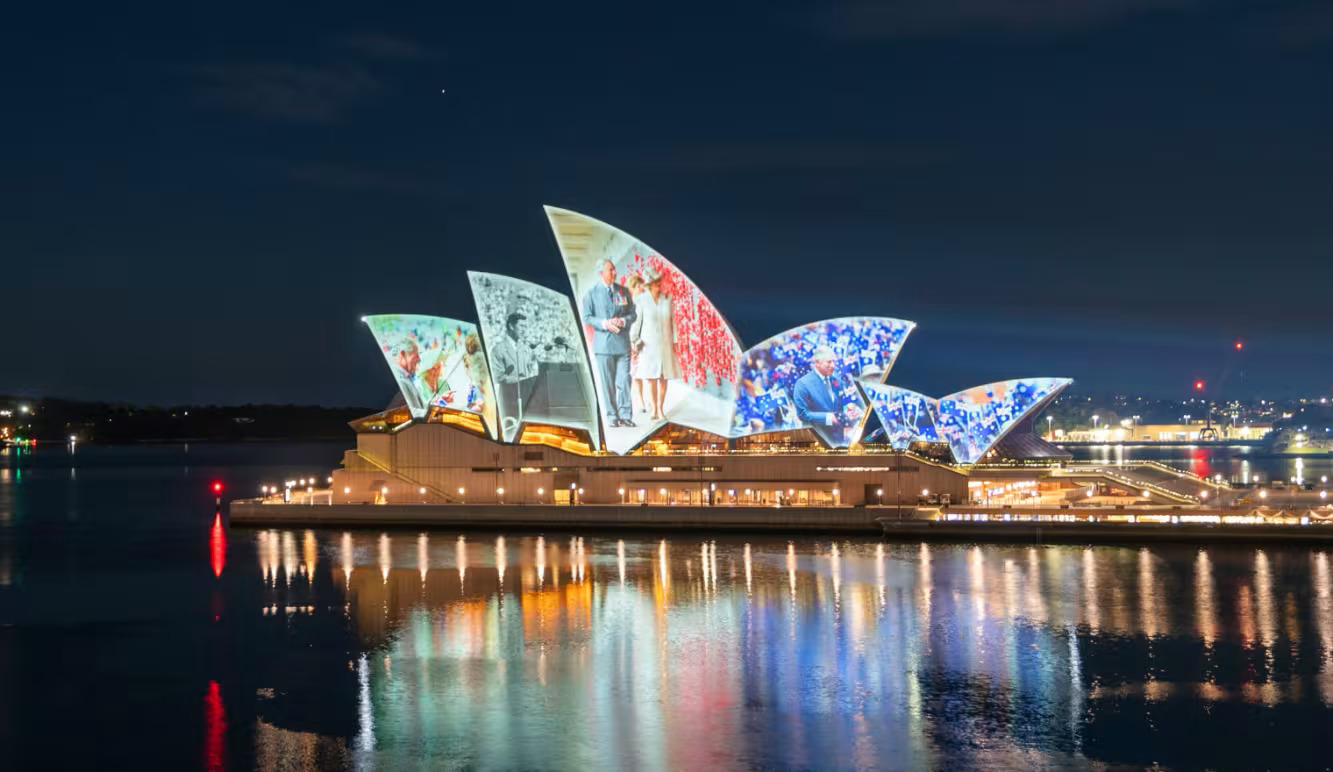
Sydney Opera House lit up with images of previous royal tours of Australia by Charles and Camilla, 2024

Prince Edward visited Sydney from November 20 to November 23, 2023, in his role as the Duke of Edinburgh to support the Duke of Edinburgh's International Award program. During the visit, Edward met with young Duke of Ed participants, volunteers and thought leaders in non-formal education.

King Charles III and Queen Camilla arrived in Australia on 18 October 2024 to tour the Australian Capital Territory and parts of New South Wales. The tour was Charles's first of Australia as its sovereign, also making him the second reigning monarch to visit the nation. Their first engagements took place on 20 October, including a visit to St Thomas' Anglican Church, where they greeted crowds. The royal couple spent the next day in Canberra, where they visited the Australian War Memorial and where Charles gave a speech at a reception for the Australian Parliament. After his speech, he was heckled by Senator Lidia Thorpe, who was escorted out of the reception. The King and Queen spent the final day of the tour in Sydney, where they undertook several engagements, including a naval review in Sydney Harbour.

The Princess Royal, as Colonel-in-Chief to the Royal Australian Corps of Signals (RA Sigs), travelled to New South Wales, Victoria and Queensland from 8 to 11 November 2025 to mark 100 years since the formation of the Corps. During her visit, Anne also attended a series of commemorative events for Remembrance Day in Sydney and Brisbane.

== Visits to external territories ==
Queen Elizabeth II visited the Cocos (Keeling) Islands on 5 April 1954, while the territory was still administered by the Colony of Singapore.

Queen Elizabeth II visited Norfolk Island on 11 February 1974.

== See also ==
- List of official overseas trips made by George V
- List of official overseas trips made by Edward VIII
- List of official overseas trips made by George VI
- List of Commonwealth visits made by Elizabeth II
- List of official openings by Elizabeth II in Australia
- Transportation of the Prime Minister of Australia
- Victorian Railways Royal Train

== Home media ==
In 2014 Umbrella Entertainment released a DVD commemorating Elizabeth II's 1953–1954 visit to New Zealand and Australia, When the Queen Came to Town, directed by Maurice Murphy and narrated by Bert Newton. In the film newsreel footage is interspersed with brief retrospectives from participants and witnesses to the proceedings, and a parallel narration by Lorraine Bayly to a small group of pre-schoolers on the subject of fairy-tale princesses. The film makes reference to the 1953 Tangiwai disaster which immediately preceded the royal visit to New Zealand and might have prompted its cancellation.
