= Edward Hewlett Hogben =

Australian architect

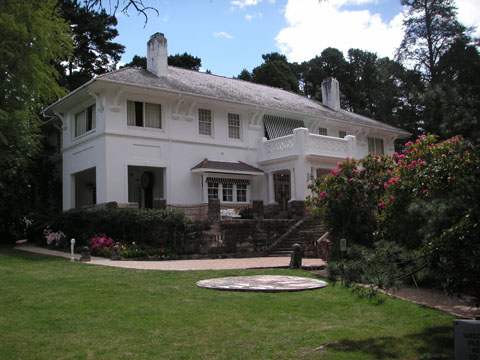
- Leuralla
- Born: 6 March 1875; Strawberry Hills, New South Wales, Australia
- Died: 1 March 1936 (aged 60); Katoomba, New South Wales
- Education: Newington College; Sydney Technical College
- Occupation: Architect
- Spouse: Elsie Sarah (née Isaacs) 1878–1954
- Parent(s): Edward Hogben 1835–1891 and Jemima Henrietta (née Hewlett) 1847–1918

Edward Hewlett Hogben (6 March 1875 – 1 March 1936) was an Australian architect who had a prominent role in modernising the Carrington Hotel, Katoomba in 1911 when he designed the new facade for Sir James Joynton Smith. In partnership with the estate agent Alfred Craig, and then with the Goyder brothers, he played an influential role in the architectural development of both Katoomba and Leura between the wars. An early commission in 1905 was the design of the Kanowna guesthouses for John Connely in Wascoe Street, Leura. His most distinguished private home was the second Leuralla, built for Harry Andreas.

Hogben was born to Edward Hogben (1835–1891) and Jemima Henrietta (née Hewlett 1847–1918). His father was Mayor of Kogarah Council (1887–1888). In 1889 Hogben commenced at Newington College under the presidency of the Rev Dr William Kelynack and the Headmastership of William Henry Williams.
