= Cabbage-tree hat =

Type of hat

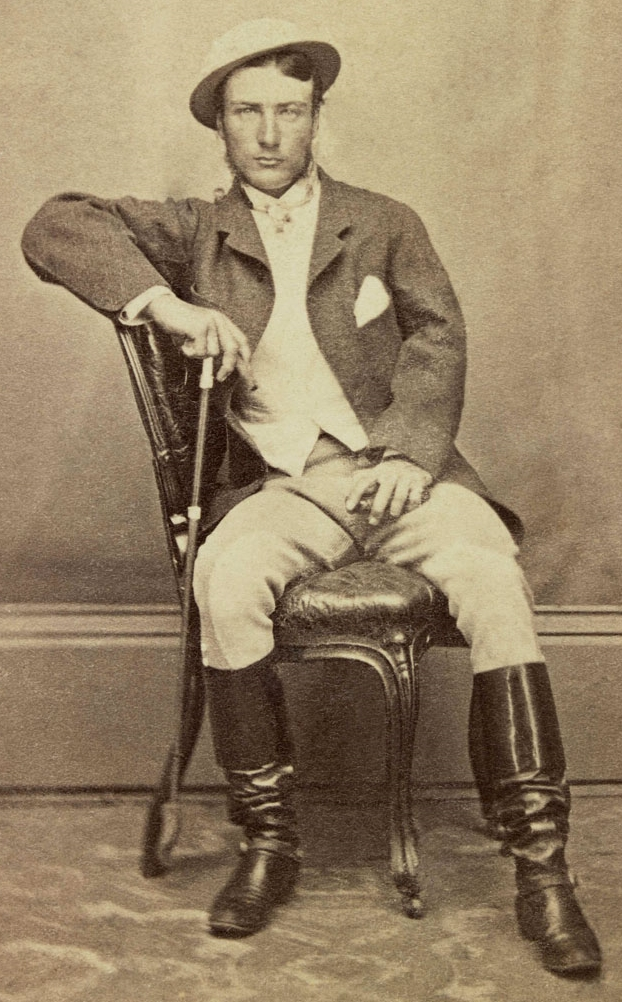
Australian writer Marcus Clarke wearing a cabbage tree hat, 1866

A cabbage tree hat (also known as a cabbage palm hat) is a hat made from weaving the leaves of the Livistona australis, also known as the cabbage-tree palm. It is known as the first distinctively Australian headwear in use.

== Early adoption ==
Seeking protection from the sun, early European settlers started to weave hats using the fronds from the native palm, instead of straw. The hat soon became popular throughout the colonies, first among the colony's bushmen but later with city folk. In 1868, a cabbage tree hat made by maker Thomas Reynolds, was presented to Prince Alfred, the second eldest son of Queen Victoria during the first Royal visit to Australia.

The hats were predominantly made in one of Australia's first cottage industries, by families, particularly women and children, and later by large manufacturers.They were also made by convicts and the invalid to sell.

The hat was most popular with coachmen, stockmen, bullockys, squatters and farmers. The cabbage tree hat gradually fell out of fashion with the Australian public, replaced by the felt hat.

== Construction ==
The process of making a cabbage tree hat involved boiling, then drying, and finally bleaching and shaking open the leaves of the cabbage tree palm. The leaf would then be split into strands using a hand held tool, and then plaited into longer strands called 'sinnet'. The sinnet would then be wound into shape from the centre of the crown, stitched at every corner, blocked, lined and ironed by the hat maker. A velvet band or ribbon, leather chin strap and button were attached for ornamentation.

The Powerhouse Museum describes a cabbage-tree hat thus: "Finely woven natural straw coloured hat; high tapering domed crown, wide flat brim; applied layered hat band of coarser plaiting with zig-zag border edges."

A well made hat was said to last for many years, and was lightweight. The fibre would swell and close the plaits when wet and let air circulate when dry. The hat was known for its ability to hold its shape with rough usage while retaining springiness, and drying quickly in the sun.

== Cabbage tree mob ==
During the convict era, gangs of insolent youths were known as cabbage tree mobs because they wore hats. One of their favourite pastimes was to crush the hats of men deemed too "full of themselves". Cabbage tree mobs are recognised as a predecessor of the larrikin.

== Mentions of the hat ==
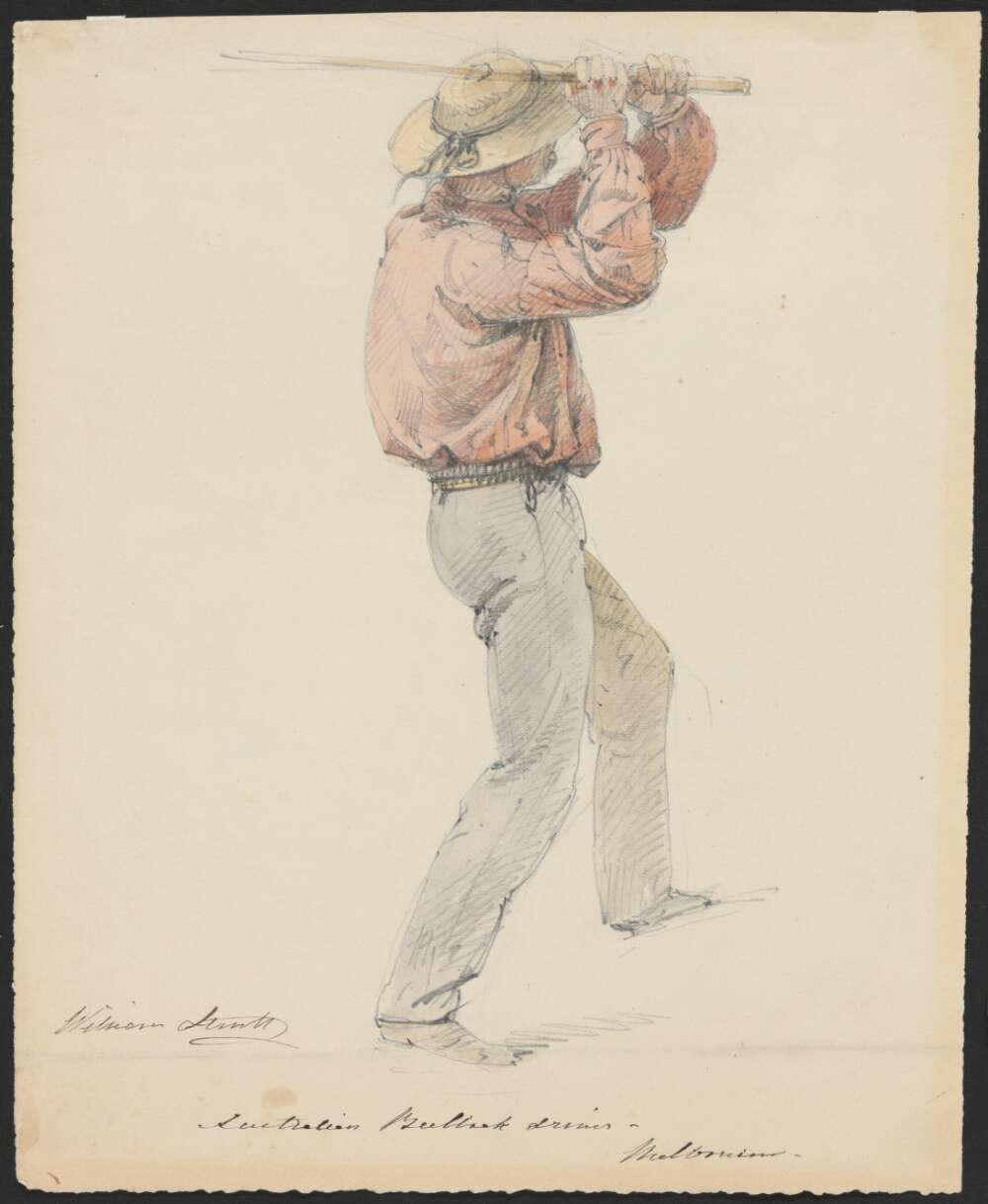
1851 illustration of a bullock driver wearing a cabbage tree hat by William Strutt.

There are many mentions of the hat in Australian documents.

- In Volume 2 of Collins, David: An Account of the English Colony in New South Wales from its first settlement, in January 1788, to August 1801, London 1802, Chapter XIX Flinders voyage to Moreton Bay in 1799.
- In Volume 6 of the Historical Records of Victoria, published after the address by Police Historian Gary Presland at the Annual General Meeting in March 2005, it states:
  "Police Troopers wore a distinctive dress uniform, consisting of a blue jacket with red facings, black trousers with red stripe, Wellington boots, and pill-box cap. While on duty in the bush they usually wore patrol jacket and trousers, and wide brimmed cabbage tree hat."
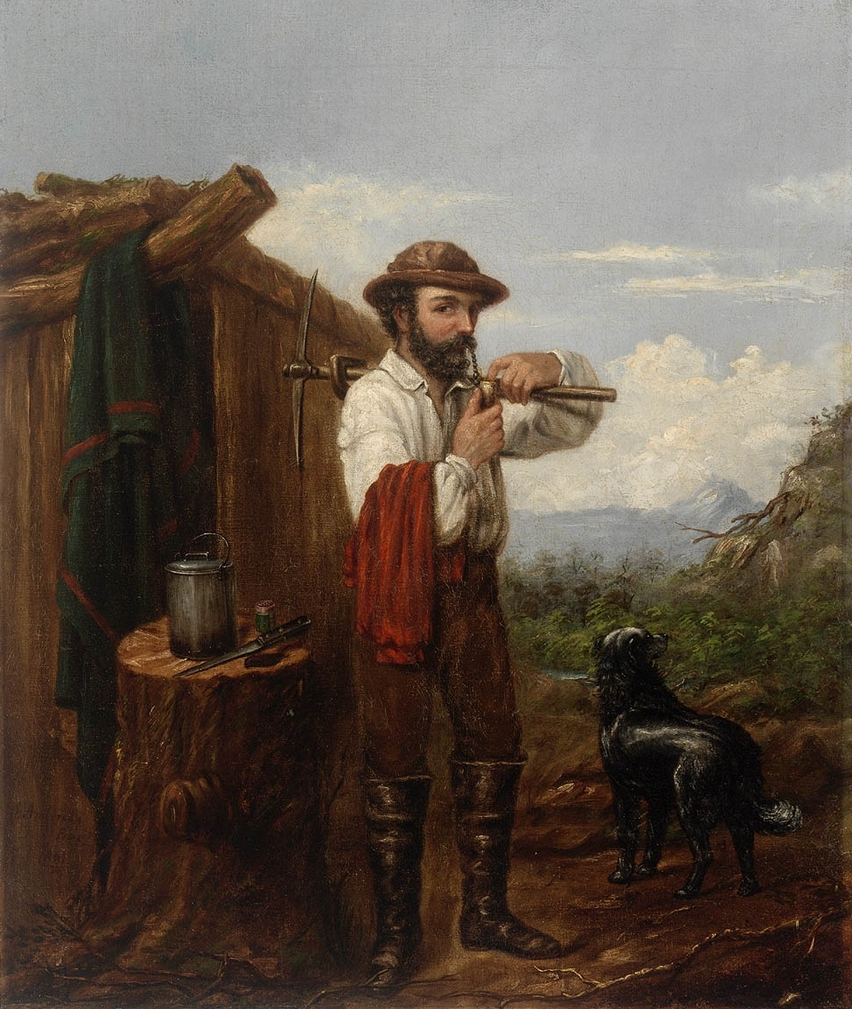
- Goldminer, 1861 oil painting by J. Anderson, featuring a man wearing a cabbage tree hat.
  In Edward Micklethwaite Curr's Recollections of Squatting in Victoria, it says:
  "Of the gentlemen one saw, a good sprinkling were squatters ... Many of them, I noticed, indulged also in blue serge shirts in lieu of coats, cabbage tree hats, belt supporting leather tobacco pouches, and in some cases a pistol"
- In Margaret Maynard's Fashioned from Penury, it states:
  "... In the country, cabbage palm hats, as large as an umbrella, tied under the throat and sometimes burnt black by the sun, were especially common. Practical and cool, they were plaited from the plant Livistonia australia that grows in semi-coastal rainforest areas ... Later the making of these hats from cabbage palm became a form of cottage industry"
- On page 53 of Men of Yesterday, Margaret Kiddle refers to the cabbage tree hat as "ubiquitous" in the 1840s.

== Cultural impact ==
The cabbage tree hat was associated with the Australian fashion of the 'Old Digger', consisting of moleskin trousers, red shirt and cabbage tree hat. This is due to the attire being associated with early Australian gold diggers.

In the 1930s Australian musical Collits' Inn, there is musical piece titled The man in the cabbage tree hat.

There was a British television play The Cabbage Tree Hat Boys (1965).

In Jane Smith's 2017 book The Gold Escort Gang, the main character, Tommy, travels through time back the Australian gold rush using a magic cabbage-tree hat.

== See also ==
- List of hat styles
