= The Cabbage Tree Hat Boys =

- Play of the Week episode
- Episode no.: Series 11; Episode 15
- Directed by: Graham Evans
- Written by: Peter Yeldham
- Original air date: December 13, 1965
- Running time: 60 mins

"The Cabbage Tree Hat Boys" is a 1965 British television play by Peter Yeldham set in Australia that was later adapted for radio. It was set in 1840s Australia.

== Premise ==
The struggle between Australian landowners, who want the cheap convict labour sent from Britain and the working class who want economic and social equality.

It opens with a convict ship, the Hashemy, about to dock at an Australian port in 1849. The cabbage tree hat boys, so called because the hats they wore were made of leaves of the cabbage tree, spear-head a group campaigning against the British transportation of convicts to Australia.

Mathew is one of the cabbage hat tree boys. His father Jeremy is torn between sympathy for his son's actions, which he considers right, and his anxiety to avoid trouble.

== Cast ==
- Ewan Hooper as Jeremy Conway
- Jane Hylton as Kitty Conway, his wife
- Ewan Roberts as Edward Grayson, a magistrate
- Robert Arnold as Captain Johnson, a British officer
- David Cook as Matthew Conway
- Christopher Burgess as Trooper
- Ronald Cunliffe as Jamie Stuart
- David Ellison as Corporal
- Edward Higgins as Shopkeeper
- James Lynn as Eli Levitt
- Jacqueline Pearce as Maureen Geraghty
- Victor Platt as Geraghty
- Celestine Randall as Flora
- Sam Walters as Private

== Reception ==
The Daily Telegraph said the episode "considerably enlivened" the show. The Sydney Morning Herald reviewing the London production said it was "both entertaining and socially significant... eminently successful."

== Radio versions ==
The play was adapted for BBC radio in 1969.

The play was adapted for ABC radio in 1967. It was produced again in 1969. An Age review of the latter said it was "not sufficiently developed".
