= Victorian Railways Royal Train =

Trains to transport the royal family in Australia

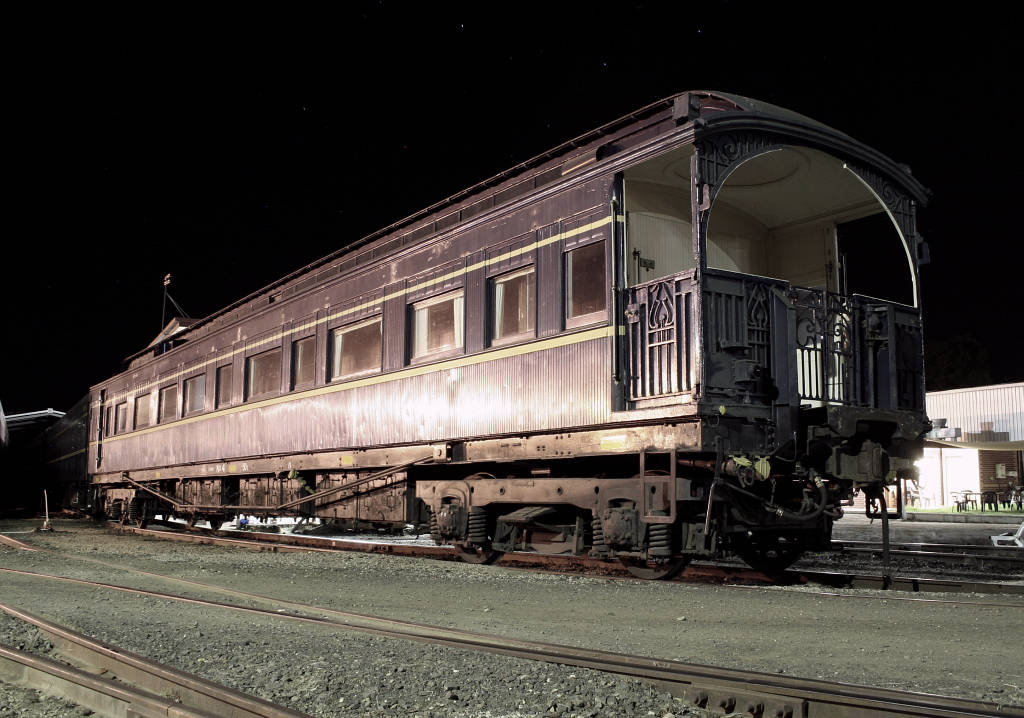
State Car 4 as preserved at the Seymour Railway Heritage Centre

The Victorian Railways' (VR) Royal Trains operated to transport members of the royal family on their numerous tours of Australia on the Victorian rail network. The same carriages were also used for a number of vice-regal trains for the governor-general of Australia and the governor of Victoria. The last Royal Train ran in 1988.

== Operation ==
Royal trains usually operated with special carriage stock set aside for the purpose. Most trains operated with double headed locomotives to reduce the chance of the train being stranded due to locomotive failure, with a third locomotive running in front of the train to ensure the track was clear. A special headboard with the royal coat of arms was usually affixed to the front of the leading locomotive.

=== Carriages ===
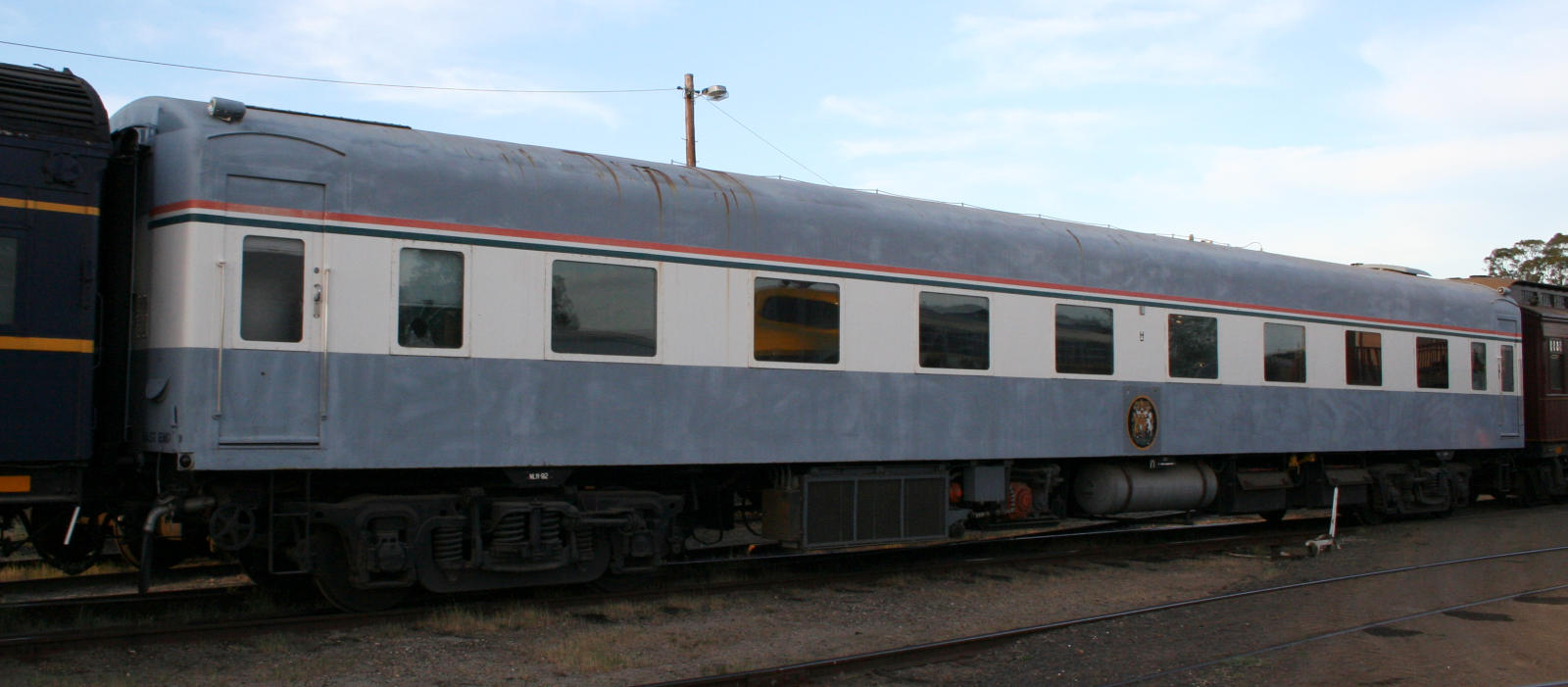
State Car 5 in storage at the Seymour Railway Heritage Centre

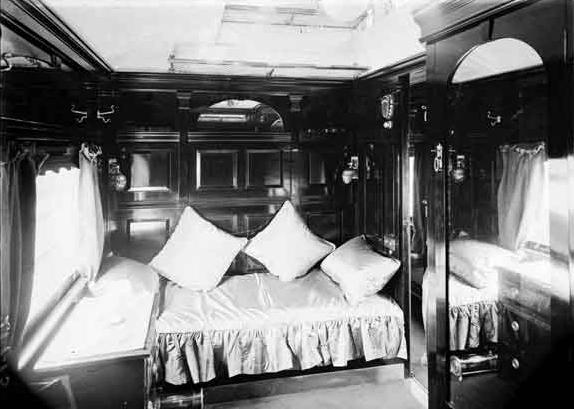
Interior of a sleeping compartment, used on a Royal Train in 1927

In the history of the Victorian Railways there were five special carriages designated for royal train and other special services, designated State Car 1 through to State Car 5.

From 1954, the carriages were painted in the standard royal blue with gold (chrome yellow) trim of the Victorian Railways, created for Spirit of Progress in 1937, with the exception of the 1988 Royal Tour. Operated by its successor V/Line, this trip was operated by two freshly cleaned, partially repainted (below footplate) and polished locomotives in the standard V/Line orange and grey livery, with the carriages painted in a one off 'executive' livery of grey and white, with orange and green trim.

- State Car 1 entered service in 1890 as Enterprise. It was renamed in 1900 and was scrapped in August 1956.
- State Car 2 and State Car 3 both entered service in 1901 and were both rebuilt for other uses in 1919.
- State Car 4 was built in 1912 based on the then state of the art wooden E type carriage design. It featured an observation balcony at one end, Governor's and Lady's bedrooms (which could be separated by doors), dining room, kitchen, male and female bathrooms (each with a bath, shower and toilet), and accommodation for ladies-in-waiting and other support staff. A total of nine sleeping berths were provided. This carriage is owned by VicTrack Heritage and is allocated to the Seymour Railway Heritage Centre.
- State Car 5 was based on the steel air-conditioned S type carriage design in 1951. Royal insignia were painted on each side. The carriage featured a kitchen, lounge/dining area, two main bedrooms with en-suite facilities (a bathroom with a bath, basin, shower and toilet), two sleeping/sitting compartments for attendants, and a third bathroom. In 1954 it was displayed at the Centenary Exhibition. It was repainted into the grey livery in 1988 for the royal tour of the year, and has since been allocated to the Seymour Railway Heritage Centre collection.
- Mitta Mitta was converted from BRS 228 for use as a support carriage for State Car 5 on vice-regal trains in 1994, but was never used in the role. It was fitted with sleeping berths, bathroom, kitchen, and a dining and lounge area.
- Norman (former Spirit of Progress parlour/lounge/club car) was also used on royal trains.

== Trains ==
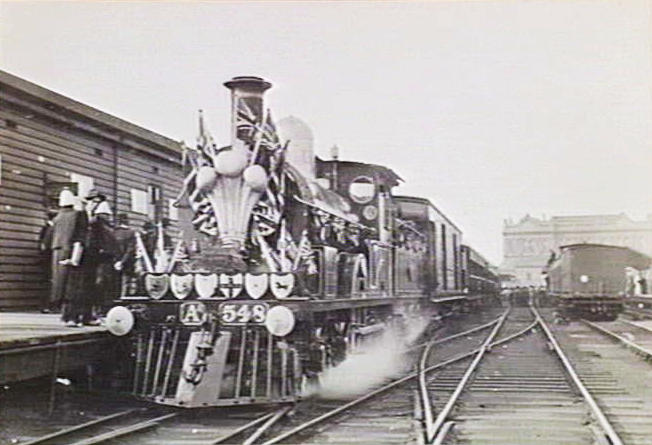
Locomotive AA 548 decorated for a Royal Train in 1901

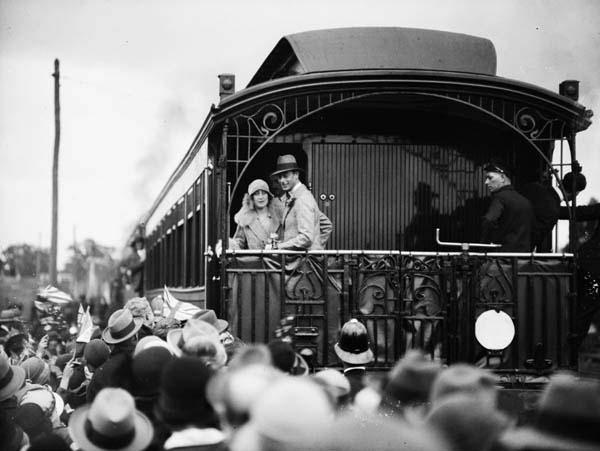
King George VI and Queen Elizabeth, then the Duke and Duchess of York, on the balcony of State Car 4 in 1927

- June 1867: The first royal train, drawn by engine No. 50, took Alfred, Duke of Edinburgh to Ballarat, then to Castlemaine and Bendigo. Recorded times for the 45 miles between Melbourne and Geelong were 52 to 60 minutes. [Leo J. Harrigan. Victorian Railways to '62. Victorian Railways. 1962. p 269]
- May 1901: The first complete royal train was assembled from special-purpose vehicles for the visit of the Duke and Duchess of Cornwall and York (later King George V and Queen Mary). The royal train travelled to Healesville and other parts of Victoria, and finally to Port Melbourne, where they embarked for the sea voyage to Brisbane.
- May/June 1920: The Prince of Wales (later briefly King Edward VIII) toured the state.
- 7 May 1927: The Duke and Duchess of York (later King George VI and Queen Elizabeth), who were visiting Australia to open Parliament House in Canberra, travelled from Melbourne to Geelong with A2 976 and to Seymour on 11 May with A2 948.
- 26–27 October 1934: The Duke of Gloucester (later Governor-General of Australia, 1945–1947) was taken from Bairnsdale to Melbourne for Melbourne's centenary celebrations.
- 31 October 1934: Duke of Gloucester to Mildura.
- February/March 1952: Planned tour by the then-Princess Elizabeth and Prince Philip. Cancelled due to the death of King George VI. Was to be operated by steam locomotive R704.
- 2 March 1958: The Queen Mother, from Ballarat to Melbourne, hauled by two S class locomotives
- 1959: Princess Alexandra
- 18 October 1965: Governor-General Lord Casey from his home station of Berwick on his first official visit to Melbourne. Train consisted of State Car 5 hauled by a diesel-electric locomotive.
- 27 October 1975: Princess Margaret, from Melbourne to Moe and return, hauled by electric locomotive L1150.
- 15 April 1983: Diana, Princess of Wales and Prince Charles from Spencer Street to Ballarat, returning empty to Melbourne. Locomotives S315 (crewed by driver Bill Steedman and fireman Danny Hallinan), S300 (leading) and S315 (trailing, hostlers end leading) headed the three-car train formed of an AZ car, observation car Norman (saloon trailing) and State Car 4 (observation deck trailing). S311 was the pilot locomotive (driver Kevin Whelan, fireman Vic Greensill) and ran between 31 and 33 minutes ahead of the Royal Train. A relief locomotive, X31, was at Bacchus Marsh (driver Ian R. Barkla, fireman Trevor Luxford).
- 28 April 1988: Queen Elizabeth II and the Duke of Edinburgh were conveyed from Spencer Street, Melbourne to South Geelong and returned. Pilot locomotive N469, crewed by driver Brian Ward and fireman Robert Hosie, ran 10 minutes ahead. The train was formed of double-headed locomotives N471 (crewed by driver Kevin Whelan and fireman Sean Kelly) and N474, leading a rake of ACZ 252 (van trailing), State Car 5 (kitchen end trailing), and Norman (round end trailing).

=== 1954 Royal Tour ===
For the tour of Elizabeth II and Philip, Duke of Edinburgh, the Royal Train ran over a period of six days in early March in two separate divisions. The first conveyed the couple, ladies-in-waiting and other dignitaries, and consisted of a combination of six steel and two wooden carriages, all in blue and gold livery, hauled by state-of-the-art diesel-electric locomotives B60 and B85. The second division consisted of Tait-era red sleeping, dining and ancillary carriages, conveying the media and other support staff behind the first division.

From the official operating circular, supported by photographs, the make-up of the 1954 Royal Train was:

- CE brakevan CE34
- 1927 steel dining car Avoca (which had been used in the 1927 royal train, and had since been fitted with airconditioning).
- Three AS airconditioned first-class compartment carriages, of Spirit of Progress style.
- Spirit of Progress dining car (the Spirit had to use a spare buffet car).
- State Car 5
- State Car 4

The locomotives were crewed by:

- Frank Myers, Victorian Railways Commissioners' driver (for over twenty years)
- Kevin Whelan, locomotive driver: Whelan had formerly been Myers' fireman during the delivery of the B class locomotives. Myers asked Whelan back for the Royal Tour as he could not find another suitable fireman for the role.

==== The itinerary ====
On 2 March, a shortened train (single B with four carriages, including state car 4 trailing) conveyed the Duke from Melbourne to Flinders Naval Depot. It was turned via the Crib Point triangle – a rare piece of track infrastructure on Victorian Railways – and returned to Melbourne. The Duke, a former navy officer, presented new colours to one of the units. Returning, he alighted at South Yarra, then by car to Government House. Next day, 3 March, the couple flew to Sale, Gippsland. The train ran empty to Sale to pick up the Queen and the Duke and return them to Melbourne, with a side trip to Yallourn. The following evening, at 5 pm on 4 March, the train took the royal couple to Goorambat, 132 miles from Melbourne on the Yarrawonga line, north of Benalla. The train was stabled there overnight.

The following day, the train returned to Benalla, where the royal couple left the train and travelled to Tatura with a road-motor convoy. The train then ran empty to Seymour, reversed, proceeded along the Goulburn Valley main line and diverged at Toolamba along the Toolamba–Echuca railway line, bound for Tatura. Here, the couple were picked up, and the train continued to Echuca, reversing there and heading south to Bendigo via the main line. After Bendigo, the train continued south to Castlemaine, then west via the cross-country line to Maryborough. The train then ran south to Waubra Junction, short of Ballarat, reversed and ran the short journey down the Waubra branch line to the Ballarat Racecourse Platform at approximately 81 miles (locally known as Dowling's Forest Racecourse). The train was again stabled overnight.

The following day, the train departed the racecourse and ran into Ballarat. The train then ran to Melbourne via Geelong, pausing at Aircraft station (adjacent to RAAF Laverton) before continuing though Melbourne to Warburton, where the Queen and the Duke of Edinburgh exited the Royal Train for the last time. The two divisions then returned empty to Spencer Street and stabled.
