= British Music Society =

Society promoting British classical music

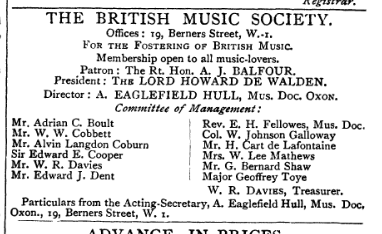
Opening notice of the British Music Society, from The Musical Times, August 1918 front matter

The British Music Society was first set up in 1918 by Arthur Eaglefield Hull to "advance the cause of British music at home and abroad". Its address was 19 Berners Street in London. The supporting committee included influential names such as Adrian Boult, W. W. Cobbett, E. J. Dent, E. H. Fellowes and George Bernard Shaw. The Society put on concerts and talks, set out to establish a catalogue of British music, and published a regular bulletin.

Elgar's Violin Sonata in E minor was first performed on 13 March 1919 at a semi-public meeting of the Society, performed by W. H. Reed with Anthony Bernard on piano. The first performance (in its orchestral version) of The Lark Ascending by Vaughan Williams was presented at a BMS concert in the Queen's Hall on 14 June 1921, with Marie Hall (soloist) and the British Symphony Orchestra conducted by Adrian Boult.

But the Society lapsed in 1928 after Eaglefield-Hull's death. By 1933 it had been dissolved, claiming it had fulfilled its original objectives of promoting British music and improving the standard of music and musical awareness in Britain.

Several local branches were established in the UK, such as the Todmorden Clef Club set up by Ronald Cunliffe in June 1920, and around the world, including one in Bangalore and one in Melbourne. The British Music Society of York was also an offshoot of the original BMS, and continues to operate today under that name.

The British Music Society as it is today was revived in 1979 and granted charitable status in 1995. It promotes and sponsors recordings (via its own original label and a more recent partnership with the Naxos record label) and issues printed publications, including a newsletter and the annual British Music Journal. There is also a biennial BMS Awards competition. The Society has around 600 members.

== See also ==
Society of British Musicians
