= Ronald Cunliffe =

English musician (1899–1944)

- Cunliffe in 1928
- Born: 14 November 1899; Todmorden, West Riding of Yorkshire, England
- Died: 2 April 1944 (aged 44); Tottenham, London, England
- Cause of death: Carbon monoxide poisoning (suicide)
- Occupations: Choirmaster, organist, music teacher, broadcaster, journalist
- Known for: Founder of the Todmorden Boys' Choir

Ronald Cunliffe (14 November 1899 – 2 April 1944) was an English choirmaster, organist, music educator, and BBC broadcaster. He achieved national and international prominence in the 1920s as the founder and director of the Todmorden Boys' Choir, which was noted for performing full-scale grand operas by composers such as Mozart and Rimsky-Korsakov without simplification. He later served as the long-time Music Master at The Latymer School in Edmonton, London, where he composed the school's official song, before joining the BBC full-time as a music broadcaster and writer.

== Early life and education ==
Ronald Cunliffe was born on 14 November 1899 at 10 Mount Pleasant in Todmorden, West Riding of Yorkshire, in an area then known as Cobden. He was the first child of John Cunliffe, a Walsden-born cotton weaver, and Lydia Ann Cunliffe (née Corbet). In June 1903, the family moved to 7 Cowfield Street, where his younger sister, Hilda, was born.

Cunliffe was educated at the local National School. At age six, he joined the Christ Church Choir and began taking singing and music lessons from William Alfred Wrigley, Mus. Bac. (Oxon), the church organist, choirmaster, and conductor of the Todmorden Musical Society. He also studied piano and music theory under J. Edward Parker FRCO, a local teacher based on York Street. In January 1912, as a pupil of Parker, Cunliffe gained 99 marks out of a possible 100 in the intermediate division (grade 2) musical knowledge examination conducted by the Trinity College of Music. In June 1913, he achieved a senior pass in pianoforte playing from the same institution.

Alongside his musical training, Cunliffe attended sessional classes at the Municipal Technical Schools. In 1916, he passed the third-year commercial course, earning a first-class pass with distinction in shorthand. He also received a distinction pass in the National Shorthand Association's examination at 60 words per minute. Upon finishing school, he was briefly employed as a trainee reporter by the local newspaper publishers Waddington and Sons at Fielden Square, writing for the ''Todmorden District News''.

In December 1919, Cunliffe completed his Grade V (higher advanced) examination in piano playing from the Incorporated Society of Musicians, held at the Manchester College of Technology. At the certification event, presided over by his former teacher W. A. Wrigley, Cunliffe was selected to play William Sterndale Bennett's ''Toccata in C minor'' and graduated with honours.

== Career ==
=== Early Career in Todmorden ===
==== Church organist appointments ====
a young Ronald Cunliffe conducting

In 1916, when the organist of St. Aidan's Church in Todmorden joined the military forces, Cunliffe took over the duties temporarily. In November 1917, upon reaching the age of 18, Cunliffe was called up for service in the First World War, and his close friend Stewart Dennett was appointed to take over his duties as organist and choirmaster.

In February 1922, Cunliffe (who was then serving as deputy organist at Todmorden Parish Church) was appointed organist and choirmaster at St. Paul's Church, Cross Stone. He succeeded A. J. Bracewell, who had held the post since 1887, and officially commenced his duties at Easter 1922.

Following the death of his former teacher W. A. Wrigley in 1923, the Todmorden Parish Church Committee reduced the pool of candidates for the vacant organist position to four applicants. Cunliffe was selected and appointed organist and choirmaster in June 1923.

In April 1925, Cunliffe submitted his resignation from the Parish Church post, stating he wished to secure some leisure time after two years of strenuous work, and intended to concentrate specifically on training boys' voices and planning an upcoming winter opera season. He completed his duties at the Parish Church at the end of June 1925 and was succeeded by John Crowther FRCO, who took over the role in July.

==== Todmorden Boys' Choir ====
The Todmorden Boys Choir (c. 1925)

On 27 March 1922, Cunliffe founded the Todmorden Boys' Choir. The initiative began in a room at the Old Endowed School near St. Mary's Church, with rehearsals later moving to Sobriety Hall three times a week. The choir maintained an open admissions policy; no formal voice test was required, and any boy showing basic intelligence, perseverance, and obedience was accepted. Within six weeks of starting, 37 boys had enrolled, and they gave their first demonstration after eight weeks. By August 1922, the choir numbered over 50 boys and was preparing for an inaugural autumn concert at the Todmorden Town Hall.

In August 1922, Cunliffe organised the choir into internal competition houses named in honour of four of the era's leading British composers: Granville Bantock, Gustav Holst, Ralph Vaughan Williams, and Edward Elgar. Cunliffe wrote to each composer requesting they write a brief, wordless "rally-cry, or slogan, or yodel" for their respective houses. Bantock, Holst, and Vaughan Williams responded promptly, with Vaughan Williams sending a six-note melody and Holst providing a four-bar excerpt from The Planets. Elgar initially did not reply, prompting a second appeal from Cunliffe in November 1922. In late December, Elgar sent a three-bar piece titled Solemn Fanfare, which included both a unison version and a three-part arrangement.

The choir's early repertoire consisted of traditional English and Irish folk songs, spirituals, and classical selections from composers such as Wagner, Puccini, and Rimsky-Korsakov. After performing at King's Hall in Littleborough, the choir was invited to Houldsworth Hall in Manchester for a mid-week concert that attracted an audience of over 500 and was broadcast by the BBC.

During the school summer holidays of 1923, Cunliffe hired a marquee-sized tent and established a five-week rehearsal camp at Middle Horswood Farm in Lumbutts. There, the boys rehearsed a version of Mozart's The Magic Flute, which Cunliffe had rearranged for treble and alto voices. The production was performed at the Dale Street Co-operative Hall at Easter 1924, and was staged again for a five-night run beginning on 30 September 1924. The performances received critical praise from Samuel Langford of The Manchester Guardian and attracted visitors including composer Granville Bantock and writer George Bernard Shaw.

On 31 March 1925, the choir opened a five-night run of Rimsky-Korsakov's The Golden Cockerel. Cunliffe translated and completely re-adapted the score for six-part boys' voices, and designed the stage sets. After attending a performance, Sydney Nicholson, the organist and Master of Choristers at Westminster Abbey, wrote an appreciative review for The Times, remarking that the sight of a "newspaper boy singing 'Coq d'Or'" signaled the potential for a truly national opera.

In late 1925, the choir prepared an ambitious winter repertory season consisting of four operas: The Magic Flute, The Golden Cockerel, Leoncavallo's Pagliacci, and Wolf-Ferrari's Susanna's Secret. However, on 28 November 1925, Cunliffe collapsed due to a severe ulcer illness during a performance at Wilmslow and was rushed to Manchester Royal Infirmary for surgery. Despite his absence, the three-week Christmas season went ahead as scheduled, with the boys performing the operas entirely without a conductor or prompter.

Following his recovery and decision to move to London to take up an appointment with the Boy Scouts' Association, the choir gave its final public performance at a charity concert in St. Edmund's Hall, Manchester, on 5 February 1926. The Todmorden Boys' Choir was officially disbanded at the conclusion of the season, having given over 100 concerts and 35 fully produced operatic performances during its five-and-a-half-year existence.

==== Todmorden Clef Club ====
In June 1920, Cunliffe published a letter to the editor proposing the establishment of a local branch of the British Music Society under the name of the Todmorden Music Club or the Todmorden Clef Club, aiming to bring local musicians and listeners together to perform and discuss works rarely heard on the concert platform. The inaugural meeting of the Todmorden Clef Club was subsequently held on 22 June 1920 at the Weaver's Institute. Cunliffe was appointed as the club's first honorary secretary, working alongside President W. A. Barker and Treasurer J. S. Pilling.

The club was designed as an educational rather than a performing body, charging an annual subscription of five shillings to build an extensive library of classical sheet music and host monthly piano recitals. Featured composers in their regular syllabus included Schubert, Schumann, Brahms, Mozart, Chopin, Debussy, and Beethoven, as well as British composers such as Elgar, Parry, Vaughan Williams, and Granville Bantock.

The club proved highly popular, with membership rising from 51 at its inception to over 320 by the end of its first season. At the first annual meeting in April 1921, Cunliffe declined re-election as secretary due to illness and a heavy workload, though he was elected to remain on the general committee.

Throughout his involvement with the club, Cunliffe frequently performed as a piano soloist and accompanist. At the club's second meeting in October 1920, he performed the piano part in Brahms's Quintet in F Minor, Op. 34 and accompanied soprano Annis Studd from memory. In March 1921, he performed as a soloist, playing Cyril Scott's Passacaglia, a Sterndale Bennett toccata, and John Ireland's The Holy Boy and The Island Spell. He also maintained a regular musical partnership with young local violinist Stewart Dennett, with whom he rehearsed and performed Eugene Goossens's Sonata in E minor for violin and piano at several club events.

=== The Latymer School, Edmonton (1927–1941) ===
In September 1927, Cunliffe was appointed by Richard Ashworth as the first Music Master at The Latymer School in Edmonton, London. The school governors selected him in the belief that he would bring a fresh and modern approach to music instruction in secondary education. Shortly after taking up his duties, Cunliffe composed the music for the official ''Latymer School Song'' (with lyrics written by English teacher Alice Linford), which was performed for the first time at the school's Speech Day in November 1927.

Cunliffe established a rigorous routine of daily singing, using the first fifteen minutes of each school day for morning assemblies. He accompanied the students on the Great Hall's Chappell grand piano, insisting on correct diction, clear pronunciation, and full open vocal production. During these assemblies, he also played classical piano pieces as the students filed into the hall, dedicating each week to a specific classical composer ranging from Bach and Beethoven to Chopin, Poulenc, and Cyril Scott.

He founded the Latymer Junior Boys' Choir, directing them in an advanced and highly varied repertoire that included Mozart, Schubert, Richard Strauss, Kurt Weill, Borodin's Polovtsian Dances, and Constant Lambert's The Rio Grande. Under Cunliffe's direction, the choir performed in the Concert Hall of the Royal College of Music, gave a special concert at the Victoria and Albert Museum under the chairmanship of Chief Inspector Dr. Geoffrey Shaw, and staged a highly publicised production of Mozart's The Magic Flute in 1935, which was attended by George Bernard Shaw. In addition to his choral work, Cunliffe composed incidental music for the school Dramatic Society's production of Sophocles' Electra and directed plays such as Shaw's Misalliance for the Latymer Players, an old students' amateur dramatic group. The Latymer choir also revived works from Cunliffe's Todmorden era; at a 1937 concert, they performed the musical fragment Elgar had written for the Todmorden Boys' Choir in 1922. A retrospective school memoir noted that the choir later broadcast this piece, recalling it as a dedicated fanfare.

Following the outbreak of the Second World War in September 1939, Latymer was evacuated to Clacton-on-Sea. On the march to Silver Street station, the students sang a custom parody of the school song written by Cunliffe to keep up their spirits. Although the school choir had historically been open only to boys, the disruptive conditions of the evacuation prompted Cunliffe to relent and allow girls to join the choir as well. When the school was re-evacuated to Tonypandy in South Wales in early 1940, Cunliffe insisted the choir learn the Welsh national anthem phonetically; their performance on arrival was highly praised by the local community.

Cunliffe suffered from chronic ill health throughout his years in London, having undergone three major operations for duodenal ulcers as well as suffering from a shrapnel wound from the First World War, this prevented him from teaching fully. In 1941, as the school underwent wartime adjustments and his health continued to decline, he was made redundant from his position. The redundancy was met with disappointment and regret by many of his former pupils, who felt he was treated unsympathetically by the school authorities.

=== BBC career and journalism ===
In the summer of 1942, after being made redundant from his teaching post at Edmonton, Cunliffe joined the BBC full-time, working in the department of recorded programmes. He became a regular writer and broadcaster, presenting talks and playing the piano on several programs. He was best known for his contributions to the Sunday morning series "Music Lovers' Calendar" on the BBC Home Service, and "Music for Schools" on weekday afternoons. He was also engaged by the Forces programme to present music talks and perform as a pianist for the "Forces Music Club".

Cunliffe also developed a career as a radio dramatist and writer. In early 1943, he completed a full-length radio feature titled The House of the Dead, which was broadcast twice on shortwave to Brazil, with subsequent transmissions broadcast in Spanish. Throughout this period, he maintained active connections with print journalism, writing articles for several national music magazines and occasionally serving as a guest deputy music critic for the Daily Mail.

Shortly before his death in early 1944, Cunliffe was preparing a specialised radio program and collecting research materials for a full biography of the English composer William Baines, whose piano music he highly admired. Although the book and the broadcast remained unfinished at his death, his research notes and draft scripts were preserved. In May 1945, broadcaster Alec Robertson utilised Cunliffe's completed script to deliver a tribute broadcast on Baines during "Music Lovers' Calendar," paying public tribute to Cunliffe's scholarship and musical insight.

== Personal life and death ==
Cunliffe never married. Prior to moving to London, he lived with his mother and sister, Hilda, at 13 Stansfield Street, Todmorden. In London, he maintained a registered address at 12 Ranelagh Drive, Edgware, but resided at 262 Philip Lane, Tottenham. In May 1937, while living in Tottenham, he was fined £1 by the Tamworth magistrates for driving a motor car above the 30 mph speed limit in a built-up area.

Throughout his adult life, Cunliffe suffered from chronic ill health and possessed a fragile constitution, experiencing several physical breakdowns that were exacerbated by overwork. He suffered from recurrent duodenal ulcers, which required three separate surgeries and left him in persistent, severe physical pain. On Sunday, 2 April 1944, Cunliffe committed suicide by carbon monoxide poisoning from coal gas at his Tottenham home. He was found in a gas-filled room and died shortly after in the hospital, at the age of 44.

The coroner's inquest recorded a verdict that Cunliffe took his own life while the balance of his mind was disturbed, noting that he left a suicide note explaining the physical agony and mental distress caused by his chronic illnesses. Following his death, Todmorden Parish Church was decorated with daffodils by his mother and sister in his memory, and a memorial remembrance was made during the Easter service.

== Bibliography ==
- Granath, Andrew (1995). Latymer Remembered Memories Of Latymer School 1882 – 1945. The Latymer Foundation at Edmonton. ISBN 0950541524.
