= Leuralla =

Historic house in Leura, NSW, Australia

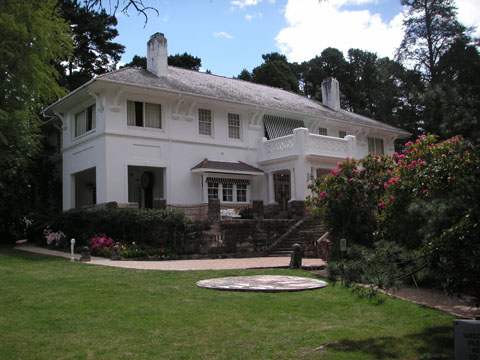
- Interactive map of the Leuralla area

General information
- Type: House
- Architectural style: Federation Free Classical
- Location: 36 Olympian Parade; Leura, New South Wales
- Coordinates: 33°43′29″S 150°19′47″E
- Construction started: 1910
- Completed: 1914
- Governing body: The Evatt Family

Design and construction
- Architects: Edward Hewlett Hogben (1875–1936)

Website
- Leuralla Toy & Railway Museum

Leuralla is a historic house in Leura, a suburb in the Blue Mountains, in New South Wales, Australia. It was the location of the Leuralla Toy & Railway Museum, which closed in 2022.

The present house was built between 1910 and 1914 and was designed by architect Edward Hewlett Hogben. The garden was developed around the 1914 house and is 5 hectares (12 acres) in size. A formal garden lay out was used originally by Andreas and later Paul Sorensen improved the garden overall. An amphitheatre is located on the edge of the escarpment and overlooks the Jamison Valley.

== Background ==
Leuralla was built for the independently wealthy yachtsman and big-game fisherman Harry Andreas (1879 – 1955), his wife Alice and their young family. Harry and Alice Andreas lived at Leuralla until after World War II. In 1928, Clive Evatt QC (1900 – 1984) married Marjorie Andreas, a daughter, of Harry and Alice, and the Evatt family connection to the property began. Clive Evatt Jnr, an Andreas grandson, managed the property. Clive Evatt and his wife, Elizabeth Evatt, are the founders of the present museum. They are responsible for the exhibition of H.V. Evatt QC KStJ (1894 – 1965) memorabilia and for the toy and railway collection displayed in various buildings. Herbert Vere Evatt was Clive Evatt Snr's brother but had no particular connection with Leuralla and had a home of his own in Leura.

== House and out-buildings ==
In 1903 a house, known as Leuralla, was built on the current site but was destroyed by bushfire in 1909. Between 1910 and 1914 the present house was built and the design was influenced by the work of Frank Lloyd Wright. The house is an example of an early 20th Century permanent residence for a wealthy family. It is an imposing two-storey house set in extensive grounds in the Federation Free Classical style and is notable for its entry portico and stair, symmetry, and bracketed cornice. The walls and chimneys are rendered and the building is on a rockfaced sandstone base. Leuralla has a hipped roof with short projecting hipped wings on the southern and northern sides. The wide external sandstone staircase which has twin flights from the ground under a single storey portico. The portico is topped by a first floor balcony with balustrading. Doric columns complement the entry and the front door is multi-paned and has sidelights. There are symmetrically placed hipped roof bay windows on the northern and southern sides of the portico. The roof is covered in slate and ridged in terracotta. The garage has Federation Anglo-Dutch style influences and its walls are shingled with a weatherboard spandrel. There is a single-storeyed sandstone outbuilding with a gabled roof on the Olympian Parade side of the grounds.

== Garden and amphitheatre ==
Andreas established an exotic garden from his earliest ownership of Leuralla and much of it was saved from the 1909 bushfire. It was redeveloped around the 1914 house and is still 5 hectares (12 acres) in size. A formal garden lay out was used originally by Andreas and later Paul Sorensen improved the garden overall. There is a sculpture garden on the south side of Olympian Parade. The amphitheatre on the edge of the escarpment takes advantages of its spectacular setting overlooking the Jamieson Valley.

== Distinguished guests ==
As the home of the Katoomba Music Society in the 1930s, Leuralla hosted numerous interesting musical guests including: the internationally renowned pianist Solomon Cutner CBE, known as The Great Solomon; the composer and conductor Sir Eugene Goosens; and music critic and cricket commentator Sir Neville Cardus CBE. During the 1927 Royal Tour of Australasia, Harry Andreas had acted as a fishing guide for The Duke and Duchess of York (later King George VI and Queen Elizabeth) in the Bay of Islands, whilst the young Princess "Lillibet" was at home in London.

== Toy and railway museum ==
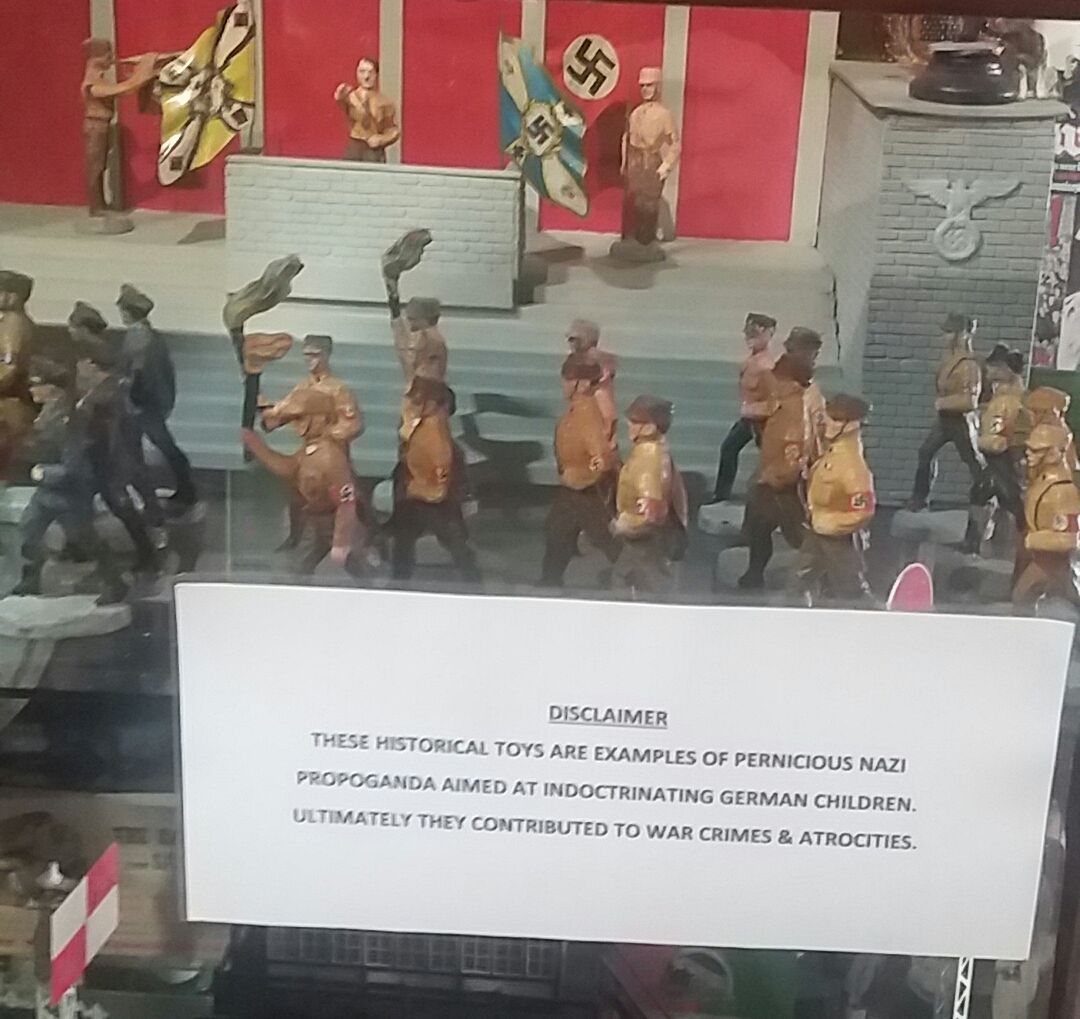
Nazi-themed toys at Leuralla with disclaimer

Leuralla housed a toy museum from 1980 to 2022. It included a collection of toys, children's literature, games and models from the 20th Century. Items included rare tinplate trains, airplanes, zeppelins, ships, automobiles, lead and elastolin figures, as well as working model train layouts complete with train station, harbour, farm & garden and military scenes.

Represented characters included Alice in Wonderland, Tintin, Babar, Winnie the Pooh, Noddy and Rupert Bear, Popeye, James Bond, Action Man, Barbie and Harry Potter. Important dolls, teddybears and stuffed animals, Meccano, construction kit, games and jigsaws, children's literature & comics were also represented. The grounds feature an outdoor display of model trains and original ephemera from NSW railways such as signage, benches and station contents, which were being removed and disposed of in the 1980s. The house also features a commemorative museum to the great Australian politician, intellectual and statesman Dr. H V Evatt.

The museum included a display of Nazi-themed toys that were used to indoctrinate children in the German Nazi era. A sign at the display said that the museum "disclaims and condemns" such use and that they are shown for public knowledge. After the closure of the museum in 2022, the Nazi-themed toys were excluded from the sale of the collection.

== See also ==
- National Transport and Toy Museum in Wānaka, New Zealand
- Nuremberg Toy Museum
