= Harry Andreas =

Australian businessman

- Born: 5 March 1879; Sydney
- Died: 21 May 1955; Bowral, New South Wales
- Education: Newington College
- Known for: Big-game fishing
- Spouse: Alice May (née Burton)
- Children: 2 daughters & 2 sons
- Parent(s): Hanna (née Denning) and Phillip Andreas
- Relatives: Son-in-law; Clive Evatt QC; Grandchildren; Clive Evatt Jnr; Elizabeth Evatt AC; Penelope Seidler AO.

Harry Andreas (born Ehenriech Phillip Andreas; 1879–1955) was an Australian businessman and company director. As a big-game fisherman he pioneered the sport in New Zealand. He was the inventor of the Andreas Fortuna Game Fish Reel and is described in the 1935 edition of Who's Who in Australia as being of "Independent Means".

== Birth and education ==
Harry Andreas was born in Sydney, the first son of Australian-born Hannah (née Denning) and English-born Phillip Ehenriech Andreas. His younger brother, Charles Denning Andreas (1880 – 1882), died as an infant. During his childhood, the Andreas family lived in Palace Street, Petersham, New South Wales. Andreas was educated at Newington College (1891–1895) where he was a talented sportsman and shot. In 1893, he competed in the Queen's Rifle Shoot at Bisley, England whilst still at Newington.

== Sportsman ==
From his earliest years out of school, Andreas is notable as a sportsman with his activities chronicled by the Sydney Morning Herald and other newspapers.

== Leura and Kirribilli ==
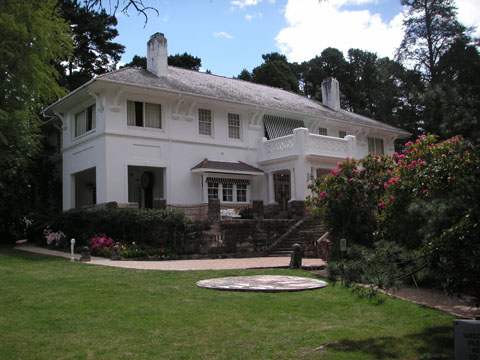
Leuralla – the Andreas family home in Leura

Leuralla was Andreas's house in Leura. In 1903 a house was built on the current site but was destroyed by bushfire in 1909. Between 1910 and 1914 the present house was built and is a notable example of an early 20th Century holiday residence for a wealthy family. The property is being sold by the family and previously housed a toy and railway museum. Andreas also maintained a family residence on Sydney Harbour at Elamang Avenue, Kirribilli.

== Inventor and businessman ==
In 1905, Andreas Applied to the Commonwealth Commissioner of Patents to register his improvements to an acetylene generator. Only 46 of his "Fortuna Reel Andreas Pat. No 123405/18 & 19 Ex Wide" were produced between 1934 and 1936 and one was sold at auction in London on 14 July 2012 for £5,200. His friend and fellow Old Newingtonian, George Harker, was the inventor of a patented system of extinguishing fires at sea and fumigation and in 1908 when the Harker Fire Extinguisher and Fumigator Company was formed Andreas became a director.

== Royal connections ==
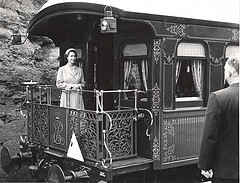
Queen Elizabeth II arriving in Leura for her visit to Leuralla

During the 1927 Royal Tour of Australasia, Andreas acted as a fishing guide for The Duke and Duchess of York (later King George VI and Queen Elizabeth) in the Bay of Islands. Whilst her parents were fishing with Andreas the young Princess Elizabeth (later Queen Elizabeth II) was at home in London but during the 1954 Royal Visit to Australia, Andreas welcomed Her Majesty and His Royal Highness The Duke of Edinburgh as guests at Leuralla.

== Old Newingtonian ==
From as early as 1906, Andreas was the Country Vice-president in Leura for the Old Newingtonians' Union (ONU) and he continued to serve in that position until his death in 1955. Andreas presented annually a Hardy Brothers medal to the Newington College boy who was the highest scorer in the AAGPS shooting competition. From 1956 until 1969 the Andreas Medal continued to be presented in his honour by the ONU. In 1994 the Andreas Medal was funded in perpetuity by his grandchildren.

== Family and death ==
In 1902, Andreas married Alice May Burton, the daughter of William Henry Burton of Leicester, England. The marriage produced two sons and two daughters: Marjorie, Mrs. Clive Evatt; Phillip Andreas; Lucy, Mrs. Erling Aargaard; and William Andreas. Alice Andreas died, aged 73, in Leura in 1952. Harry Andreas died in Bowral, New South Wales, survived by his four children.
