= Melanoma Institute Australia =

Australian non-profit

- Formation: 2007
- Legal status: Non-profit organisation
- Purpose: Melanoma research and treatment
- Headquarters: Sydney, Australia
- Key people: Alexander van Akkooi
- Main organ: Charles Perkins Centre
- Affiliations: University of Sydney
- Website: melanoma.org.au

The Melanoma Institute Australia is a non-profit organisation based at the Poche Centre in North Sydney, Australia which focuses on the prevention of and cure for melanoma through research, treatment and education programs. The institute is affiliated with The University of Sydney and St Vincent’s and Mater Health Sydney. It relies on funding from individuals, organisations and government grants.

== History ==
In 1957, a paper in the Medical Journal of Australia demonstrated the link between sunlight exposure and melanoma. This led the late Professor Gerald Milton to set up the Sydney Melanoma Clinic at Sydney Hospital. In 1983 the clinic moved to Royal Prince Alfred Hospital and was renamed the Sydney Melanoma Unit. In 2007, the Sydney Melanoma Unit became Melanoma Institute Australia and in 2010, the Institute moved into the Poche Centre, which was funded by a $40 million donation from Greg Poche.

== Research ==
Research at the Melanoma Institute Australia aims to increase understanding of the genetic and molecular causes of melanoma. Researchers have access to the contents of BioSpecimen Bank, a collection of over 1,800 tissue samples and 4,000 blood samples that were collected from consenting people with melanoma and other types of skin cancer across New South Wales. The Bank also contains information about the health and treatment of these donors.

== Award and recognition ==
Conjoint Medical Directors of the Institute, Professor Richard Scolyer and Professor Georgina Long, were awarded the Excellence in Translational Cancer Research award in the 2017 NSW Premier's Awards for Outstanding Cancer Research. In 2003 Profs Scolyer and Long were named NSW Australian(s) of The Year and in 2024 they were named Australian(s) of the Year.

== See also ==
- Australian Melanoma Research Foundation
- Cancer Council Australia
