= Cancer Council Victoria =

Australian nonprofit organisation

- Purpose: Cancer control
- Location: Victoria
- Region served: Australia
- Key people: Todd Harper, CEO
- Website: www.cancervic.org.au
- Formerly called: The Anti-Cancer Council of Victoria, The Cancer Council Victoria

Cancer Council Victoria is a not-for-profit organisation which aims to reduce the impact of cancer in Victoria. It is an independent body that advises various groups, including government, on cancer-related issues. Cancer Council Victoria also conducts and funds cancer research, acts as an advocate for cancer patients and their families, and runs cancer prevention, education and support programs.

Formerly known as The Anti-Cancer Council of Victoria, in 2002 the organisation rebranded itself as The Cancer Council Victoria. In 2008, 'The' was dropped from the name, giving the organisation its current name of 'Cancer Council Victoria'.

Its logo is the daffodil, used to symbolise hope.

== History ==
The Anti-Cancer Council of Victoria was established by the Victorian Government in 1936 through the Anti-Cancer Council Act. This act specified that the newly established council should remain independent of the government.

Sir Edward "Weary" Dunlop and Sir Peter MacCallum have been notable Chairs of the Cancer Council Executive Committee. Ivy Brookes was vice-president of the organisation for 30 years.

Cancer Council Victoria has a long history of anti-smoking advocacy, dating back to the early 1960s, even pre-dating the landmark 1964 US General Surgeon's Report on links between tobacco and cancer.

== Significant contributions to cancer control ==
Cancer Council Victoria has contributed to cancer control in a number of areas. Of particular note:

- Cancer Council Victoria awarded the Carden Fellowship to Professor Donald Metcalf AC in 1954. Working as the Carden Fellow, Professor Metcalf went on to discover and develop colony-stimulating factors, which have since been used in the treatment of millions of cancer patients around the world.
- Cancer Council Victoria pioneered the comprehensive information and support system now used throughout Australia, Canada, and Singapore.
- Cancer Council Victoria partnered with La Trobe University to develop specialised post-graduate training for nurses to provide tailored care for breast cancer patients.
- The iconic Slip-Slop-Slap skin cancer prevention campaign was developed at Cancer Council Victoria, and was launched in 1981. Reports have found the Slip-Slop-Slap campaign is one of the most cost-effective and successful public health initiatives in Australia.
- Quit Victoria is a joint initiative of Cancer Council Victoria, VicHealth, the Victorian Department of Health and the National Heart Foundation of Australia. Quit encourages smoking cessation and campaigns have proven effective in encouraging people to try to quit.
- The Victorian Cancer Registry is a part of Cancer Council Victoria, and since 1982 has kept statistical records of cancer in Victoria for use in epidemiological research and in policy development. The registry provides regular reports for the general public and more comprehensive data is available for researchers who require it.

== Research ==
In 2009, Cancer Council Victoria spent $22.4 million on research programs. In 2010, $20.1 million was spent on research. Much of this research is conducted at Cancer Council Victoria itself, through the Centre for Behavioural Research in Cancer, Cancer Epidemiology Centre, and the Tobacco Control Unit.

Cancer Council Victoria funds clinical research into cancers of the bone, bowel, brain, breast, liver, lung, prostate, stomach and any other form of the disease.

In 2010 Cancer Council Victoria research was recognised by the SCImago Research Group as some of Australia's best. SCImago measured the rate at which an institute's research is the result of international collaboration and the rate at which it is published in high-quality journals – in both measures Cancer Council Victoria was in Australia's top five. In a measure of the rate at which Cancer Council Victoria's research is cited by other research institutes, the organisation was ranked number one in Australia, scoring 2.51 times the international average.

== Support and prevention ==
In 2009, Cancer Council Victoria spent $22.4 million on education, prevention and support initiatives. In 2010 this amount had risen to $27 million.

Cancer Council Victoria has offered an information service to Victorians since 1940. Today, Cancer Council Victoria runs the Cancer Information and Support Service, which offers multi-lingual telephone support through the Cancer Council Helpline, online support through cancerconnections.com.au, one-on-one peer support through Cancer Connect, and a variety of other initiatives.

Cancer Council Victoria also facilitates or assists partner organisations in a variety of preventive programs and campaigns, such as:

- Quit Victoria
- SunSmart
- PapScreen Victoria
- Get Behind Bowel Screening
- Cut Your Cancer Risk
- The Parents Jury
- The Obesity Policy Coalition
- The Alcohol Policy Coalition

== Fundraising ==
Cancer Council Victoria works within Cancer Council Australia and alongside other states and territories to run a variety of fundraising events, such as:

- Australia's Biggest Morning Tea
- Relay For Life
- Daffodil Day
- Call To Arms
- Girls Night In

== Structure ==
Cancer Council Victoria is one of eight Cancer Council's from around Australia which make up Cancer Council Australia. Each individual Cancer Council operates in their individual states and territories:

- Cancer Council ACT
- Cancer Council New South Wales
- Cancer Northern Territory
- Cancer Council Queensland
- Cancer Council South Australia
- Cancer Council Tasmania
- Cancer Council Victoria
- Cancer Council Western Australia

== See also ==
- Australian Melanoma Research Foundation
