= Cancer Council Australia =

Australian nonprofit organisation

- Founded: 1961; 65 years ago
- Type: Non-profit
- Registration no.: ABN 91130793725
- Legal status: Charity
- Purpose: A cancer-free future
- Location: Sydney, Australia
- Region served: Australia
- Key people: Jacinta Reddan, CEO
- Revenue: $31,735,240 (2024)
- Expenses: $31,056,365 (2024)
- Employees: 32
- Volunteers: 0
- Website: www.cancer.org.au
- Formerly called: Australian Cancer Society

Cancer Council Australia is a national, nonprofit organisation which aims to promote cancer-control policies and to reduce the illness caused by cancer in Australia. It advises various groups, including the government, on cancer-related issues, acts as an advocacy group for cancer patients and their friends, and is a major funding contributor towards health research, prevention and education.

== Background ==
Cancer Council Australia formed in 1961 as an incorporated association trading as Australian Cancer Society, when the six state cancer councils, of which had separate identities, agreed to federate with the goal 'to promote cancer control at the national level.' (Note: As per Cancer Council Australia, 'Cancer control refers to actions to reduce the impact of cancer on people including: reducing cancer risk and incidence; improving early detection and treatment; and improving care and support for people affected by cancer.') The cancer councils of the Australian Capital Territory and the Northern Territory were subsequently formed and joined the Society. In 1997, all eight members agreed to expand the Society and rebrand as The Cancer Council Australia and appointed Alan Coates its inaugural CEO. By 2008, the organisation migrated from an incorporated association to become a registered company, dropping 'The' from its name and rebranding as Cancer Council Australia, which it has since retained.

Cancer Council Australia includes eight member organisations, which operate in their individual states and territories:

- Cancer Council Australian Capital Territory
- Cancer Council New South Wales
- Cancer Council Northern Territory
- Cancer Council Queensland
- Cancer Council South Australia
- Cancer Council Tasmania
- Cancer Council Victoria
- Cancer Council Western Australia

=== Dietary advice ===
Cancer Council Australia recommends a diet rich in plant-based foods to prevent cancer such as at least two servings of fruit and five servings of vegetables, including legumes and at least four servings of whole grains per day. They also encourage people to consume at least two and a half servings of dairy products per day and at least two servings of oily fish per week. Cancer Council Australia recommends consuming no more than 455g per week of lean, cooked red meat and to limit processed meat and red meat intake as there is evidence that it increases the risk of bowel cancer.

== Events ==
=== Australia's Biggest Morning Tea ===
One of Cancer Council's major fundraisers is Australia's Biggest Morning Tea. On 26 May 2005, the event broke the Guinness Book of Records record for the "World's Largest Simultaneous Tea Party (multiple venues)" with around 280,246 people participating at 6,062 locations and $7 million raised for charity.

=== Daffodil Day ===
Daffodil Day is the Australian Cancer Council's most iconic fund-raising event for cancer research. It takes place in August each year.

=== Junk Free June ===
Junk Free June was a fundraiser held in 2016, prioritising healthy habits and supporting Cancer Council Queensland's work in cancer research. Junk Free June encouraged participants to give up junk food such as packaged snacks high in sugar, refined carbohydrates and trans fats. According to World Cancer Research Fund International, approximately one third of the most common cancers can be prevented through a nutritious diet and maintaining a healthy weight and regular physical activity.

== Legacy ==
The Cancer Council has contributed a lot to Australia's society by helping people who are suffering with cancer or any cancerous illness. The Clive Deverall Society was launched in 2004 by the Cancer Council Western Australia as a way of thanking people who have included a gift in their Will to Cancer Council Western Australia.

== See also ==
- Australian Melanoma Research Foundation
- Cancer Institute of New South Wales
