= New South Wales Premier's Award =

New South Wales Premier's Award, NSW Premier's Prize, or variations thereof, may refer to:

- New South Wales Premier's History Awards
- New South Wales Premier's Literary Awards
- NSW Premier's Prizes for Science & Engineering
- Cancer Institute NSW Premier's Awards for Outstanding Cancer Research
