= Alan Coates =

Australian clinical oncologist

Alan Coates AM FRACP
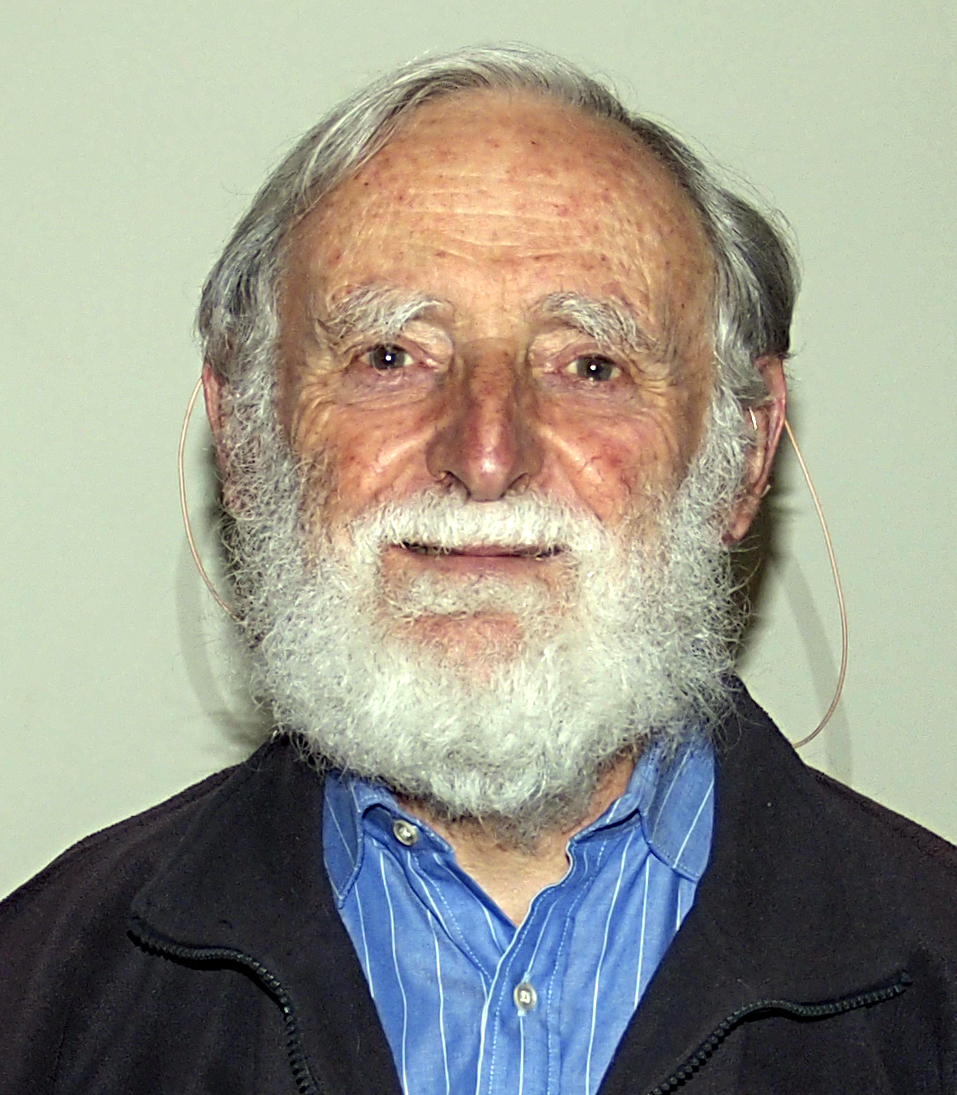
- Alan Coates (2015)
- Born: 27 June 1943 (age 83); Kew, Victoria, Australia
- Education: University of Melbourne
- Awards: Order of Australia
- Scientific career
- Fields: Clinical Oncology
- Workplaces: University of Sydney; Garvan Institute; Cancer Council Australia
- Voice introduction recorded July 2015

Alan Stuart Coates (born 27 June 1943) is an Australian professor of clinical oncology, medical researcher and administrator. He was the inaugural CEO of the Cancer Council Australia (1998–2006), former president of the Clinical Oncological Society of Australia (COSA), and co-chair of the St. Gallen International Breast Cancer Conference. He was also the first non-American to be elected to the board of directors of the American Society of Clinical Oncology.

== Medical training and practice ==
Coates graduated from the University of Melbourne in 1966 with a Bachelor of Medicine, Bachelor of Surgery (MBBS) degree and trained in internal medicine and immunology at the Royal Melbourne Hospital and the Walter and Eliza Hall Institute for Medical Research in Australia, then at the Wisconsin Clinical Cancer Center in the United States. He returned to Australia in 1978 and was a medical oncologist at the Royal Prince Alfred Hospital, Sydney. In 1985, he was appointed Associate Professor in Cancer Medicine in the University of Sydney. Since 1998 he has been a Clinical Professor at that university in the School of Public Health. He is an accredited statistician (AStat) with the Statistical Society of Australia and is a Fellow of the Royal Australasian College of Physicians (FRACP).

== Cancer research ==
Coates' research specialises in melanoma, breast cancer and tumour immunology. He is a visiting scientist at the Garvan Institute of Medical Research and the Kinghorn Cancer Centre in Sydney. His collaborations with international organisations in clinical trials include the European Institute of Oncology, Milan, and the Dana–Farber Cancer Institute in Boston, USA.

During his term as CEO of the Australian Cancer Council he was responsible for reports to Australia's National Health and Medical Research Council, Senate Inquiries and briefing the Minister for Health.

Coates was until 2015 a co-chair of the biennial St. Gallen Breast Cancer Conference and one of the primary authors of its resulting "consensus paper", a publication that is the "...clinically useful updated breast cancer treatment consensus for the majority of patients treated outside of clinical trials (>90%) in most countries."

His published research papers appear in Annals of Oncology, Breast Cancer Research and Treatment, Journal of Clinical Oncology, The Lancet Oncology and The New England Journal of Medicine.

== Awards and recognition ==
External videos
- Interview on targeted breast cancer treatment, Milan Breast Cancer Conference (2008)
- Discussing screening for prostate cancer on Insight (2010)
- "The evolution of the St. Gallen consensus process for the optimal treatment of women with breast cancer": Opening address at the St. Gallen Breast Cancer Conference (2015)

- 2002, appointed Member of the Order of Australia for "service to medicine in the field of oncology, particularly through breast cancer research".
- 2003, the Medical Oncology Group of Australia Pierre Fabre Cancer Achievement Award lecture.
- 2006, the American Society for Clinical oncology (ASCO) Distinguished Service Award for Scientific Leadership; the gold medal of the Australian Cancer Society; the Tom Reeve Oration Award of the Clinical Oncological Society of Australia (COSA)
- 2015, the St.Gallen Breast Cancer Award for his "commitment to international scientific trials and his focus on the quality of life of women afflicted with this cancer".

The Australia & New Zealand Breast Cancer Trials Group (ANZBCTG) offers an annual award "The Alan Coates Award for Excellence in Clinical Trials Research".

The "Alan Coates Cancer Centre" in Dubbo, New South Wales, part of the Western Local Health District, has a Chemotherapy Unit that provides outpatient chemotherapy for adult patients and multidisciplinary teams that consider patient management and treatment options.

== Bellringing ==
Alan (right background, conducting) and Maryon Coates (right foreground) teaching bellringing at St James' Church, Sydney. (2014)

Coates is an accomplished church bell change ringer and member of the Australian and New Zealand Association of Bellringers (ANZAB). He rang his first full peal in 2008, has rung approximately 244 quarter peals and conducted 53.

== Personal ==
Coates and his twin brother Roger were born on 27 June 1943 at St George's Hospital in Kew, Victoria to parents Thomas and Joan (née Courtney-Pratt) Coates, who had been married the previous year. Younger brother Gordon was born three years later on Boxing Day in the same hospital. On 2 January 1967, Coares married Marylon Slade Bodkin, who was born in Canberra 31 August 1943. They have three children. Also a bellringer and statistician, Marylon Coates is the author of many statistical studies on the incidence and mortality rates from cancer in Australia.

External videos
- "St Mary's Cathedral Rescue" Nine News Sydney (24 April 2015) via YouTube

In 2015 Coates survived a serious heart attack while at bellringing practice in St Mary's Cathedral and had to be winched down on a stretcher by abseiling rescuers through a trapdoor in the floor of the tower. It was impossible to take him down via the normal route of 120 steps in a narrow circular stairwell. The persistence and skill of his ringing companions, St Mary's Tower Captain Murray-Luke Peard and bellringer Mark Ferguson, were credited with saving his life by immediately administering cardiopulmonary resuscitation CPR. In recognition of this, ANZAB now provides for first-aid and CPR training for two members in each belltower. Coates had suffered a heart attack 15 years previously, when in full academic dress at Sydney University, preparing to participate in a graduation ceremony for medical students.
