= Cancer Council Queensland =

Australian nonprofit organisation

Cancer Council Queensland is Queensland's foremost anti-cancer organisation. It is an independent, community-based charity and is not government funded. Cancer Council aims to reduce the impact of cancer—particularly the suffering it causes—and ultimately to eliminate the disease, by raising funds to advance cancer research; improve cancer treatment; support people with cancer, their family and friends; and increase community awareness of cancer, its prevention and early detection. Cancer Council Queensland is a member of The Cancer Council Australia.

Cancer Council Queensland is the largest non-government provider of cancer research funds in the state. It has a dedicated research centre, the Viertel Centre for Research in Cancer Control, which includes an Epidemiology Unit, a Psycho-Oncology Research Unit, and the Queensland Cancer Registry.

== Fundraising ==
Because it does not receive government funding, Cancer Council Queensland receives donations from the Queensland public, through bequests and fundraising events. Cancer Council Queensland works within Cancer Council Australia and alongside other states and territories to run a variety of fundraising events, such as:

- Australia’s Biggest Morning Tea
- Relay For Life
- Daffodil Day
- Call To Arms
- Girls Night In
- The Star Gold Coast

Other fundraisers include the Challenge for Cancer, Dress Down Day and Clip for Cancer.

== History ==
Cancer Council Queensland was established in 1961 as the Queensland Cancer Fund. Its original purpose was to purchase medical equipment for the Queensland Radium Institute, a part of the state health department. On 1 May 2007, the Queensland Cancer Fund was renamed to Cancer Council Queensland and adopted the daffodil, the international symbol of hope, as its logo. It replaced the caduceus, a staff with an entwined snake, which was its original logo. The name change more closely aligned the organisation with other states and territories of Australia, all of which have an anti-cancer organisation named Cancer Council, all of which are members of Cancer Council Australia.

== See also ==
- Australian Melanoma Research Foundation
