= Donald Metcalf =

Australian medical researcher (1929–2014)

- Born: 26 February 1929
- Died: 15 December 2014 (aged 85); Melbourne, Australia
- Known for: discovering the colony stimulating factors
- Awards: FRS (1983); James Cook Medal (1985); Robert Koch Prize (1988); Louisa Gross Horwitz Prize (1993); Lasker Award (1993); Royal Medal (1995); Prime Minister's Prizes for Science (2001)
- Scientific career
- Fields: medicine
- Workplaces: Walter and Eliza Hall Institute of Medical Research
- Website: www.wehi.edu.au/about-history/notable-scientists/professor-don-metcalf

Donald Metcalf AC FRS FAA (26 February 1929 – 15 December 2014) was an Australian medical researcher who spent most of his career at the Walter and Eliza Hall Institute of Medical Research in Melbourne. In 1954 he received the Carden Fellowship from the Anti-Cancer Council of Victoria; while he officially retired in 1996, he continued working and held his fellowship until his death in December 2014.

== Education, research and career ==
Metcalf studied medicine at the University of Sydney, and had his first experience of medical research in the laboratory of Professor Patrick de Burgh. In 1954 Metcalf was awarded a Carden Fellowship from the Anti-Cancer Council of Victoria at the Walter and Eliza Hall Institute of Medical Research. There he initially studied virology and leukemia, later transitioning to hematology.

Metcalf's pioneering research revealed the control of blood cell formation and the role of hematopoietic cytokines. In the 1960s he developed techniques to culture blood cells, which led to the discovery of colony-stimulating factors (CSFs), including macrophage colony-stimulating factor, granulocyte colony-stimulating factor and granulocyte macrophage colony-stimulating factor. CSFs are cytokines that control white blood cell formation and are responsible for resistance to infection. CSFs are now widely used to boost the immune system for patients receiving chemotherapy, and to mobilise blood stem cells for transplants.

== Awards and honours ==
In the Australia Day Honours of 1976, he was named an Officer of the Order of Australia (AO). In the Queen's Birthday Honours of 1993, he was promoted to Companion of the Order (AC).

Metcalf has been awarded many international prizes including

- the 1986 Royal Society Wellcome Prize (now the GlaxoSmithKline Prize),
- the 1987 Bristol-Myers Award for Distinguished Achievement in Cancer Research (jointly with Leo Sachs),
- the 1988 Robert Koch Prize,
- the 1988 Armand Hammer Prize for Cancer Research,
- the 1989 General Motors Cancer Foundation Sloan Prize,
- the 1993 Lasker-DeBakey Clinical Medical Research Award,
- the 1993 Louisa Gross Horwitz Prize from Columbia University,
- the 1994 Jessie Stevenson Kovalenko Medal from the United States National Academy of Sciences,
- the 1994 Gairdner Foundation International Award,
- the 1995 Royal Society Royal Medal and,
- in 1997, a Lifetime Achievement Award from the American Association for Cancer Research,
- In 2008, Grand Hamdan International Award - Stem Cell Research.

In Australia Metcalf has received the 1985 James Cook Medal, the 2000 Victoria Prize, the 2001 Prime Minister's Prize for Science and the Centenary Medal.

== Personal life ==
Metcalf has four daughters and six grandchildren. He lived in Melbourne with his wife, Josephine, and died on 15 December 2014 following pancreatic cancer.

His autobiography Summon up the Blood: In dogged pursuit of the blood cell regulators was published in 2000.
