= Georgina Long =

Australian oncologist and researcher

Georgina Long AO FRACP FAHMS
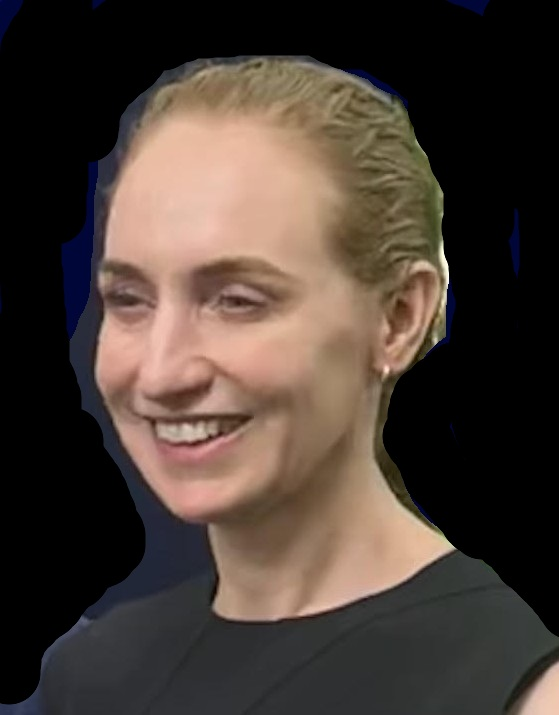
- Born: Sydney, Australia
- Education: University of Sydney
- Occupation: Oncologist
- Employer(s): Melanoma Institute Australia; University of Sydney; Royal North Shore Hospital; Mater hospital
- Spouse: Greg O'Dea (m. 2000)
- Children: 3
- Awards: Australian of the Year 2024; UNSW Eureka Prize for Scientific Research 2026

Georgina Venetia Long AO is an Australian oncologist and translational researcher, who also works in drug therapy development. She was the joint recipient of the 2024 Australian of the Year Award, with Richard Scolyer.

== Early life and education ==
Georgina Venetia Long had five siblings and grew up in Sydney's inner west. She also lived in Europe and America as a child.

She completed high school at Santa Sabina College in 1988.

Long began studying a combined degree of science and law at the University of Sydney, but gave up law and graduated with a double major in pure maths and chemistry in 1993, before completing a PhD in organic chemistry, also at Sydney University, in 1996. She was a postdoctoral researcher at the Scripps Research Institute in California as a Fulbright Fellow, before returning to Australia to undertake her medical degree, graduating with an MBBS in 2001.

== Career ==
Long is a medical oncologist specialising in melanoma. She has led numerous clinical trials, focusing on targeted therapies and immuno-oncology in melanoma.

She is the chief investigator on research into the molecular biology of melanoma. In October 2020 she was ranked as 4th in the world, and first in Australia, of melanoma experts, in all fields and disciplines.

As of 2024 Long is director of the Melanoma Institute Australia. Together with pathologist Richard Scolyer, they were part of a team pioneering the use of immunotherapy treatment for melanoma, which Long then adapted for brain cancer when Scolyer was diagnosed with it in June 2023. He was the first brain cancer patient in the world to have pre-surgery combination immunotherapy. He died in June 2026.

== Awards and honours ==
In June 2024, Long was elected a Fellow of the Australian Academy of Science.

Long was the first woman and first Australian to be named president of the US-based Society for Melanoma Research.

- University Medal in Organic Chemistry, University of Sydney, 1993
- New South Wales Cancer Institute Awards Outstanding Cancer Research Fellow of the Year, 2013
- New South Wales Cancer Institute Awards The Wildfire Highly Cited Publication Award, 2014
- New South Wales Cancer Institute Awards Excellence in Translational Cancer Research Award, 2017
- New South Wales Cancer Institute Awards Outstanding Cancer Researcher of the Year, 2018
- Officer of the Order of Australia, in the 2020 Queen's Birthday Honours
- Ramaciotti Medal for Biomedical Research, 2021
- Medal for Outstanding Female Researcher, Australian Academy of Health and Medical Sciences, 2021
- New South Wales Cancer Institute Awards The Wildfire Highly Cited Publication Award, 2021
- Novartis Oncology Cancer Achievement Award, Medical Oncology Group of Australia, 2023
- Australian of the Year, 2024, with Richard Scolyer
- In December 2024, Georgina Long was included on the BBC's 100 Women list
- UNSW Eureka Prize for Scientific Research, Eureka Prizes, 2026

== Selected publications ==
- Long, Georgina V; Menzies, Alexander M; Nagrial, Adnan M; et al. (2011). "Prognostic and Clinicopathologic Associations of Oncogenic BRAF in Metastatic Melanoma". Journal of Clinical Oncology. 29 (10): 1239–1246. doi:10.1200/JCO.2010.32.4327. PMID 21343559.
- Robert, Caroline; Long, Georgina V; Brady, Benjamin; Dutriaux, Caroline; et al. (2015). "Nivolumab in previously untreated melanoma without BRAF mutation". New England Journal of Medicine. 372 (4): 320–330. doi:10.1056/NEJMoa1412082. hdl:11365/1090095. PMID 25399552.
- Robert, Caroline; Schachter, Jacob; Long, Georgina V; et al. (2015). "Pembrolizumab versus Ipilimumab in Advanced Melanoma". The New England Journal of Medicine. 372 (26): 2521–2532. doi:10.1056/NEJMoa1503093. PMID 25891173.
- Gershenwald, Jeffrey E; Scolyer, Richard A; Hess, Kenneth R; Sondak, Vernon K; Long, Georgina V; et al. (2017). "Melanoma staging: evidence-based changes in the American Joint Committee on Cancer eighth edition cancer staging manual". CA: A Cancer Journal for Clinicians. 67 (6): 472–492. doi:10.3322/caac.21409. PMC 5978683. PMID 29028110.
- Long, Georgina V; Atkinson, Victoria; Lo, Serigne; et al. (2018). "Combination nivolumab and ipilimumab or nivolumab alone in melanoma brain metastases: a multicentre randomised phase 2 study". The Lancet. 19 (5): 672–681. doi:10.1016/S1470-2045(18)30139-6. PMID 29602646.
- Long, Georgina V (2020). "Pan-cancer analysis of whole genomes". Nature. 578 (7793): 82–93. Bibcode:2020Natur.578...82I. doi:10.1038/s41586-020-1969-6. PMC 7025898. PMID 32025007.
- Carlino, Matteo S; Larkin, James; Long, Georgina V (2021). "Immune checkpoint inhibitors in melanoma". The Lancet. 398 (10304): 1002–1014. doi:10.1016/S0140-6736(21)01206-X. PMC 6094677. PMID 30190854.
