= Cancer Institute of New South Wales =

Statutory corporation for cancer research

Cancer Institute NSW
Statutory corporation overview
- Formed: July 2003
- Type: Government agency
- Jurisdiction: New South Wales
- Headquarters: 1 Reserve Road, St Leonards
- Employees: 360 (2022)
- Minister responsible: Ryan Park, Minister for Health
- Statutory corporation executive: Tracey O'Brien, Chief Executive Officer
- Parent Statutory corporation: NSW Health
- Key document: Cancer Institute (NSW) Act 2003
- Website: www.cancer.nsw.gov.au

The Cancer Institute NSW was established under the Cancer Institute (NSW) Act 2003 to lessen the impact of cancer in New South Wales, Australia.

It works with a variety of partners to implement programs that focus on cancer prevention, detection, treatment, and research.

== Other cancer services and resources ==
The Cancer Institute NSW also develops and manages a number of cancer-related information sources and services for the people of NSW. These include:

- The NSW Cancer Registry
- Canrefer: an online directory for general practitioners, patients and carers to find referral information for specialist multidisciplinary cancer teams in NSW
- eviQ: a portal for cancer treatments, providing evidence-based chemotherapy protocols, treatment information and tools at the point of care.
- iCanQuit: an online community-based smoking cessation support website
- BreastScreen NSW
- Cervical Screening NSW

== See also ==
- New South Wales Cancer Institute Awards
- Australian Melanoma Research Foundation
- Cancer
