= The Australian and New Zealand Association of Bellringers =

Bellringers association

- Abbreviation: ANZAB
- Predecessor: New South Wales Association of Change Ringers
- Formation: 1962
- Type: Membership organisation
- Website: anzab.org.au

The Australian and New Zealand Association of Bellringers, known as ANZAB, is the organisation responsible for the promotion of English-style full circle ringing – namely change ringing and method ringing in bell towers with a peal of bells – across Australia and New Zealand.

== History ==
The ANZAB was formed in 1962, through the renaming of the New South Wales Association of Change Ringers and the inclusion of ringers from other Australian states and New Zealand. Its purpose is, "To encourage and provide for the installation, restoration, augmentation and maintenance of rings of bells and to provide technical, financial and other assistance in respect thereof." The NSW association was formed in 1946, by Royal Navy sailors, visiting from the British Pacific Fleet, who brought their skills to the six existing towers around Sydney.

Before the formation of the association, a quarter peal had not been rung in NSW during the previous 40 years. As of 2014, ANZAB has around 500 members who ring at 64 bell towers.

== Functions ==
Aside from regular religious services, ringing is often conducted for special occasions such as state funerals, anniversaries, memorials and other locally or nationally significant events. For example, there was a national simultaneous ringing of bells in celebration of the centenary of the Federation of Australia on 1 January 2001. ANZAB is affiliated with the Central Council of Church Bell Ringers, founded in 1891 and based in the United Kingdom. While most bells are hung in churches, there is no expectation of religious affiliation among the ringers themselves.

ANZAB has branches in most Australian states, and these branches foster and encourage ringing at a local level through education and training. The branches organise regional ringing events, such as striking competitions, local advanced ringing sessions, and inter-tower visits and tours. ANZAB itself holds an annual ringing festival in conjunction with its Annual General Meeting. The location of the festival changes from year to year and is usually held in locations where two or more towers are easily accessible.

ANZAB publishes a quarterly journal, Ringing Towers, containing articles of general interest to bellringers, reports of social and ringing events in Australia and New Zealand, and all Quarter Peals and Peals rung for ANZAB or in ANZAB territory. The state branches also publish newsletters or websites related to their activities. In recognition of the lifesaving cardiopulmonary resuscitation (CPR) provided to Alan Coates who suffered a heart-attack while ringing in 2015, ANZAB now provides for first-aid and CPR training for two members in each tower.

ANZAB members also ring changes on handbells, a practice which was popularised in the United Kingdom during the Second World War when church bells were not allowed to be rung. As Carillon bells are not rung in full-circle style they are not affiliated with ANZAB. While historically change ringers have been somewhat hostile to the carillon, ANZAB has maintained a friendly relationship with carillonneurs who have performed at ANZAB events such as the 2016 Festival in Bathurst, due to the proximity between the Bathurst War Memorial Carillon and the change-ringing bell tower of All Saint's Cathedral.

== List of bellringing towers ==
Bells are usually tuned to a Diatonic major scale, with the tenor bell being the tonic (or key) note of the scale. Some towers have extra bells, indicated by the + sign, which are used to allow different subsets of the full number to be rung, still to a diatonic scale.

By convention, the weights of the tenor bells are shown in the imperial units: Hundredweights-quarters-pounds.

Ringers practising at St James' Church, Sydney

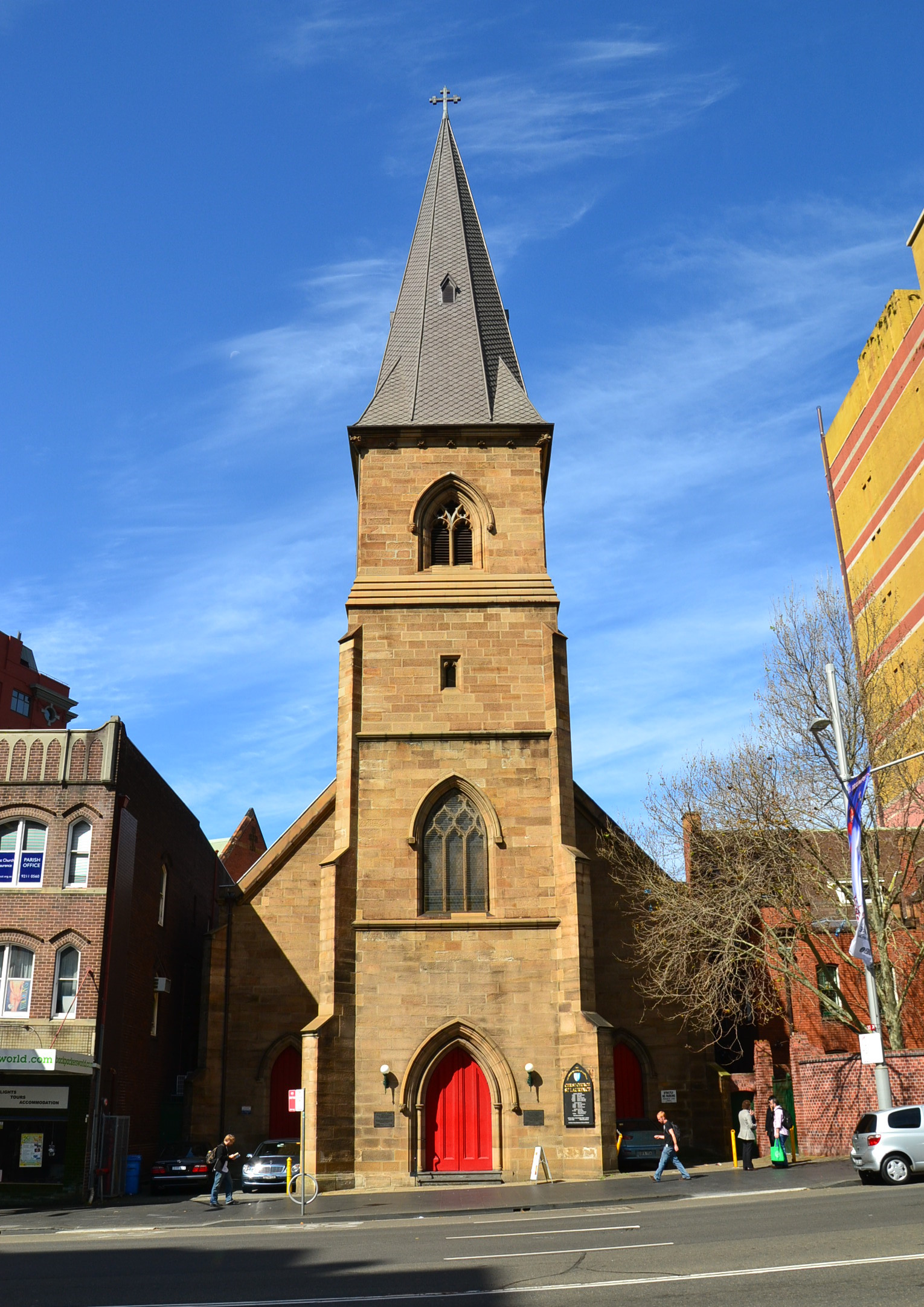
The tower of Christ Church St Laurence, "the oldest ringing peal in Australia".

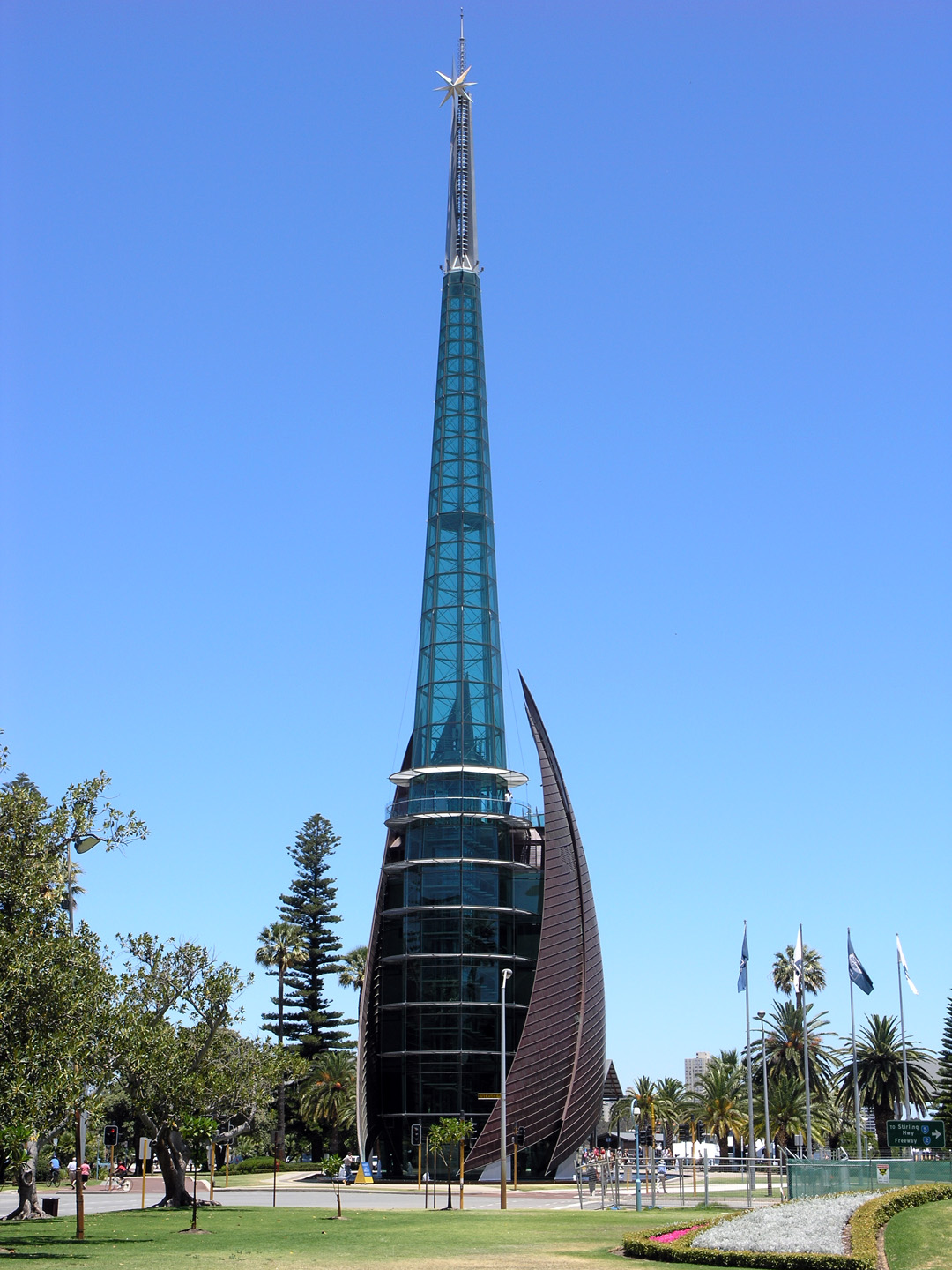
Swan Bells, Perth, the largest set of change ringing bells in Australia

Region	Church	Bells (tenor weight)	Reference
Australian Capital Territory	St Paul's Church, Manuka	8 (4-1-12)	Dove, ANZAB, homepage
New South Wales	St Matthews, Albury	8 (7-3-12)	Dove, ANZAB
New South Wales	St Peter's Cathedral, Armidale	8 (7-0-7)	Dove, ANZAB
New South Wales	All Saint's Cathedral, Bathurst	8 (11-3-14)	Dove, ANZAB, homepage
New South Wales	St Benedict's, Broadway	6 (14-0-25)	Dove, ANZAB, homepage
New South Wales	St Paul's, Burwood	8 (11-0-8)	Dove, ANZAB
New South Wales	Wesleyan Chapel, Castlereagh	6 (3-1-20)	Dove, ANZAB
New South Wales	St Mark's Church, Darling Point	8 (8-1-26)	Dove, ANZAB
New South Wales	St Saviour's Cathedral, Goulburn	12+1 (21-3-8)	Dove, ANZAB
New South Wales	St Alban's Cathedral, Griffith	6 (9-0-12)	Dove, ANZAB
New South Wales	Holy Family Catholic Church, Ingleburn	6 (2-3-0)	Dove, ANZAB
New South Wales	St Hilda's, Katoomba	6 (5-3-13)	Dove, ANZAB
New South Wales	Holy Family Catholic Church, Lindfield	5 (2-3-1)	Dove, ANZAB
New South Wales	St Andrew's, Lismore	8 (6-3-14)	Dove, ANZAB
New South Wales	Hoskins Memorial Church, Lithgow	8 (7-2-2)	Dove, ANZAB
New South Wales	St Paul's, Maitland	6 (14)	Dove, ANZAB
New South Wales	St James', Menagle	8 (7-1-27)	Dove, ANZAB
New South Wales	St Leonard's, Naremburn	6 (10-0-4)	Dove, ANZAB
New South Wales	Holy Trinity, Orange	8 (6-3-15)	Dove, ANZAB
New South Wales	All Saints, Parramatta	8 (10-1-5)	Dove, ANZAB
New South Wales	St Jude's, Randwick	8 (14-1-25)	Dove, ANZAB
New South Wales	Our Lady Help of Christians, Rosemeadow	8 (4-3-17)	Dove, ANZAB
New South Wales	All Saints, Singleton	8 (9-3-26)	Dove, ANZAB
New South Wales	Christ Church St Laurence, Sydney	10 (10-3-8)	Dove, ANZAB
New South Wales	St Andrew's Cathedral, Sydney	12+1 (29-0-4)	Dove, ANZAB
New South Wales	St James' Church, Sydney	8 (10-0-12)	Dove, ANZAB, homepage
New South Wales	St Mary's Cathedral, Sydney	12+2 (34-1-3)	Dove, ANZAB, homepage
New South Wales	St Philip's Church, Sydney	8 (18-2-21)	Dove, ANZAB, homepage
New South Wales	St James', Turramurra	8 (9-3-12)	Dove, ANZAB
New South Wales	St John's, Wagga Wagga	8 (6-2-0)	Dove, ANZAB
New South Wales	St Clement's, Yass	6 (6-1-13)	Dove, ANZAB
New Zealand, North Island	St Matthew-in-the-City, Auckland	8 (17-2-0)	Dove, ANZAB
New Zealand, North Island	St Andrew's, Cambridge	6 (12¼)	Dove, ANZAB
New Zealand, North Island	St Peter's Cathedral, Hamilton	8 (20-2-6)	Dove, ANZAB
New Zealand, North Island	Old St Paul's, Wellington	5 (3-3-25)	Dove, ANZAB, homepage
New Zealand, North Island	Wellington Cathedral of St Paul	12+2 (27-1-24)	Dove, ANZAB, homepage
New Zealand, South Island	First Church of Otago, Dunedin	8 (6-3-26)	Dove, ANZAB
New Zealand, South Island	St Paul's Anglican Church, Papanui	8 (6-0-26)	Dove, ANZAB
Northern Territory	St Mary's Star of the Sea Cathedral, Darwin	6 (5-2-1)	Dove, ANZAB
Queensland	St John's Cathedral, Brisbane	12 (16-1-17)	Dove, ANZAB, homepage
Queensland	Christ Church, Bundaberg	6 (14-2-24)	Dove, ANZAB
Queensland	St Paul's, Maryborough	8+1 (18-1-5)	Dove, ANZAB
Queensland	St Andrew's, South Brisbane	6 (7-2-21)	Dove, ANZAB, homepage
South Australia	St Francis Xavier's Cathedral, Adelaide	12+1 (28-2-1)	Dove, ANZAB
South Australia	St Peter's Cathedral, Adelaide	8 (41-1-0)	Dove, ANZAB, homepage
South Australia	Adelaide Town Hall	8 (13-2-13)	Dove, ANZAB
South Australia	St Cuthbert's, Prospect	8 (11-1-2)	Dove, ANZAB
South Australia	St Andrew's, Walkerville	6 (12-3-17)	Dove, ANZAB
Tasmania	Holy Trinity Church, North Hobart	8 (9-0-10)	Dove, ANZAB
Tasmania	St David's Cathedral, Hobart	10 (21-2-8)	Dove, ANZAB
Victoria	St Peter's, Ballarat	8 (11-2-26)	Dove, ANZAB
Victoria	Town Hall, Ballarat	8 (22-0-10)	Dove, ANZAB
Victoria	Christ Church, Beechworth	6 (4-0-25)	Dove, ANZAB
Victoria	St Paul's Cathedral, Bendigo	8 (14-2-4)	Dove, ANZAB
Victoria	St James', Brighton	6 (5-3-9)	Dove, ANZAB
Victoria	St Bartholomew, Burnley	6 (5-0-25)	Dove, ANZAB
Victoria	St Paul's, Geelong	8 (13-0-6)	Dove, ANZAB
Victoria	St James' Old Cathedral, Melbourne	8 (13-0-7)	Dove, ANZAB
Victoria	St Patrick's Cathedral, Melbourne	8 (12-1-10)	Dove, ANZAB, homepage
Victoria	St Paul's Cathedral, Melbourne	12+1 (29-1-12)	Dove, ANZAB
Victoria	Holy Trinity Cathedral, Wangaratta	8 (16-3-23)	Dove, ANZAB
Victoria	St Pius X, Heidelberg West	8 (5-3-27)	Dove, ANZAB
Western Australia	St Patrick's Cathedral, Bunbury	8 (7-3-1)	Dove, ANZAB, homepage
Western Australia	Christ Church, Claremont	6 (6-1-21)	Dove, ANZAB, homepage
Western Australia	Christ's Church, Mandurah	8 (7-2-8)	Dove, ANZAB, homepage
Western Australia	St Hilda's School Chapel, Mosman Park	8 (4-0-22)	Dove, ANZAB
Western Australia	St George's Cathedral, Perth	8 (11-0-18)	Dove, ANZAB, homepage
Western Australia	Swan Bells, Perth	16 (29-0-14)	Dove, ANZAB, homepage
Western Australia	Civic Centre, Rockingham	8 (3-0-19)	Dove, ANZAB
Western Australia	Holy Trinity, York	8 (4-2-16)	Dove, ANZAB

== See also ==
- Dove's Guide for Church Bell Ringers
- North American Guild of Change Ringers
- Alan Coates

== Bibliography ==
- Bleby, Elizabeth (2001). Their sound has gone forth: a history of change ringing in Australia and New Zealand to 2001. Millswood, South Australia: Australian and New Zealand Association of Bellringers. ISBN 0957873603.
- Bleby, Elizabeth (1989). We sing in a strange land: a history of change ringing in Australia and New Zealand to 1988. South Australia: Australian and New Zealand Association of Bellringers. ISBN 0731670078.
- Ringing Towers: The quarterly journal of the Australian and New Zealand Association of Bellringers, Libraries Australia ID 2682232
