= St Matthew-in-the-City =

Historic church in Auckland, New Zealand

- St Matthew's
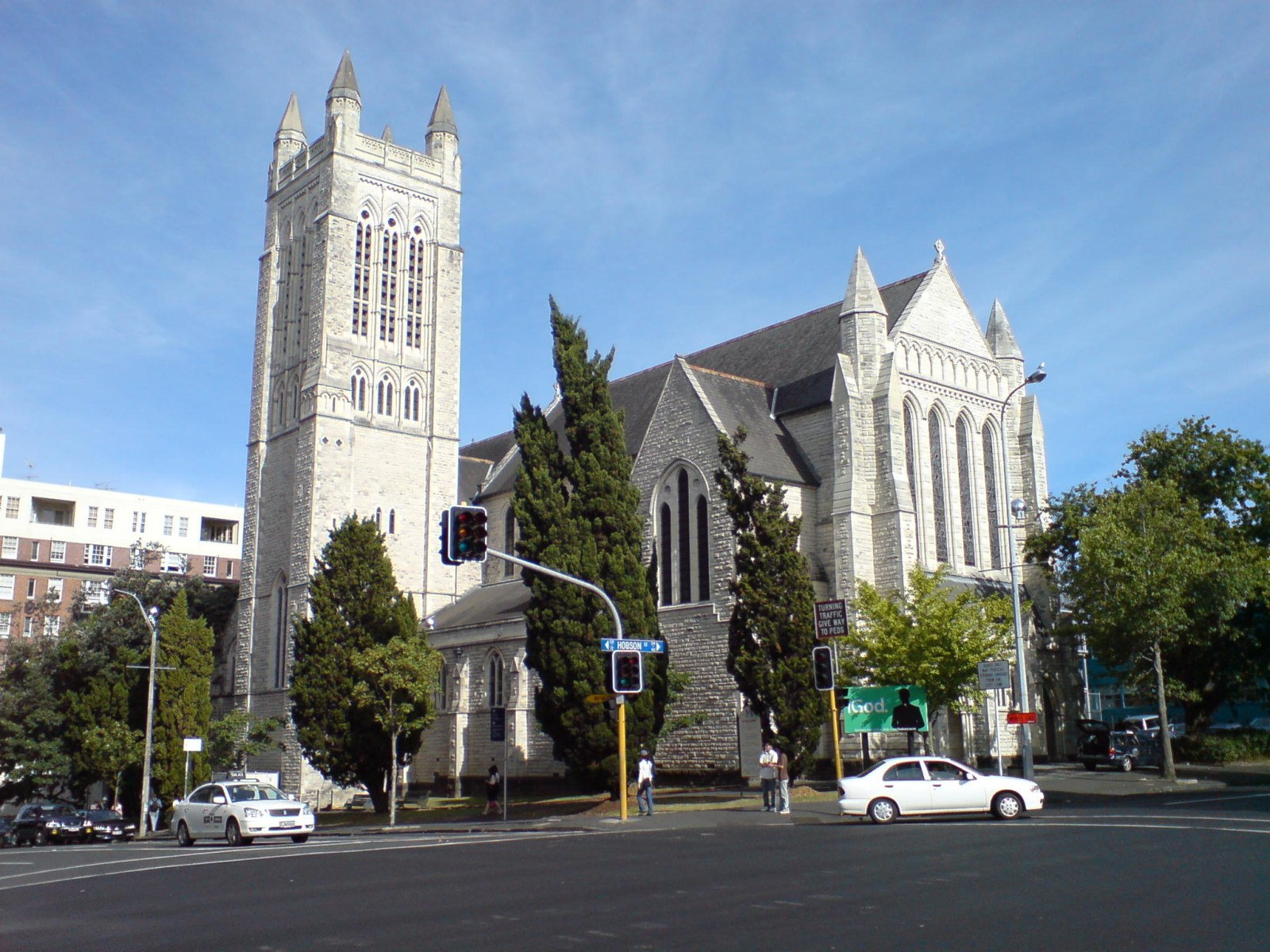
- St Matthew-in-the-City viewed from the northwest
- St Matthew-in-the-City
- 36°51′01″S 174°45′40″E
- Address: 132–134 Hobson Street, Auckland, North Island
- Country: New Zealand
- Denomination: Anglican
- Website: stmatthews.nz

History
- Status: Church
- Founded: 23 April 1902
- Founder: Governor Lord Ranfurly
- Dedication: Saint Matthew

Architecture
- Functional status: Active
- Architects: John Loughborough Pearson; Frank Loughborough Pearson
- Architectural type: Church
- Style: Gothic Revival
- Years built: 1902–1905

Specifications
- Capacity: 1,400 people
- Materials: Oamaru stone

Administration
- Province: Anglican Church in Aotearoa, New Zealand and Polynesia
- Diocese: Auckland
- Parish: St Matthew-in-the-City

Clergy
- Vicar: Richard Bonifant

Heritage New Zealand – Category 1
- Designated: 7 July 1987
- Reference no.: 99

St Matthew-in-the-City, sometimes called St Matthew's, is an historic Anglican church located at 132–134 Hobson Street in the central business district of Auckland, in the North Island of New Zealand. Part of the Anglican Church in Aotearoa, New Zealand and Polynesia and the Diocese of Auckland, the church building was completed in 1905 and is renowned for its Gothic Revival style.

The church was designed by English architect Frank L. Pearson.

== History ==
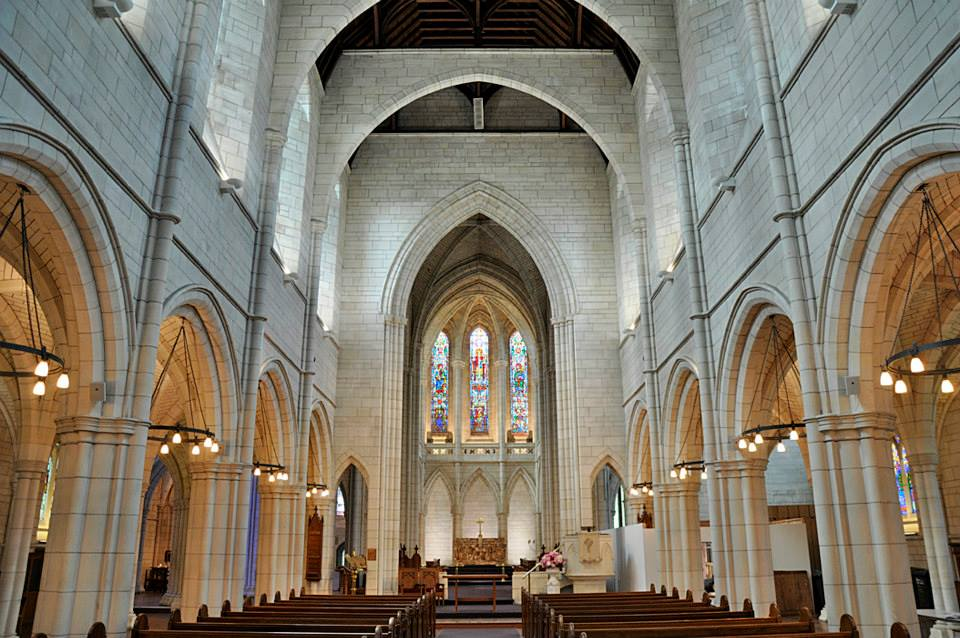
Interior

As Auckland expanded in the 1840s, residential and commercial buildings sprung up to the west of Queen Street. To serve the Anglicans amongst the growing population, George Selwyn, New Zealand's first Anglican bishop, acquired land from the Crown in 1843 at the corner of Hobson and Wellesley Street. Anglican worship began in 1853 in the timber school building from which Selwyn first conducted services.

In 1855 Selwyn appointed the designer of Old St Paul's, Wellington, the Reverend Frederick Thatcher, as vicar of the new parish of St Matthew's. On 13 July, 30 people met in the school room to constitute the new parish. A wooden Gothic Revival church was built in 1863.

Eastern Auckland remained the establishment part of the city. Meanwhile, St Matthew's in the west became the church of merchants and shopkeepers. Its finances reflected their support and acumen. From a shaky start – Thatcher's annual stipend was supplemented by 88 pounds from his military and prison chaplaincies – the parish became self-supporting within 10 years. By 1868 its income was 1000 pounds a year, then the largest in the diocese.

As Auckland grew to the west, so new parishes were established and St Matthew's built a mission chapel, St Thomas', in Freemans Bay in 1876.

In 1896 the parish decided it was time to build the stone church. John Loughborough Pearson, designer of both Truro Cathedral in Cornwall and St John's Cathedral in Brisbane, Australia was engaged, but before he could complete the plans he died in December 1897. His son, Frank Loughborough Pearson, completed his work and the cornerstone was laid on 23 April 1902 by Governor Lord Ranfurly.

The building includes a 1300-year-old stone from the ruins of St Augustine's Abbey, England, and is listed as a Category I Historic Place by Heritage New Zealand. It has a peal of eight bells, most of which were made in 1862, rung in the change ringing style by members of The Australian and New Zealand Association of Bellringers.

== Ministry ==
As central Auckland became increasingly commercial the population in the parish declined. St Matthew's took on more of a role as church to the commercial and civic life of the city, a role it continues today. The church's size, location, style and musical tradition have made it a natural place for civic services to be held. Typical were a memorial service for Prime Minister Richard Seddon and for the silver jubilee of King George V in 1935. In two world wars, St Matthew's held services to farewell troops and to offer thanksgiving for their return. In recent years, St Matthew's has held civic memorial services for the victims of AIDS and the Air New Zealand Flight 901 disaster on Mount Erebus.

Because its location frequently brought it into contact with the poor, even in its early days, St Matthew's developed a strong social justice ministry. A leader in the protests against apartheid in South Africa during the 1981 Springbok Tour and sponsorship in 1974 of the Auckland Community Church, a congregation ministering to gays and lesbians established it as a strong voice for human rights. In 1996 Nelson Mandela recognised that voice by coming to St Matthew's to thank New Zealand for its important role in ending apartheid.

The church has a pro-gay marriage stance and, after New Zealand legalised gay marriage, put out the call for gay couples to be married there.

Glynn Cardy, a former archdeacon and last vicar, resigned on 5 October 2013, and is now the minister of a presbyterian Church. Helen Jacobi was inducted, the first woman vicar of St Matthew's.

In December 2009 a billboard put up by the church showing Mary and Joseph in bed together drew global media attention as well as criticism from other churches.

== Gallery ==
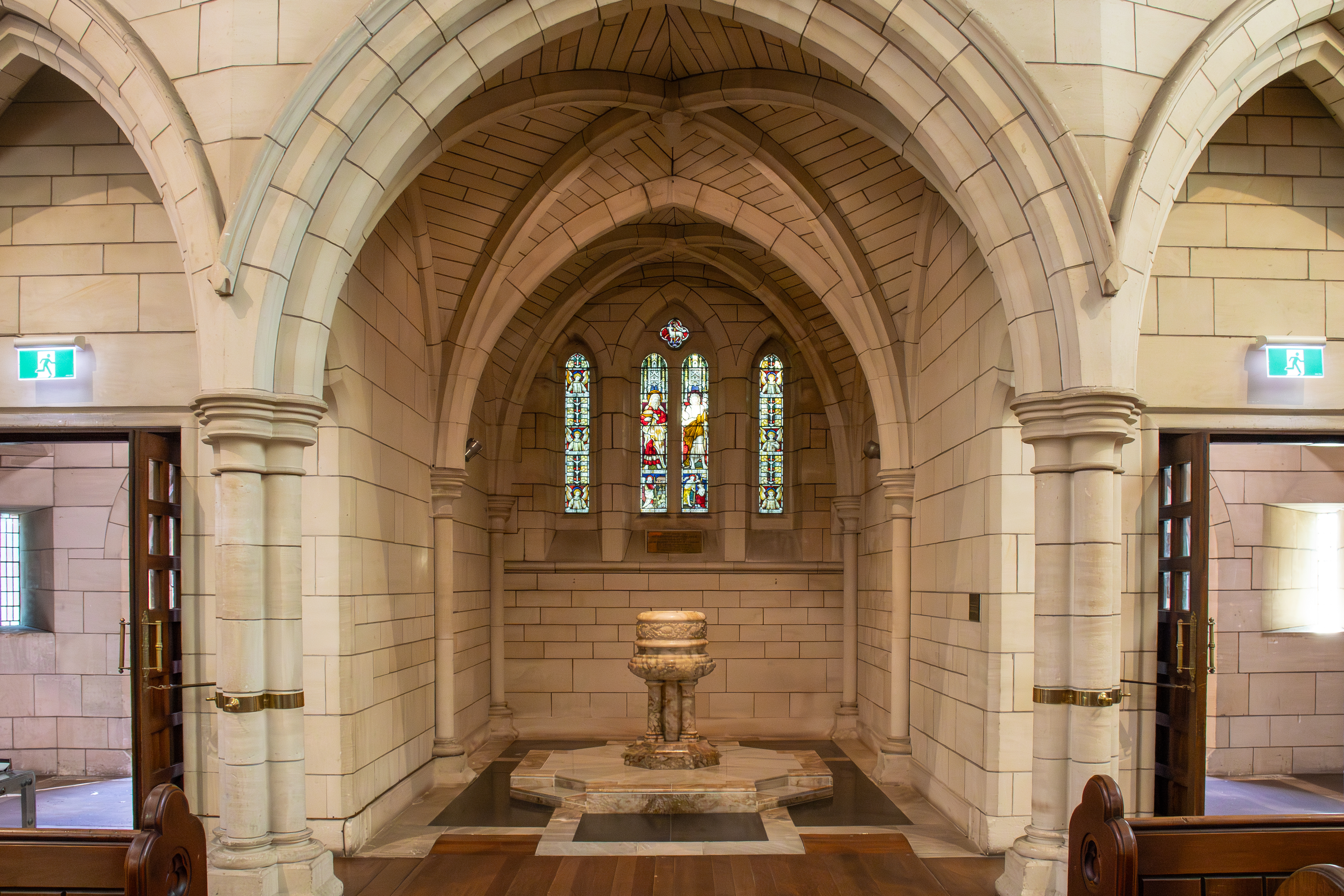
Baptistery

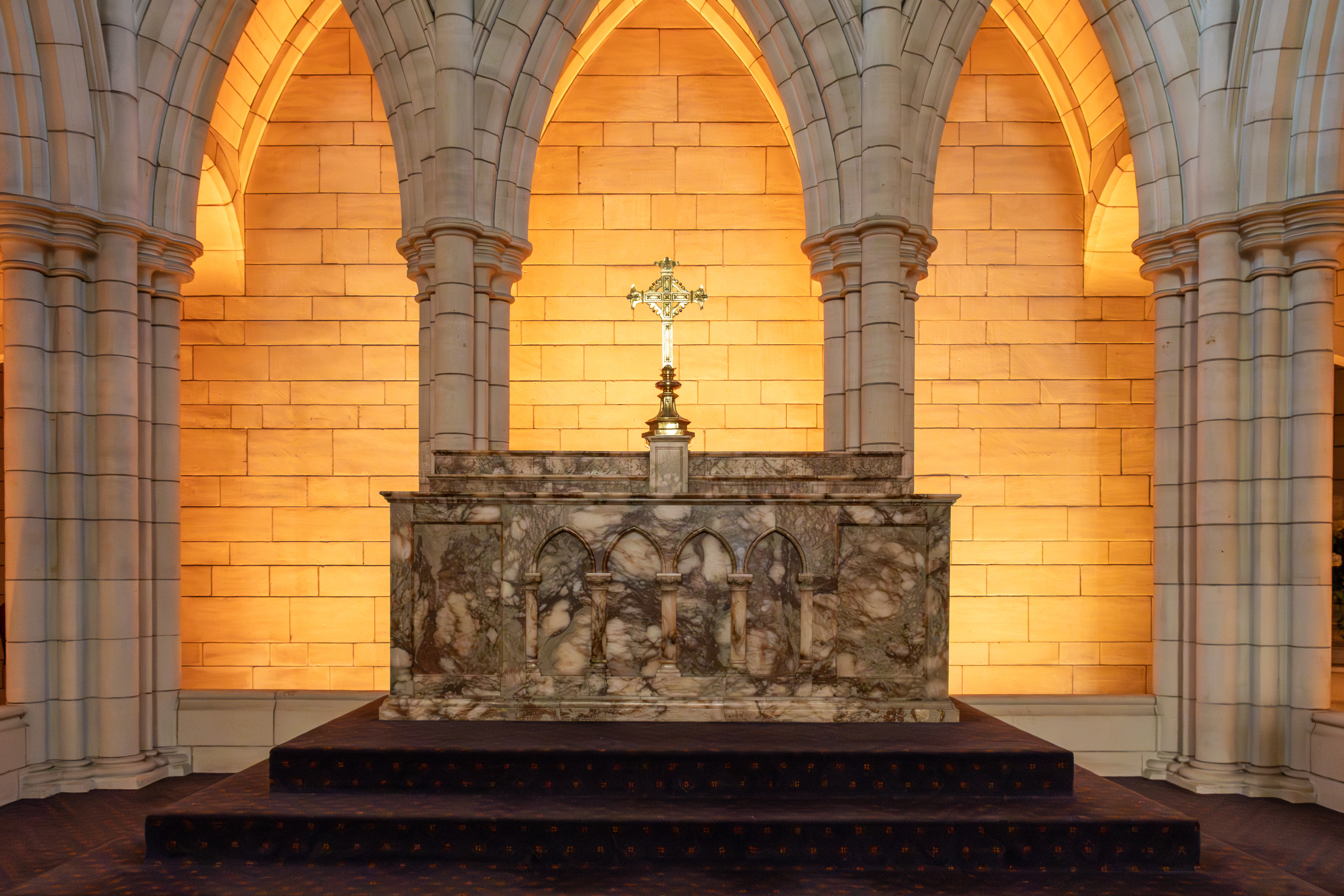
Altar

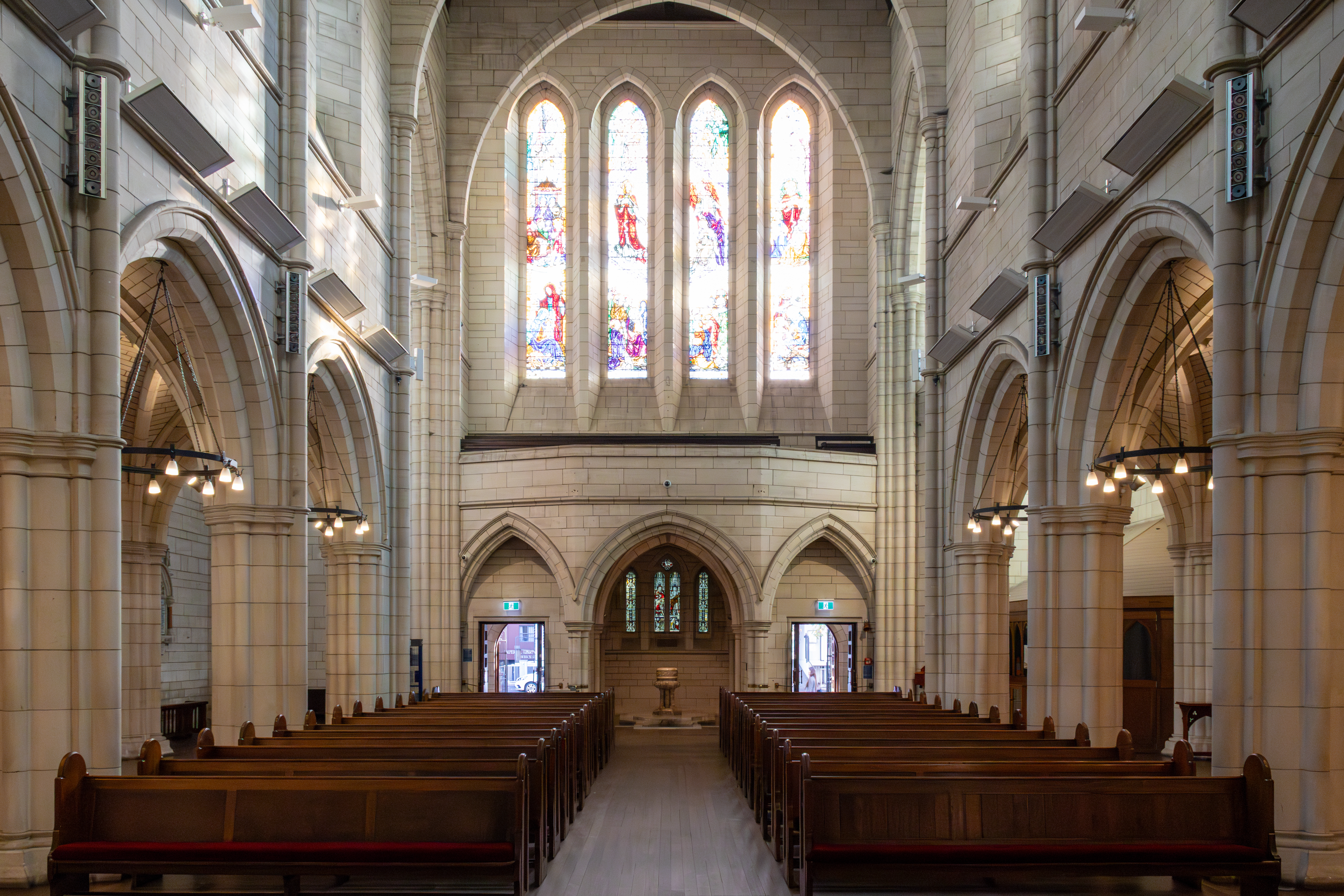
Nave, looking towards entry

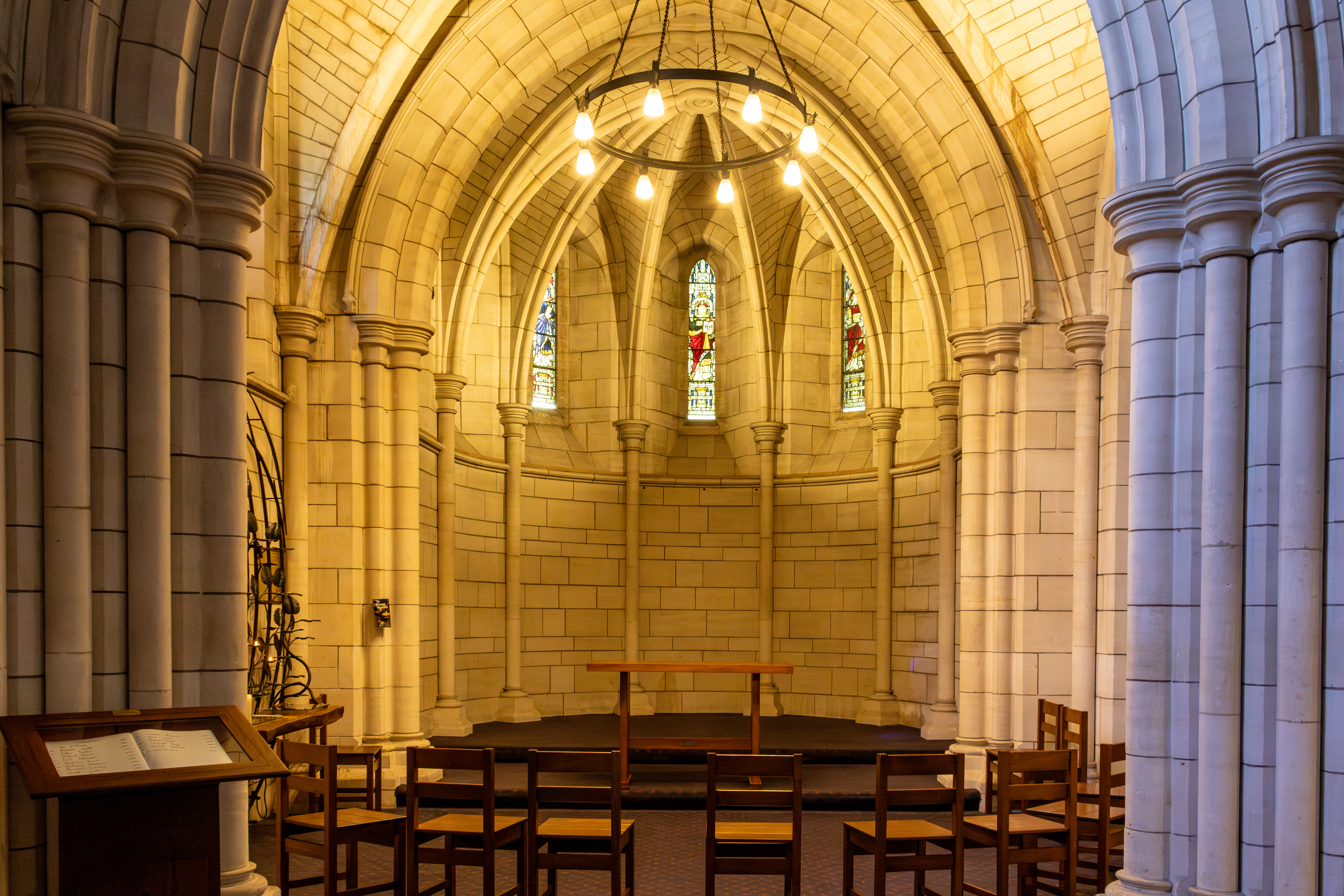
The Peace Chapel

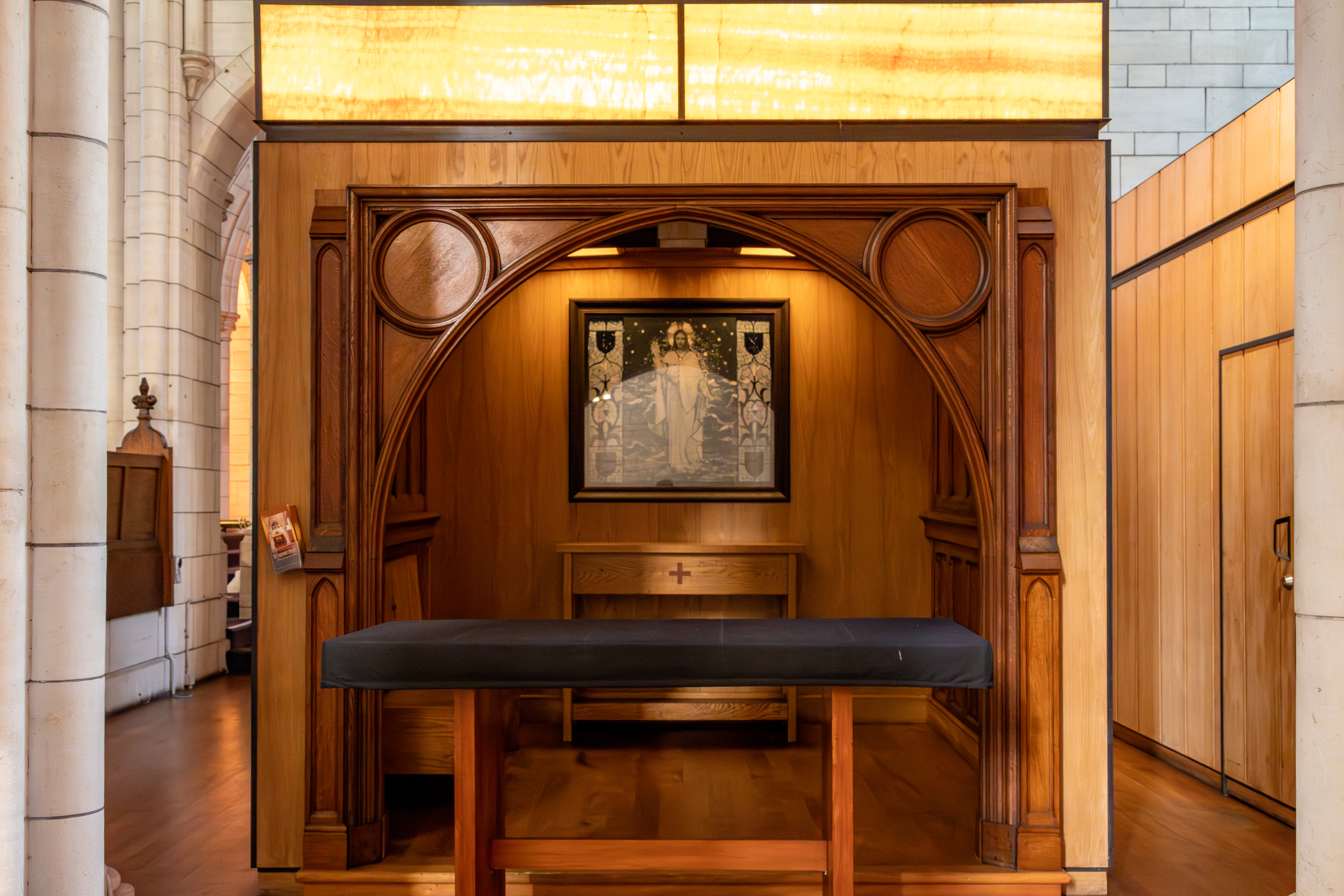
St Thomas's Chapel

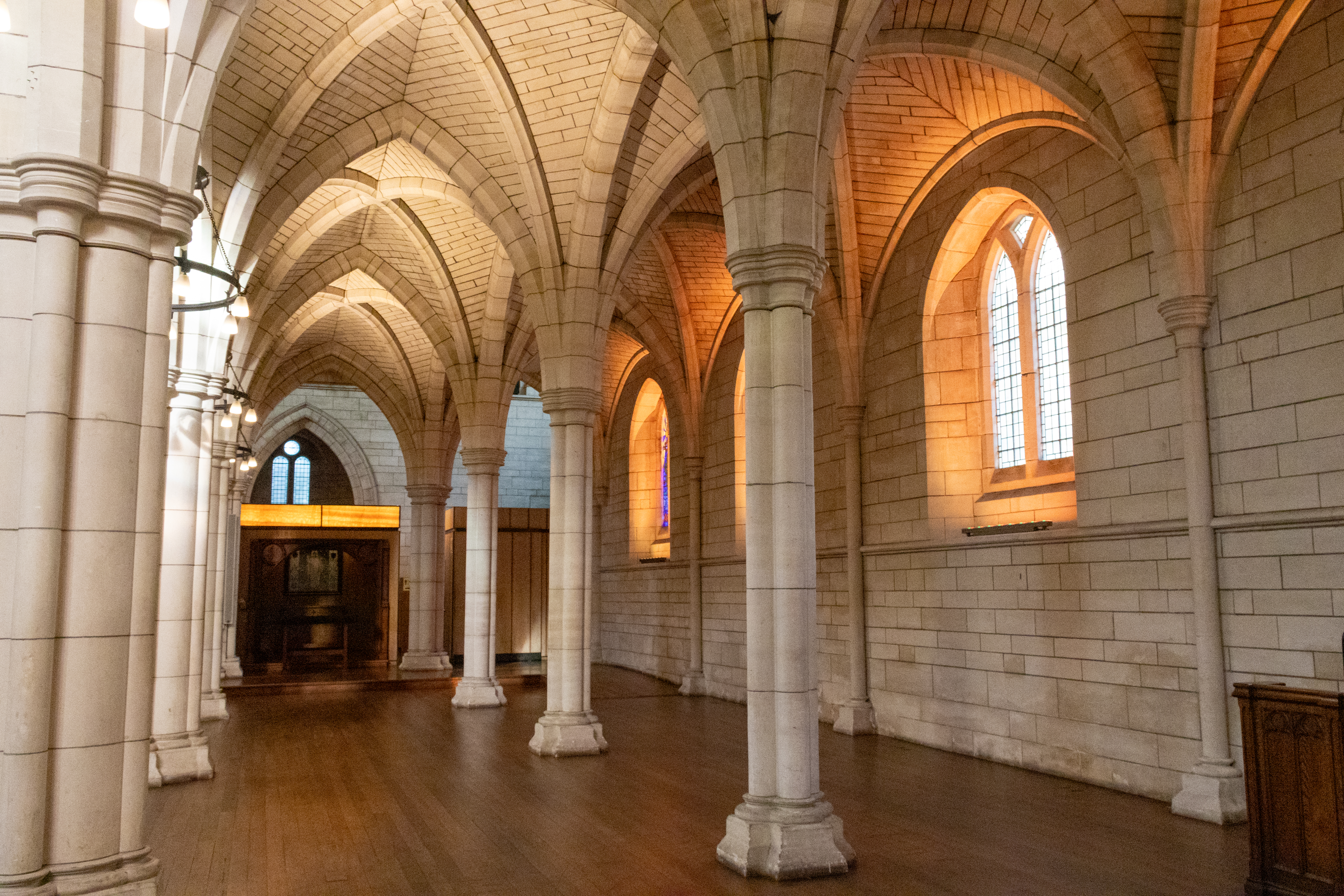
Epistle-side aisle

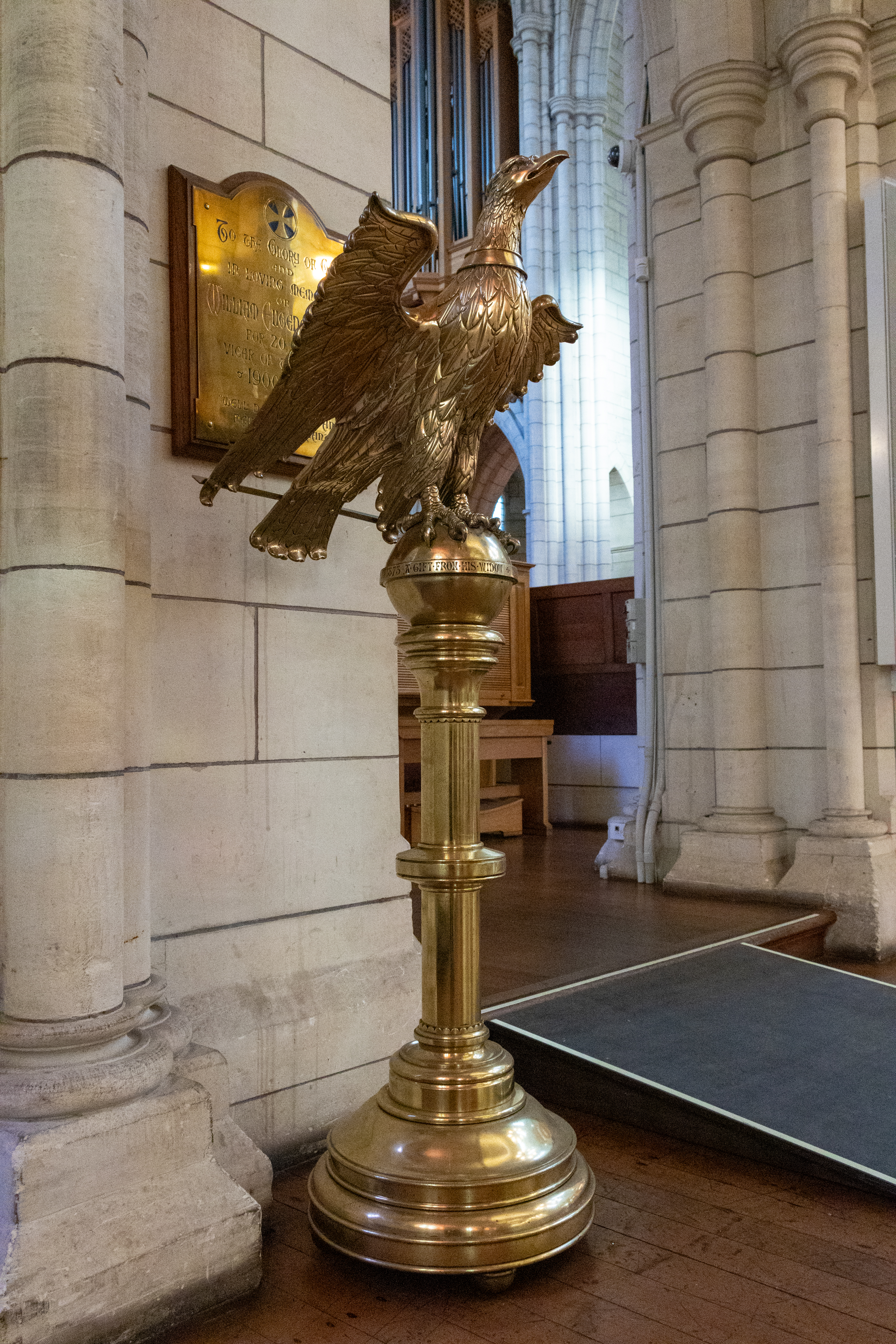
Eagle lectern

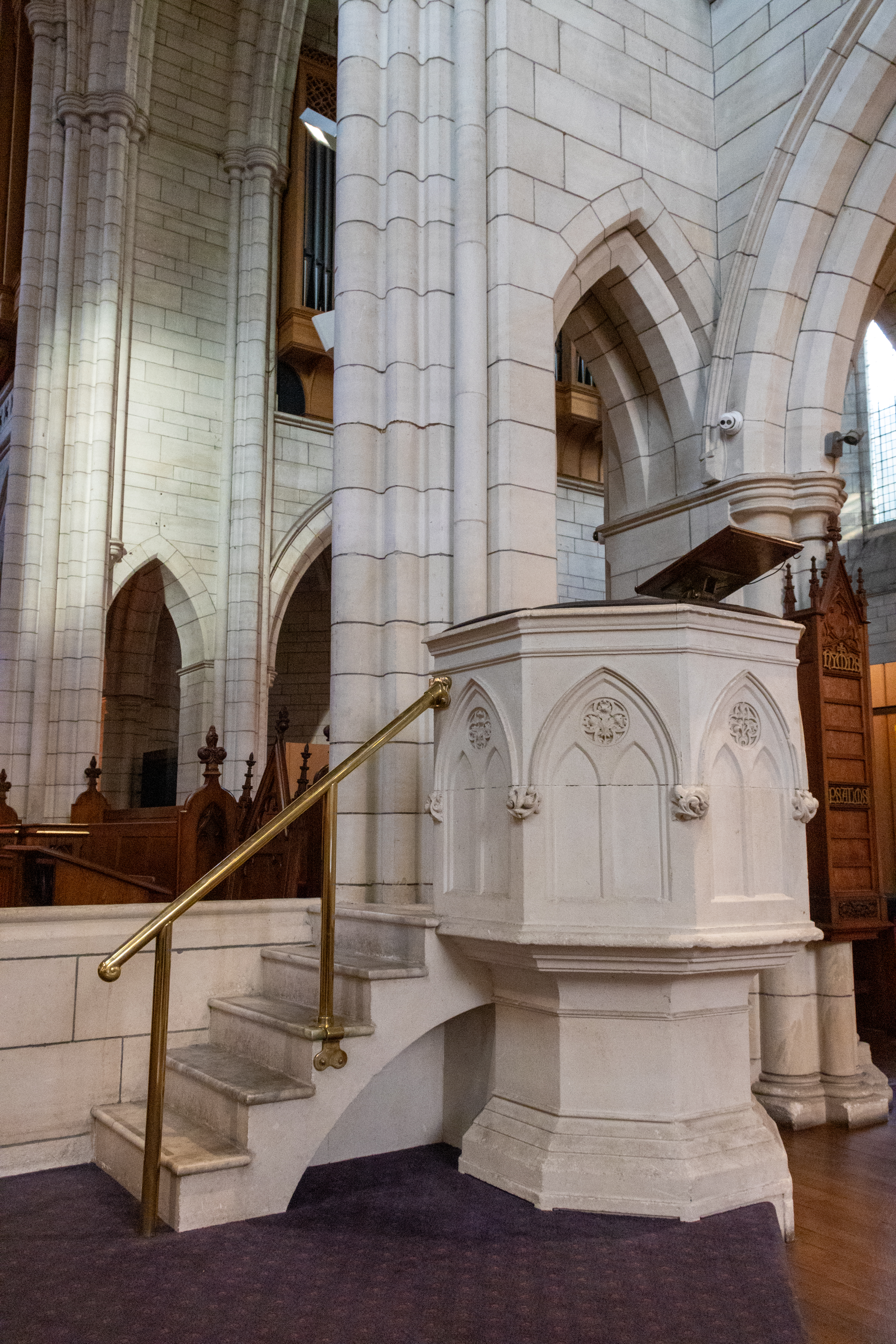
Pulpit

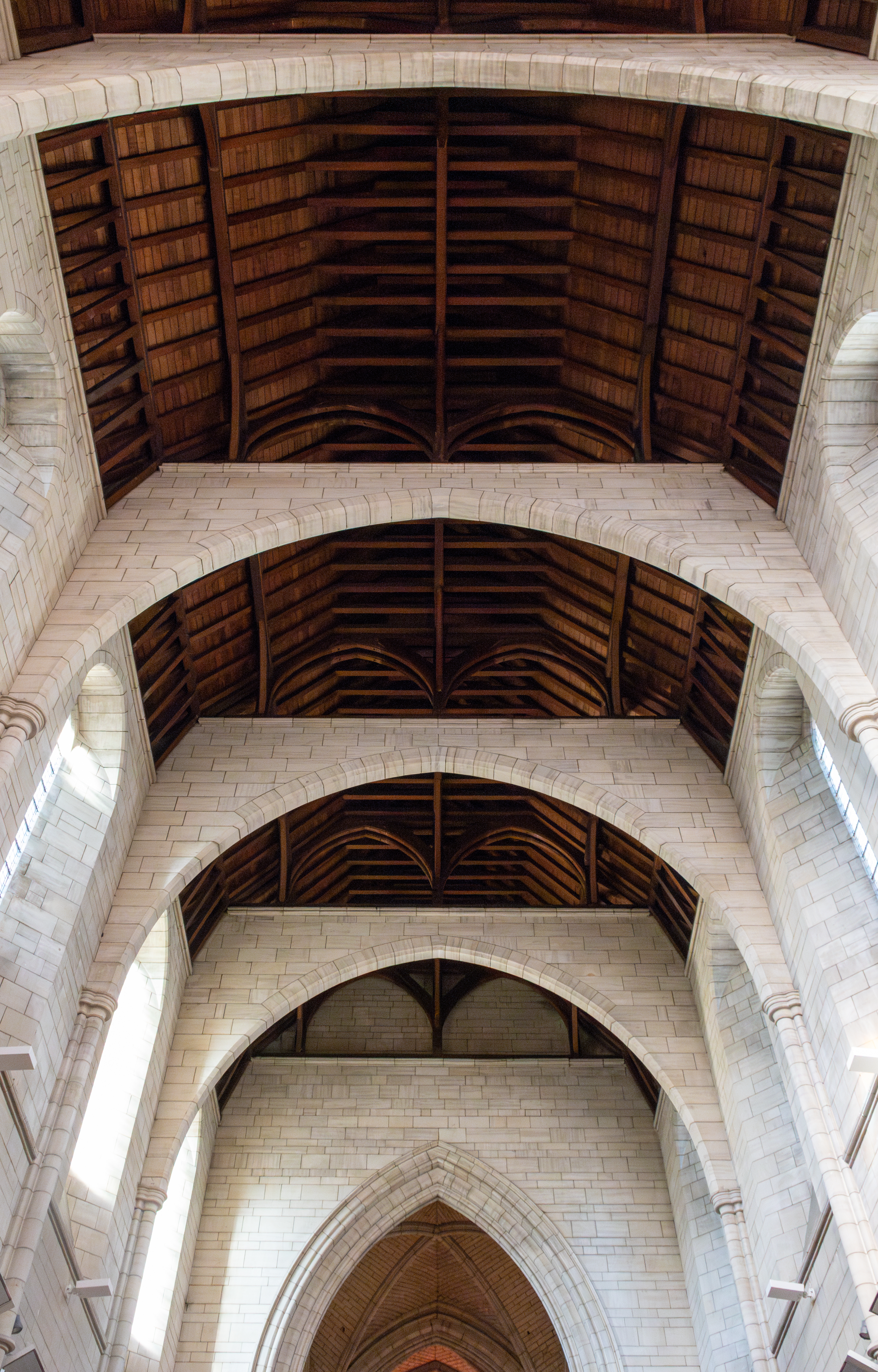
The ceiling

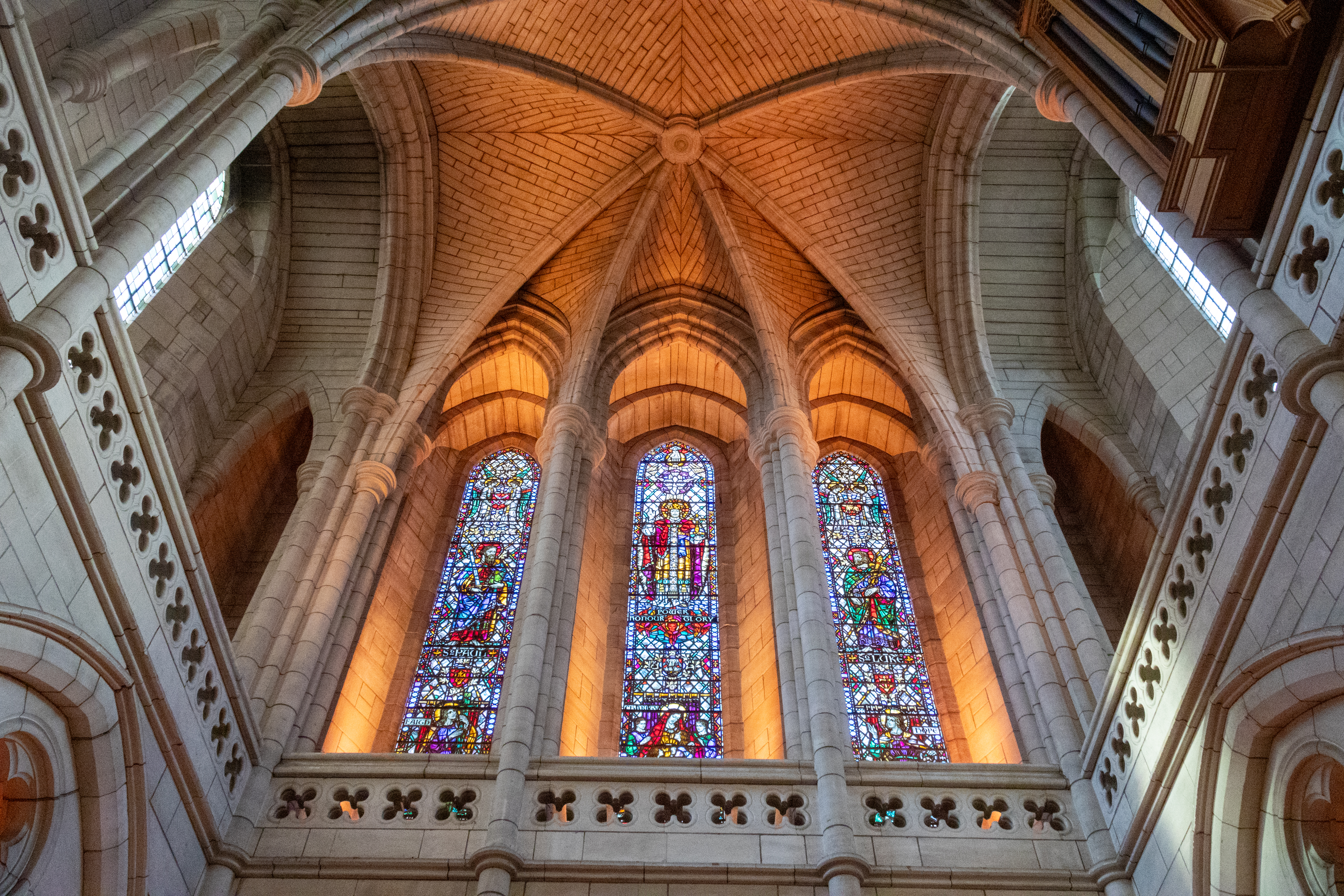
The chancel ceiling

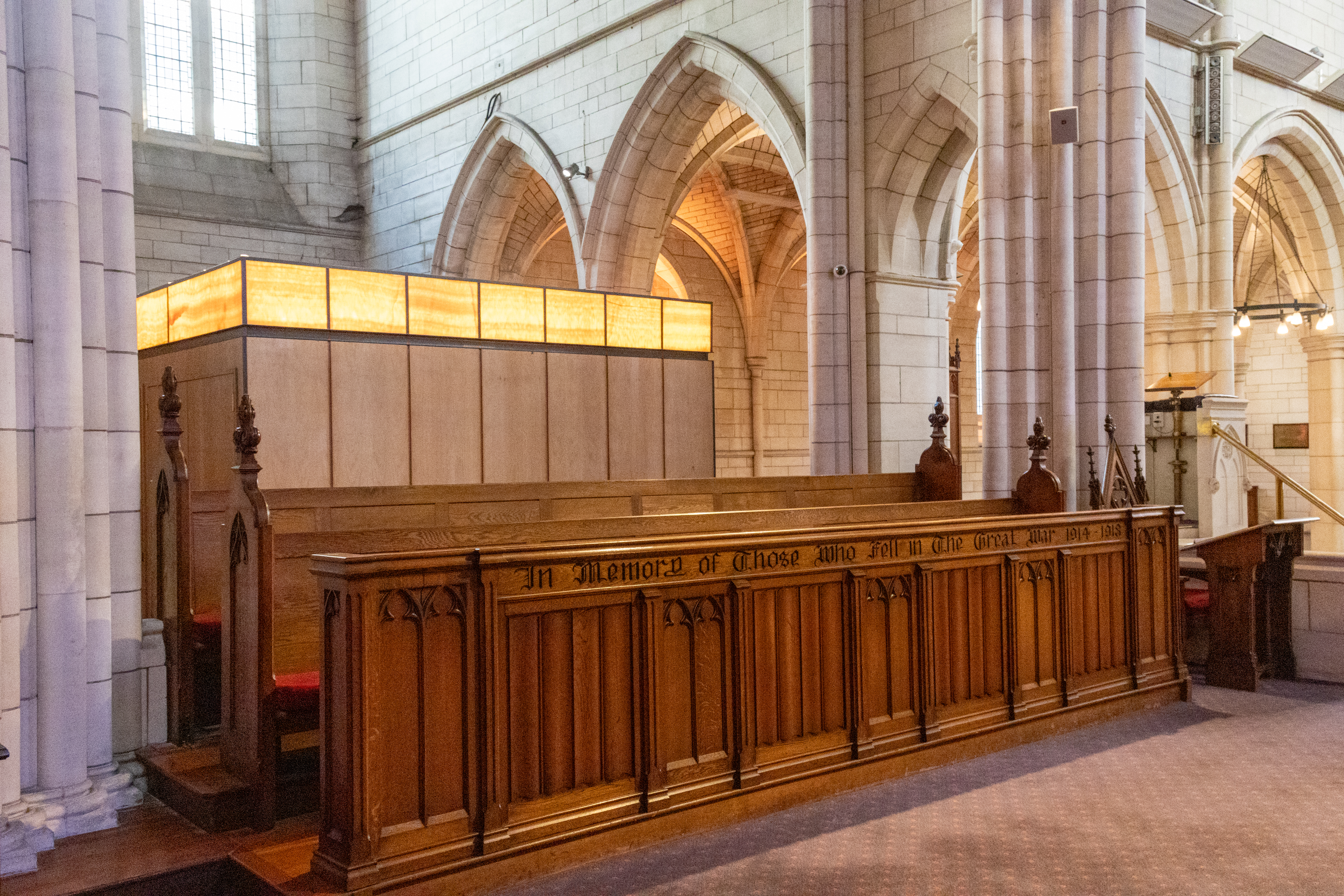
Choir stalls

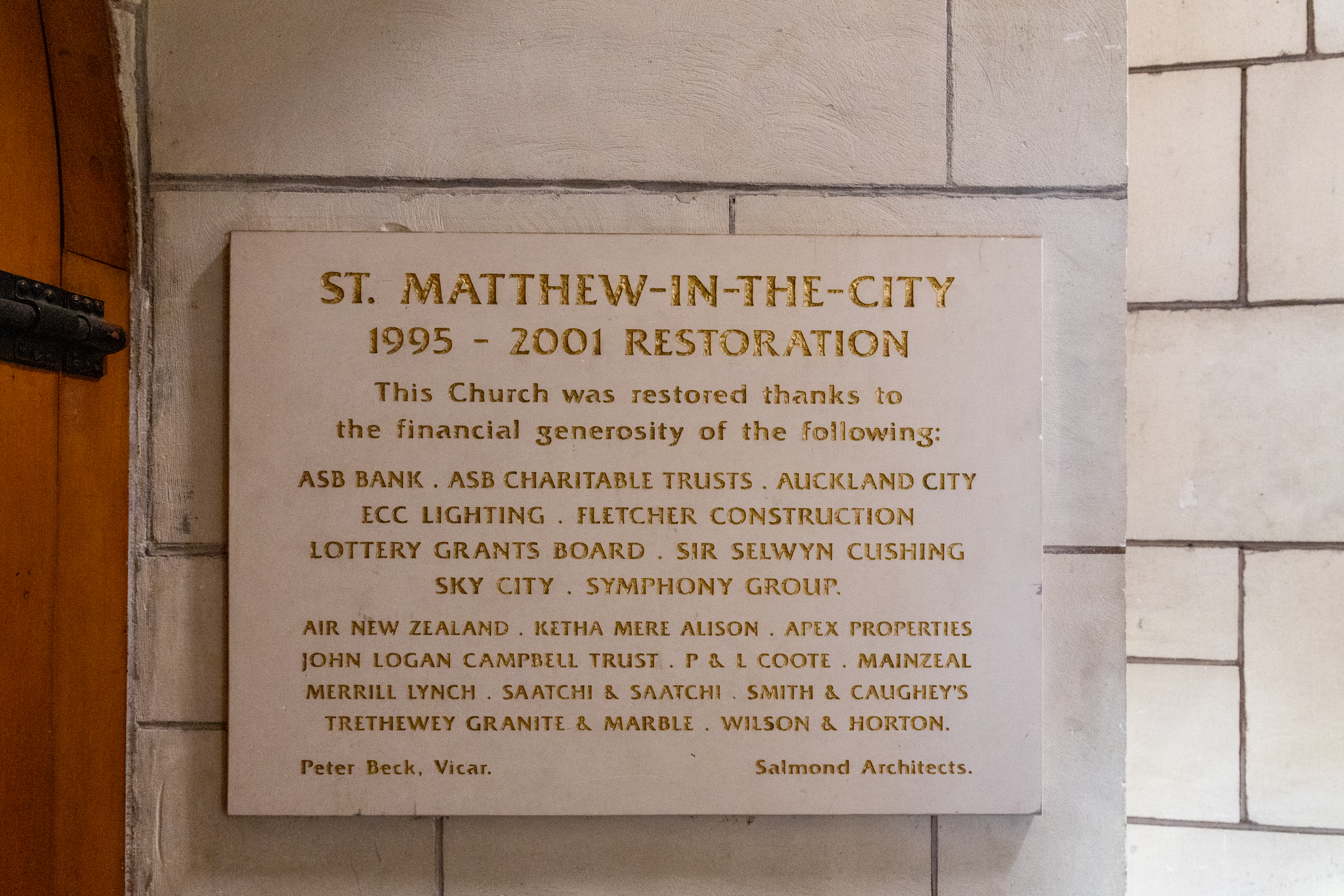
Restoration plaque
