= New South Wales Cancer Institute Awards =

Award given to cancer researchers

The Cancer Institute NSW Premier's Awards for Outstanding Cancer Research is an awards ceremony for the cancer research sector in New South Wales. The event honours the achievements of individuals and teams that work across the cancer research sector to lessen the impact of cancer for the people of the state.

These awards are an opportunity to honour the state's cancer researchers whose work has led to new discoveries about cancer diagnoses, treatments and survival. Their achievements reflect that improving cancer outcomes is a series of incremental steps.

As the New South Wales Government's cancer control agency, the Cancer Institute NSW supports, facilitates and collaborates with all in the cancer control sector to translate new discoveries in to meaningful knowledge to improve the health system of NSW. This new information helps to drive rapid improvement in cancer prevention, treatment, care and ultimately, survival outcomes.

== Past award nights ==
2011 Cancer Research Awards

2012 Cancer Research Awards

2013 Cancer Research Awards

2014 Cancer Research Awards

2015 Cancer Research Awards

=== 2016 awards ===
- Outstanding Cancer Researcher of the Year – Professor John Simes
- The Professor Rob Sutherland AO Make a Difference Award – Professor Minoti Apte OAM
- Outstanding Cancer Research Fellow – Dr Zaklina Kovacevic
- The 'Rising Star' PhD Student Award – Dr Andrew Chen
- Big Data, Big Impact – Associate Professor Daniel Catchpoole and Team, Sydney Children's Hospital Network
- Excellence in Translation Cancer Research – Dr Natalie Taylor and Team, Australian Institute of Health Innovation Behaviour Change Research Stream
- The 'Wildfire' Highly Cited Publication Award – Dr James Wilmott
- Innovation in Cancer Clinical Trials – Central Coast Local Health District

=== 2017 awards ===
- Outstanding Cancer Researcher of the Year – Professor Richard Kefford AM
- The Professor Rob Sutherland AO Make a Difference Award – Professor David Goldstein
- Outstanding Cancer Research Fellow – Dr Marina Pajic
- The 'Rising Star' PhD Student Award – Rebecca Poulos
- Big Data, Big Impact – no award
- Excellence in Translational Cancer Research – Professor Richard Scolyer and Professor Georgina Long, Melanoma Institute Australia
- The 'Wildfire' Highly Cited Publication Award – Professor Helen Rizos, Melanoma Translational Research Team
- Outstanding Cancer Clinical Trials Unit Award – Central West Cancer Care Centre

== See also ==
- Cancer Institute NSW
- List of medicine awards
