= Richard Scolyer =

Australian pathologist (1966–2026)

Richard Scolyer AO
- Born: Richard Anthony Scolyer; 16 December 1966; Launceston, Tasmania, Australia
- Died: 7 June 2026 (aged 59); Sydney, New South Wales, Australia
- Education: University of Tasmania; University of Sydney
- Occupations: Pathologist and translational researcher
- Organization: Melanoma Institute Australia
- Spouse: Katie Nicoll
- Children: 3

Richard Anthony Scolyer (16 December 1966 – 7 June 2026) was an Australian pathologist. He was a senior staff specialist in tissue pathology and diagnostic oncology at Royal Prince Alfred Hospital, and Conjoint Professor, Sydney Medical School, Faculty of Medicine and Health, The University of Sydney. He and Professor Georgina Long were honoured as 2024 Australians of the Year.

== Career ==
Scolyer provided a clinical consultation service for the diagnosis of difficult pigmented lesions and received more than 2,000 cases for opinion from Australasia and beyond annually. He integrated his clinical practice with co-leading a melanoma translational research laboratory.

In February 2019, he was ranked the world's 10th leading publisher on the topic of melanoma and the world's leading publisher in melanoma pathology. Scolyer had co-authored more than 700 publications and book-chapters on the subject until his death in 2026, and was an editor of the fourth edition of the WHO classification of tumours of the central nervous system.

== Cancer diagnosis and treatment ==
In June 2023, Scolyer was diagnosed with a grade 4 glioblastoma IDH wild-type brain tumour. With treatment for glioblastoma mostly unchanged for the last 20 years, Georgina Long worked to develop a world-first treatment for Scolyer's brain tumour based on breakthroughs in melanoma research. Scolyer underwent experimental combination immunotherapy before and after surgical excision of the tumour, delaying his surgery to do so. Scolyer was also administered a cancer vaccine personalised to the tumour genetic markers, in order to help the immunotherapy detect the cancer cells. His treatment was documented in the journal Nature Medicine, paving the way for future clinical trials. While medical oncologists have applied these techniques successfully to melanoma, this treatment is non-standard for brain cancer due to concerns about toxicity, whether drugs will reach the brain, and speed of tumour development.

In February 2024, eight months after surgery, Scolyer's cancer had not returned. This was an encouraging result with potentially broader implications due to the pioneering approach taken, with the normal prognosis for this glioblastoma being six to nine months, though oncologists warned that it was too early to judge the effectiveness of the treatment, compared to standard protocols. On 10 March 2025, Scolyer announced the cancer had returned, and he was given a prognosis of three months. In January 2026, Scolyer expressed surprise that he had lived for two and a half years since his diagnosis, much longer than the average 12 months.

== Personal life and death ==
Richard Anthony Scolyer was born on 16 December 1966 in Launceston, Tasmania. After attending Riverside High School and Launceston Community College, he completed his medical training at the University of Tasmania, undertook pathology training in Canberra and Sydney, and subsequently became a clinical professor at the University of Sydney.

Scolyer was married to a fellow pathologist, Katie Nicoll; they had three children.

Scolyer died from brain cancer on 7 June 2026, at the age of 59, three years after his first diagnosis. A state funeral was held in memory of Scolyer at the Sydney Opera House on 13 July.

== Awards and recognition ==
As of 2020 Scolyer had received ten New South Wales Premier's Awards for Outstanding Cancer Research in 2009, 2012, 2013, 2014, 2016, 2017, 2018 and 2020.

He was appointed an Officer of the Order of Australia for "distinguished service to medicine, particularly in the field of melanoma and skin cancer, and to national and international professional organisations" in the 2021 Queen's Birthday Honours.

Scolyer was named 2024 Australian of the Year alongside Georgina Long by the National Australia Day Council, a not-for-profit Australian Government-owned social enterprise.

He won Social Impact Book of the Year at the 2025 Australian Book Industry Awards for his book Brainstorm.
