= Breast Cancer Research and Treatment =

- Discipline: Medicine
- Language: English
- Edited by: Aditya Bardia

Publication details
- History: 1981–present
- Publisher: Springer Netherlands (Netherlands)
- Impact factor: 4.872 (2020)

Standard abbreviations
- ISO 4: Breast Cancer Res. Treat.

Indexing
- ISSN: 0167-6806

Links
- Journal homepage

Breast Cancer Research and Treatment is a scientific journal focused on the treatment of and investigations in breast cancer. It is targeted towards a wide audience of clinical researchers, epidemiologists, immunologists, or cell biologists interested in breast cancer.

The types of articles in this journal include original research, invited reviews, discussions on controversial issues, book reviews, meeting reports, letters to the editors, and editorials. Manuscripts are peer-reviewed by an international and multidisciplinary panel of advisory editors. According to the Journal Citation Reports, the journal has a 2020 impact factor of 4.872.
