= Australian Melanoma Research Foundation =

Australian research charity

- Type: Charity
- Purpose: Research, improving survival rates for cancer sufferers, preventive measures
- Headquarters: Adelaide, Australia
- Region served: Australia
- Website: www.melanomaresearch.com.au

The Australian Melanoma Research Foundation participates in various activities to raise funds and raise awareness of melanoma.
