= Great Seal of Australia =

National seal of Australia

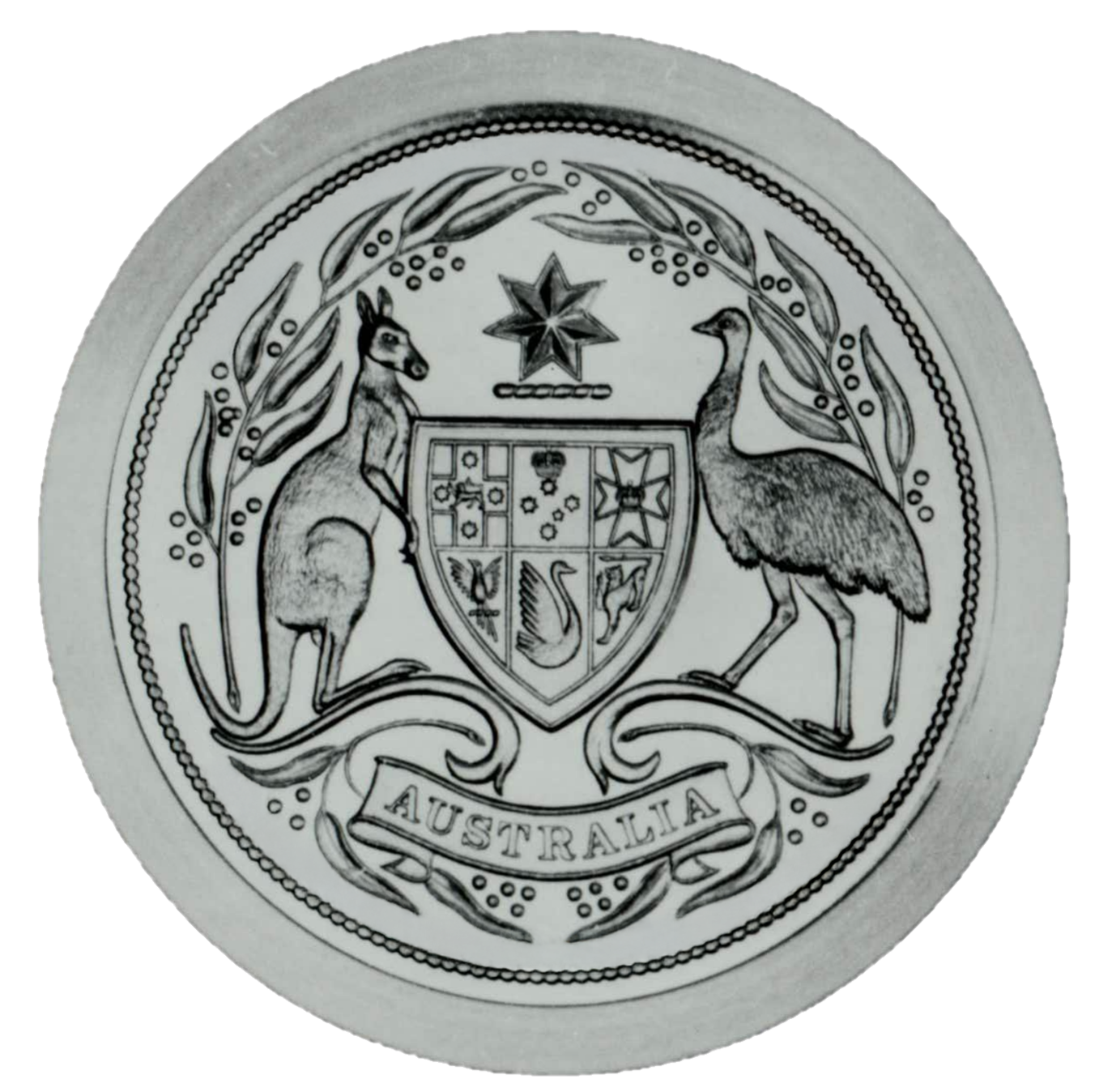
Great Seal of Australia

The Great Seal of Australia (also known as the Great Seal of the Commonwealth) is used on some important documents (such as officer commissions, judicial appointments and letters-patent for royal commissions) to demonstrate the approval of the Commonwealth. As the imprint of the seal could not be easily reproduced by government printers, its presence is shown by the initials "L.S" for locus sigilli ('the place of the seal') on copies of sealed documents.

The current design features the coat of arms of Australia. It was authorised by King Charles III on 21 October 2024 during his first visit to Australia as monarch.

== History ==
The Great Seal of Australia is provided for by letters patent signed by Queen Victoria in 1900. The first great seal was chosen in a competition in 1901 with entries by Bulletin cartoonist DH Souter and painter Blamire Young chosen for the design. Some other changes were made and the seal arrived in Australia after being produced by the Royal Mint in 1904. Before it arrived, the personal seal of the governor-general was used. The first seal depicts on one side the arms of Great Britain surrounded by the arms of the States of Australia. The other side depicts a woman on a charger, carrying a shield with a Union Jack design and in the hand a palm. Behind her is an image of the sun and beneath is the words Advance Australia. This design also features on the mace of the House of Representatives.

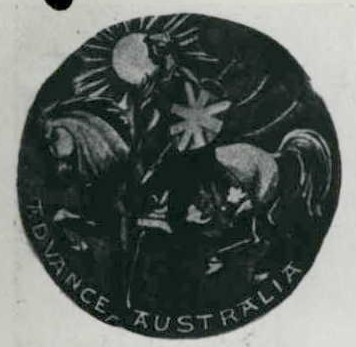
Obverse of the winner of the Great Seal competition, designed by David Henry Souter

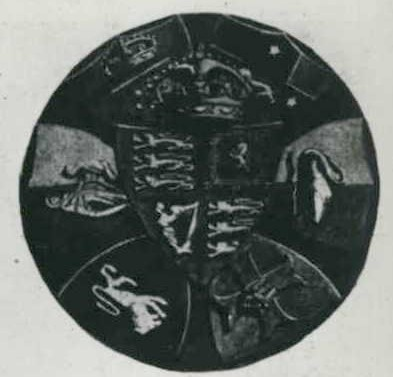
Reverse of the winner of the Great Seal competition, designed by Blamire Young

The seal of King George VI had the design slightly modified, with the swan of Western Australia changing direction and the cross of Queensland being corrected from to moline to a maltese cross. The badge of South Australia were also replaced following their first coat of arms being granted. The border of words was also modified with another line of text used. The seal did not arrive in Australia until 1938.

In 1947, the seal was modified to remove the words referencing the King's title of "Emperor of India" following its independence.

Another design was authorised by Elizabeth II on 17 February 1954 while presiding over the Federal Executive Council in Canberra during her first visit as reigning monarch.

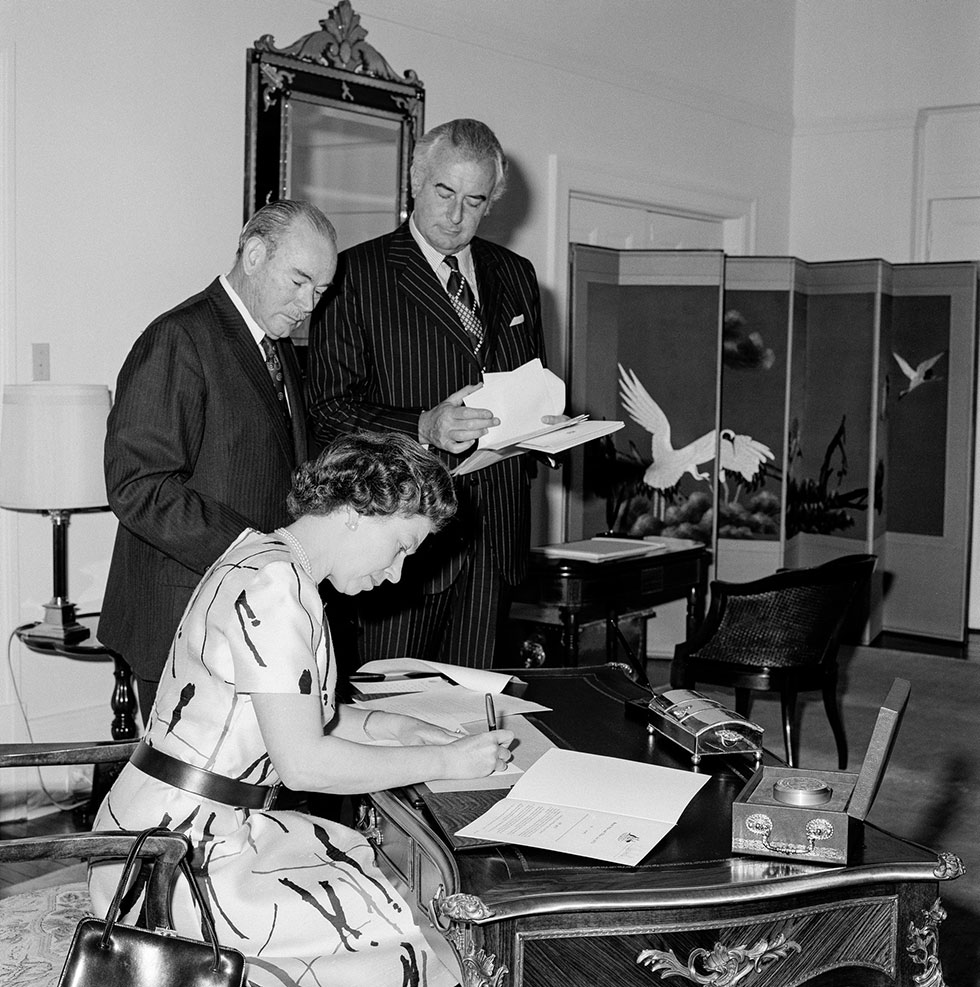
Elizabeth II signing documents next to Paul Hasluck and Gough Whitlam. The Great Seal is visible in the lower right.

The next design was authorised by Elizabeth II on 19 October 1973 during another of her visits to Australia. It featured the coat of arms of Australia, beneath the words Elizabeth the Second and above the words Queen of Australia. The badge of South Australia was also changed back to a piping strike. On this occasion, the Queen also took on the style Queen of Australia, signifying the separate constitutional identity of the monarch from her role in other Commonwealth realms. The design was chosen from the following proposals:

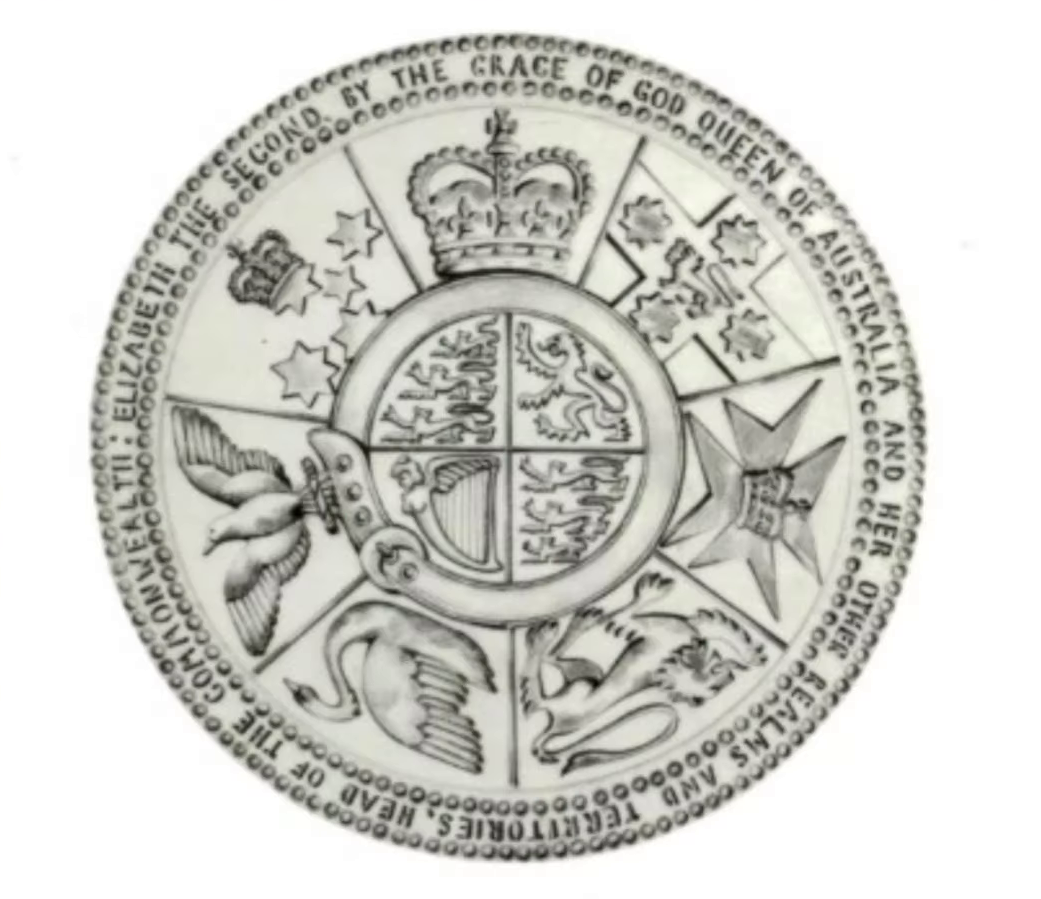

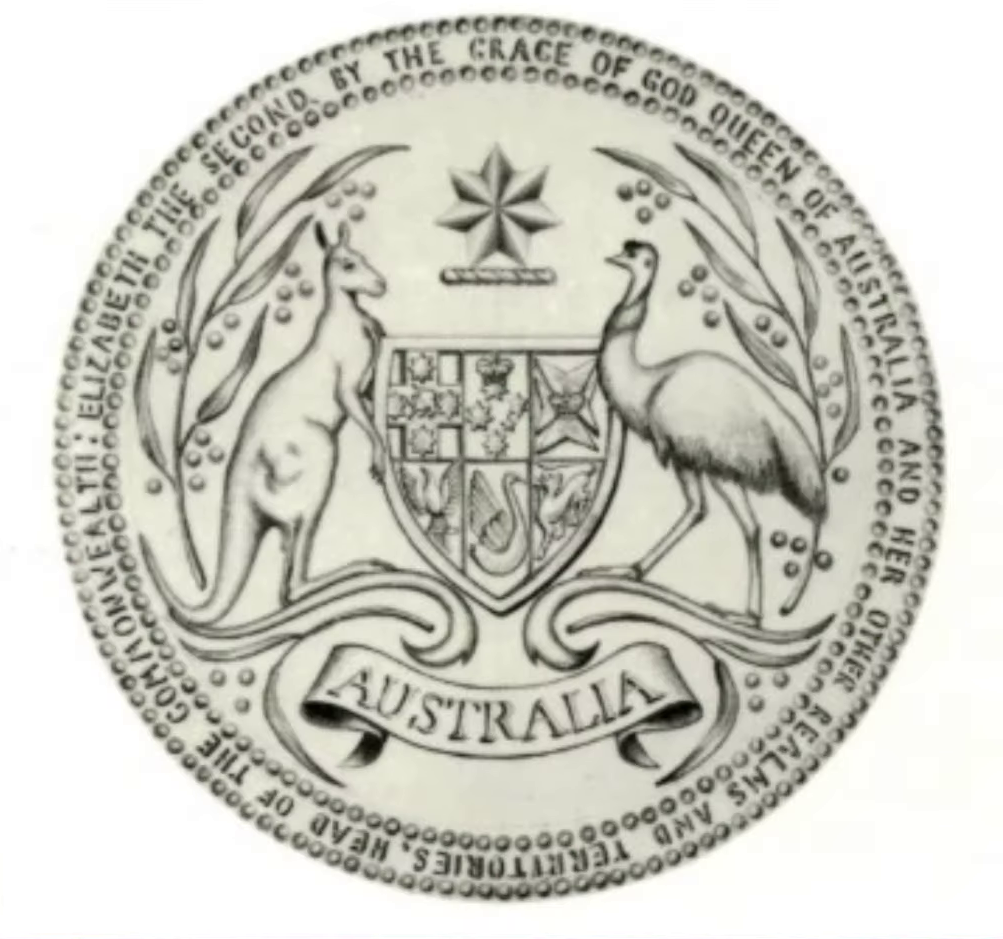

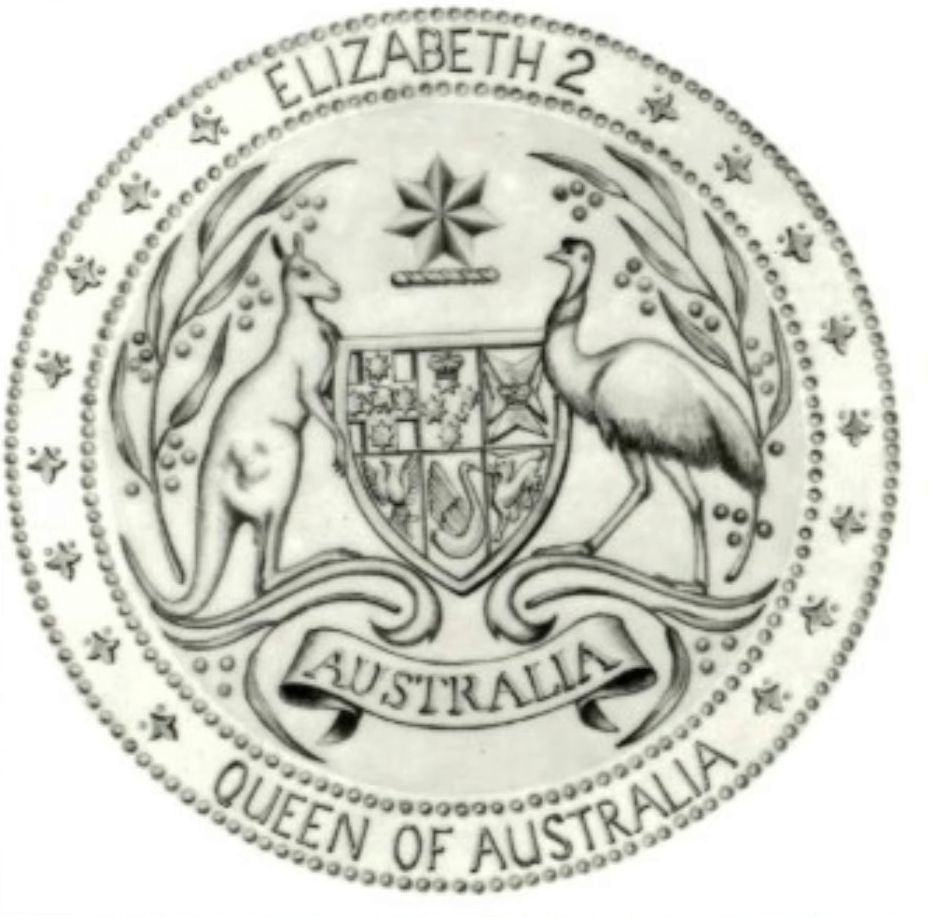

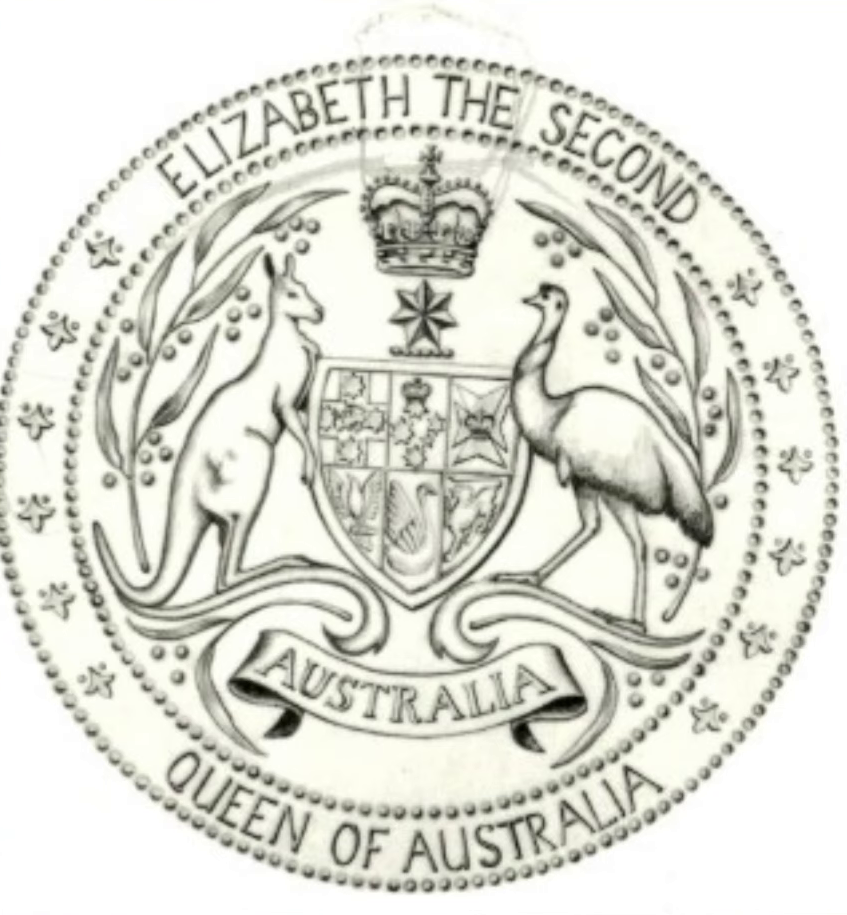

The current design was authorised on 21 October 2024 by King Charles III during his first visit to Australia as monarch. The design is a modification of the previous seal, with the text referencing the monarch removed. Guardian Australia reports that the design was chosen to allow it to be used in perpetuity. It was created by the Royal Australian Mint and cost approximately $15,000.

Sovereign	Seal	Period	Inscription
Personal seal of Lord Hopetoun		29 October 1900–18 July 1902	
Personal seal of Lord Tennyson		18 July 1902–21 January 1904	
Edward VII		21 January 1904–1912	edwardvs vii d:g: britt: et terrarvm transmar: qvæ in dit: svnt brit: rex f:d: ind: imp: commonwealth of australia.
George V		1912–1938	georgivs v d:g: britt: et terrarvm transmar: qvæ in dit: svnt brit: rex f:d: ind: imp: (George V, by the grace of God of the Britains and of the lands across the sea which are in the British Dominion King, Defender of the Faith; of India, Emperor.) commonwealth of australia.
George VI		1938–1947	georgius· vi· dei· gratia· mag· br· hib· et terr· transmar· quæ· in· dit· svnt· brit· rex· fidei· defensor ind· imp· commonwealth of australia
George VI		1947–1954	georgius vi dei gratia mag. br. hib. et terr. transmar. qvae in dit. sunt brit. rex fidei defensor. (George the Sixth, by the Grace of God, of Great Britain, Ireland, and the Lands across the sea which are in the British Dominion. King, Defender of the Faith. Commonwealth of Australia.) commonwealth of australia.
Elizabeth II		1954–19 October 1973	elizabeth ii d.g. britt: terr: avstralis regnorvmqve svorvm ceter: regina. consortionis popvlorvm princeps fid: def: commonwealth of australia Elizabeth II by the grace of God of the Britains, Australia, and her other realms Queen, Head of the Commonwealth, Defender of the Faith
Elizabeth II		19 October 1973–21 October 2024	elizabeth the second. queen of australia.
Charles III		21 October 2024–present	

== State seals ==
=== New South Wales ===
Under the New South Wales constitution, the governor formally provides, keeps and uses the "Public Seal of the State". In fact, the seal is kept at the New South Wales cabinet office and is used by government officials. On 17 January 1861, the governor demanded to use the seal on a deed, however the premier advised against this and threaten to resign if the governor acted otherwise. The governor insisted he be given the seal, so the premier did so, but resigned along with the rest of the ministry. The governor then relented, returning the seal and refused to accept the resignations. However, the governor later fled Sydney on the day of his term expiring in order to avoid a censure motion, being debated in Parliament on the same day.

The first seal of the New South Wales government was granted by King George III in 1790. Its design was used for the second seal in 1817 and a third seal in 1827. It depicted convicts landing at Botany Bay, taking off their shackles and engaging in Industry. The description for the seal in its royal warrant is as follows:

Convicts landed at Botany Bay; their fetters taken off and received by Industry, sitting on a bale of goods with her attributes, the distaff, bee-hive, pick axe, and spade, pointing to an oxen ploughing, the rising habitations, and a church on a hill at a distance, with a fort for their defence. Motto: Sic fortis etruria crevit ['So, I think, this is how brave Etruria grew']; with this inscription round the circumference, Sigillum Nov. Camb. Aust. ['Seal New South Wales']

The fourth seal granted in 1832 by King William IV modified this design, inserting the royal arms above the convict symbolism. The fifth seal granted on the ascension of Queen Victoria kept this design, but removed without explanation the motto Sic fortis etruria crevit (a quote from Virgil's Georgics alluding to the rise of Etruria and the Etruscans and the future greatness the colony could aspire to as a result of expansion of agriculture and industry).

The sixth seal was granted in 1870 removed all references to the convict past of New South Wales and instead emphasised the agricultural prosperity of the colony. The convict imagery was replaced by a golden fleece between two Prince of Wales' feathers beneath the royal arms above nine stars. The golden fleece had become a symbol of New South Wales and it depicted on the current coat of arms. The feathers were a pun referring to the colony's name, while also referencing chivalry and the ancient Principality of Wales. The shedding of convict emblems reflected the increasingly distinct personality the colony had compared with the imperial mother country.

In 1912 the seal's design was changed to include the coat of arms of New South Wales. At least by 2004, the seal depicted a hybrid of the New South Wales coat of arms and the royal arms, with the rising sun that appears above the shield of the NSW arms replaced with the shield of the royal arms. Around the edge of the seal were the words "new south wales" and "elizabeth ii d g br terr avst regn svorvm cet reg consortionis popvlorvm priceps f d" meaning 'Elizabeth II, by Grace of God of Great Britain, Australia, and of her other Realms and Territories Queen'. In 2013 a new seal was created, which depicts only the New South Wales coat of arms.

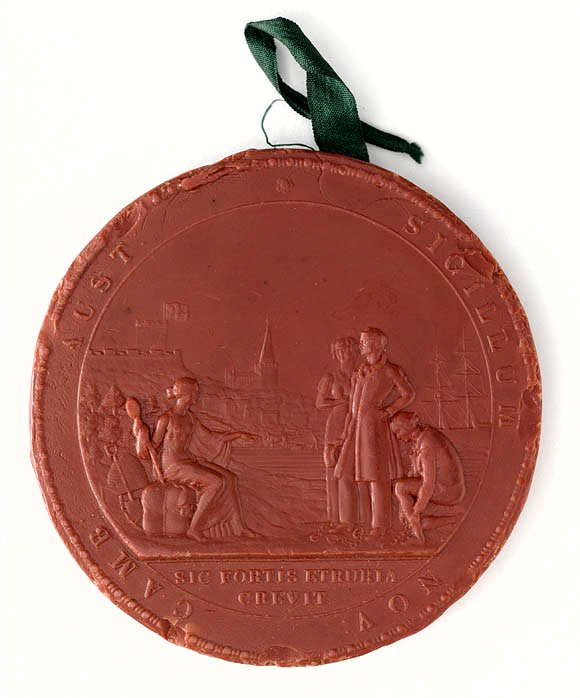
Great Seal of New South Wales (1827-1832)

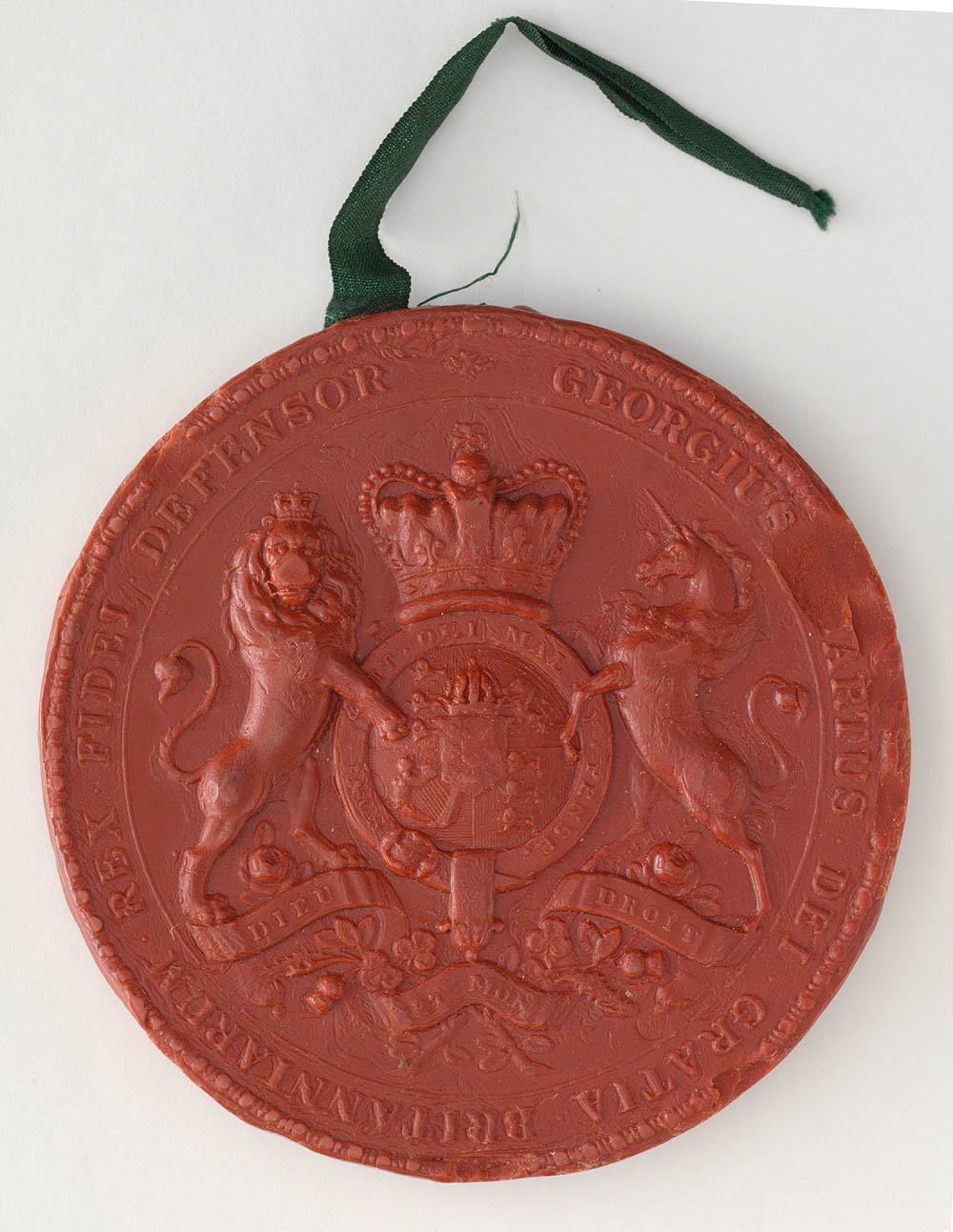
Reverse of the first Great Seal of NSW

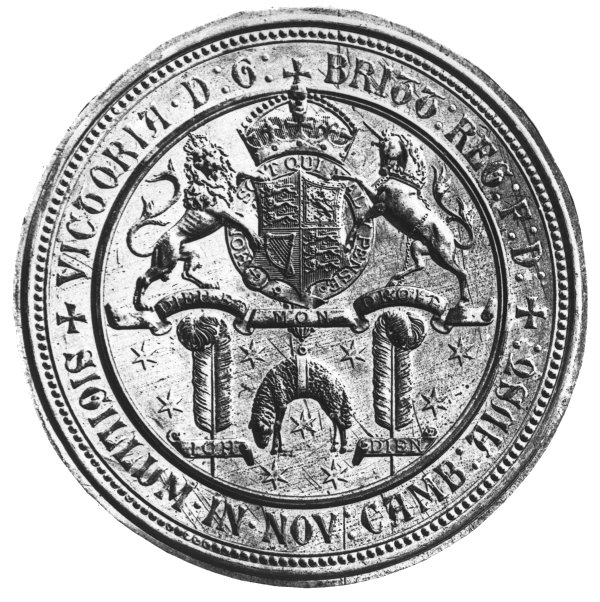
Great Seal of New South Wales (1870-1905)

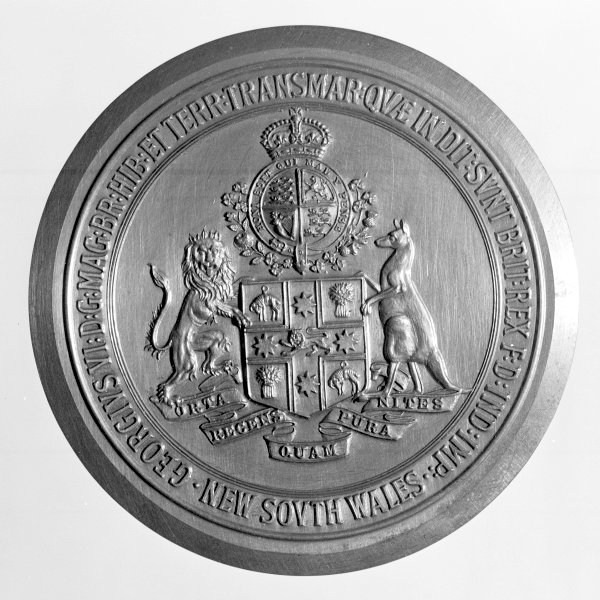
Great Seal of New South Wales (1937-1952)

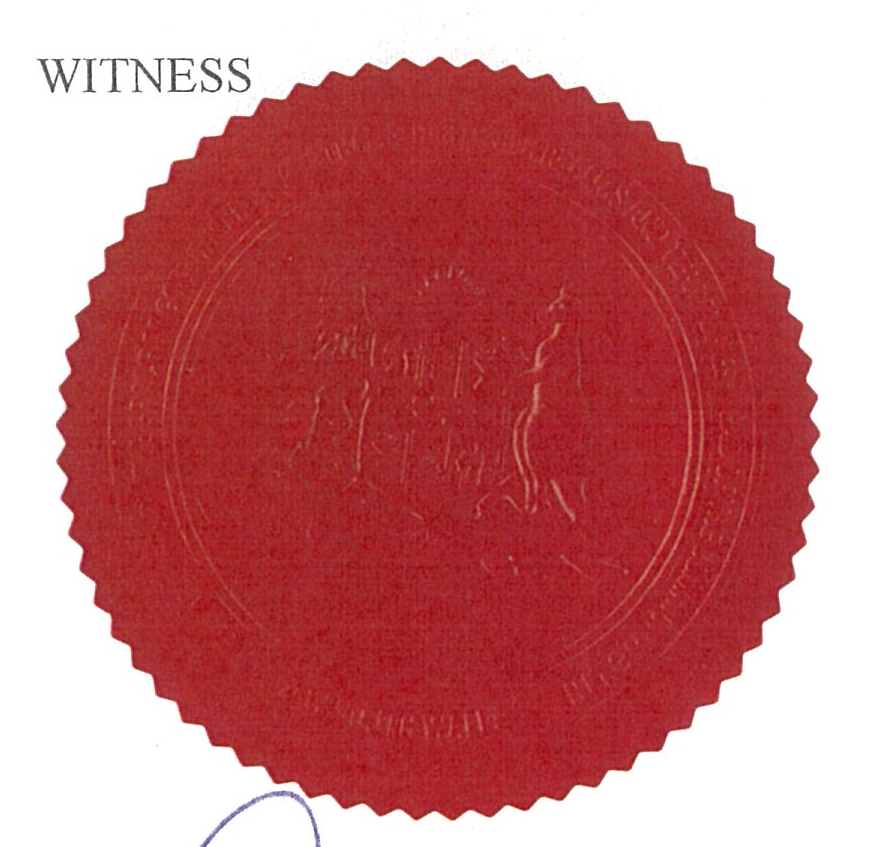
2013 to present

=== Victoria ===
The seal of Victoria depicts the royal arms on the top half and sheep grazing on the bottom half. Inscribed around the outside is "Elizabeth II Dei Gratia Britanniarium Terrae Australis Regnorumque Suorum Ceterorum Regina, Consortionis Populorum Princeps, Fideo Defensor".

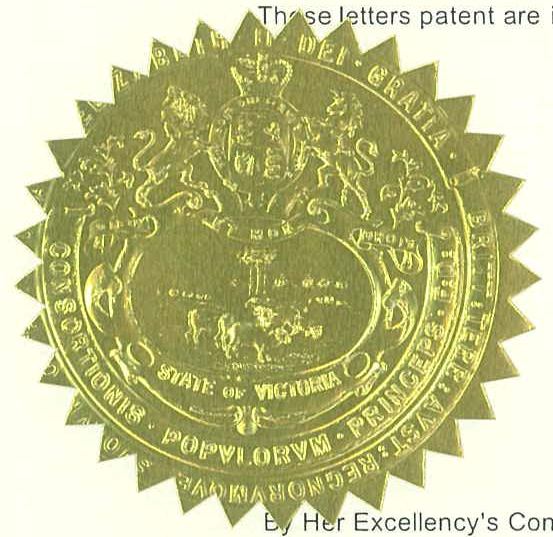
The Great Seal of Victoria, as present on the letters patent of the Yoorrook Justice Commission

=== Queensland ===
The letters-patent establishing the colony of Queensland as an entity separate from New South Wales granted the governor the authority to keep and use the "Great Seal of the Colony". The only surviving depiction of the seal is a hand seal for wax impressions, which depicts Queen Victoria on the Coronation Chair. It is held by the Queensland Museum. After federation, a new seal design was created, which depicted the coat of arms of the UK held by a lion, next to the coat of arms of Queensland held by a kangaroo, above a banana tree. It was designed by Mr JW Purvis, a die maker and engraver following a public competition. The inscription of the seal changed on the ascension of each monarch and the change of style of Queen Elizabeth II to Queen of Australia. The most current inscription reads "elizabeth the second by the grace of god queen of australia and her other realms and territories in the commonwealth".

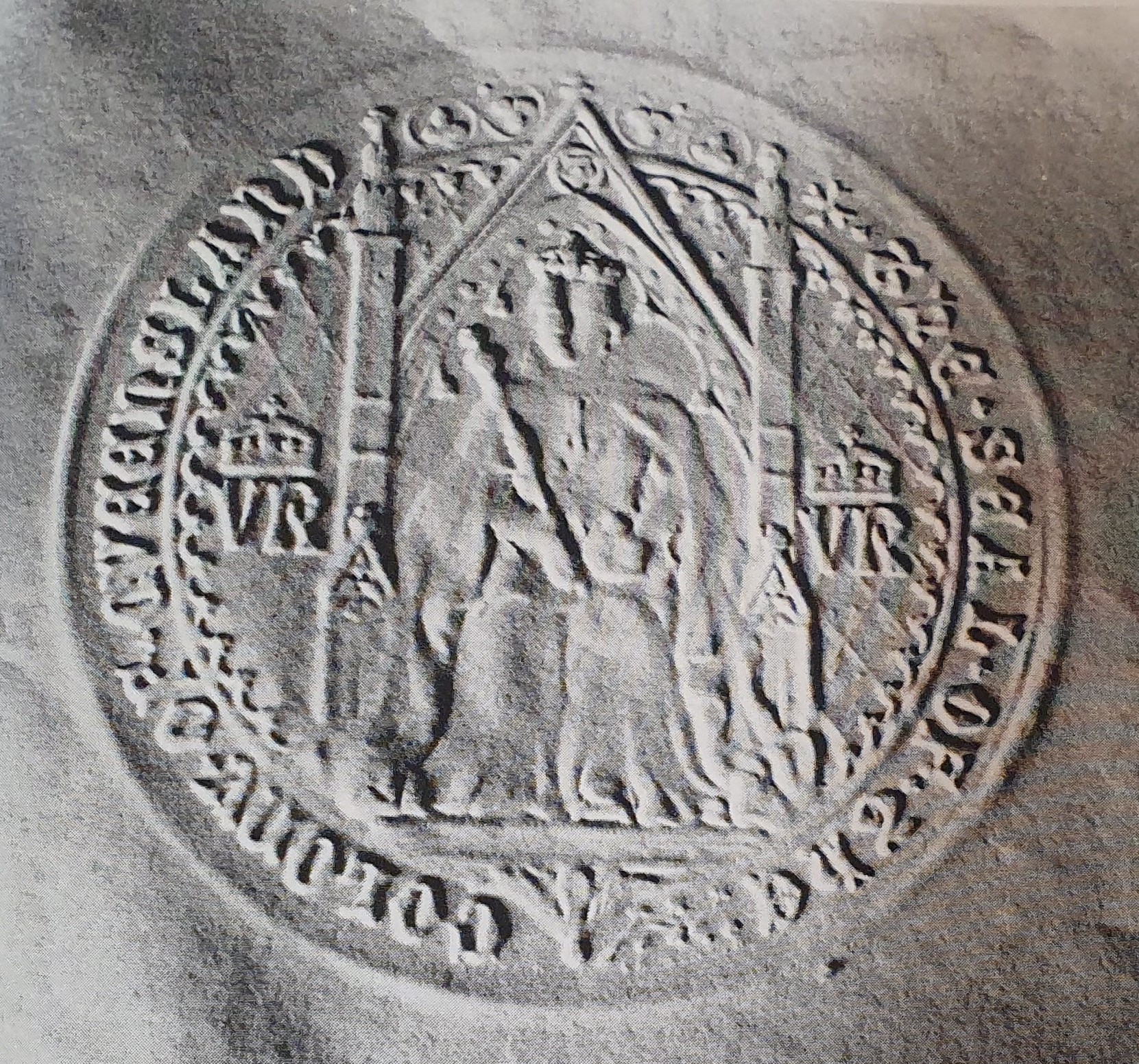
Early seal of the Colony of Queensland

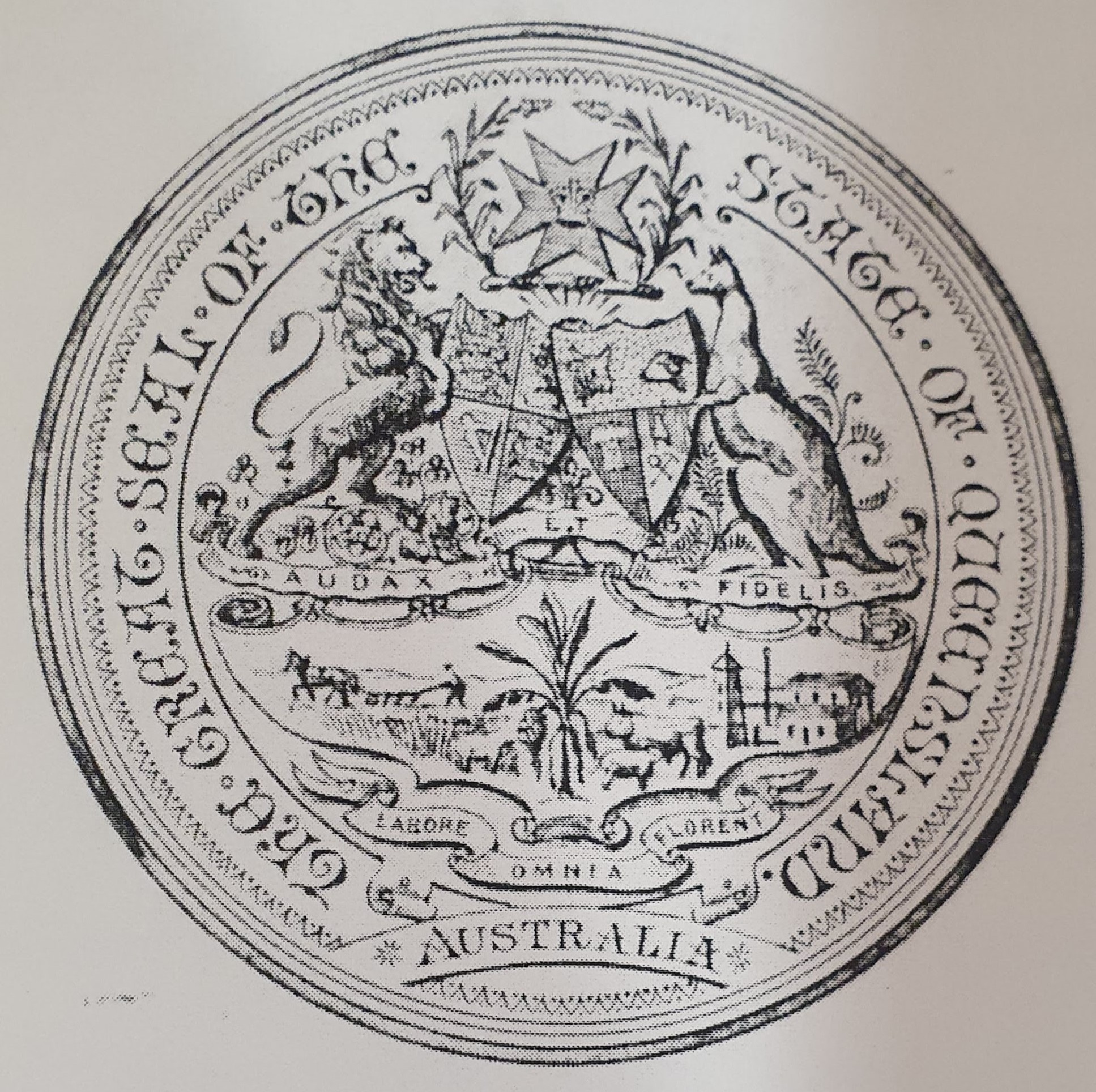
Current design for the Seal of State of Queensland

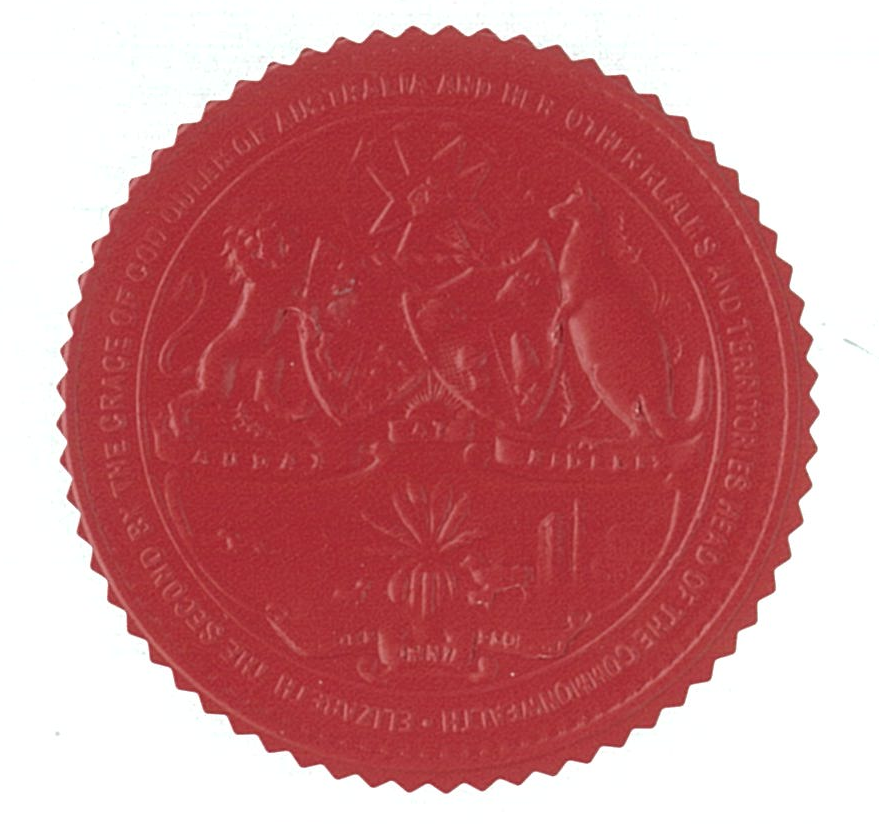
Current seal

=== Western Australia ===
The great seal of Western Australia originally depicted the Royal Coat of Arms of the UK above a black swan. It was used from 1837 until at least 1952. In 2004, a new seal was granted by the governor, exercising the powers of the monarch as conferred on him by section 7 of the Australia Act 1986. It depicts the coat of arms of Western Australia surrounded by the words "the great seal of western australia".

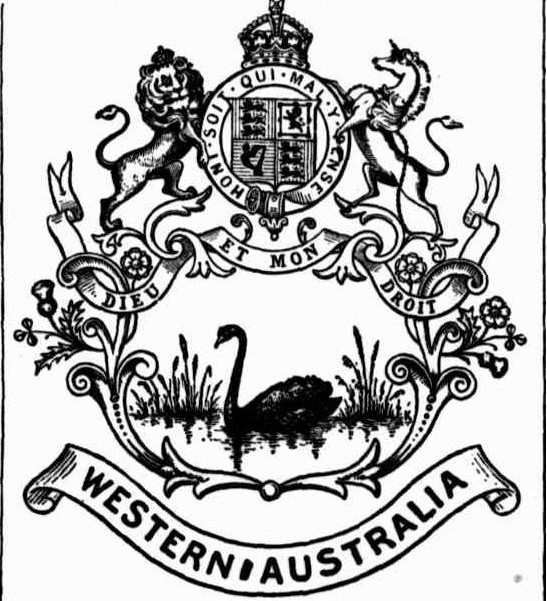
Seal of Western Australia (1837–2004)

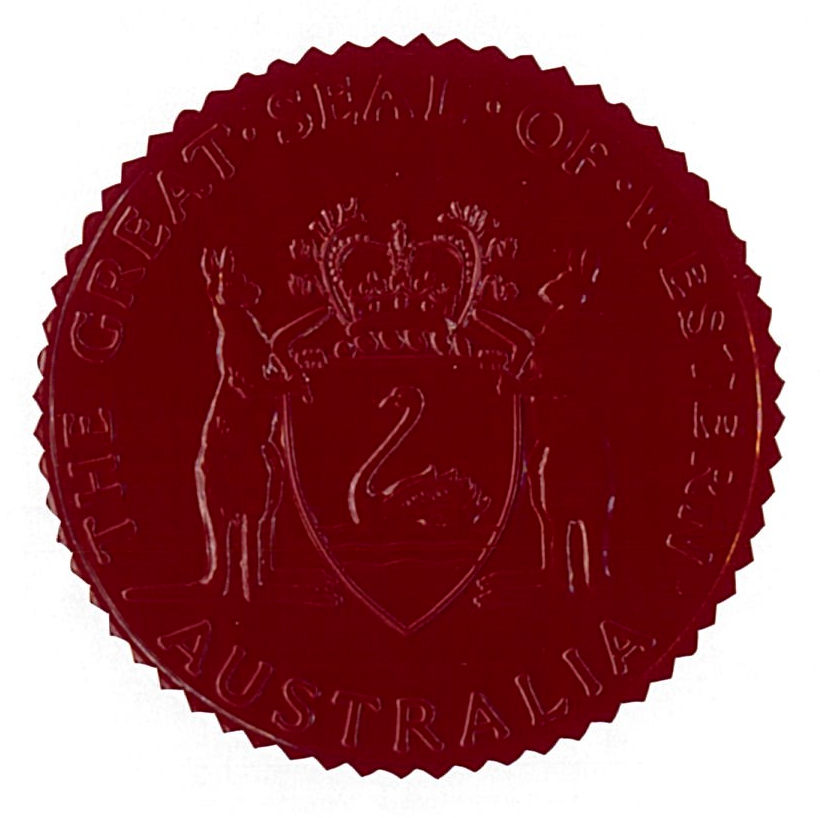
Current Seal of Western Australia (2004 to present)

=== South Australia ===
The public seal of South Australia depicts the royal arms above the state badge: a piping shrike on a gold circle. This design remains in use.

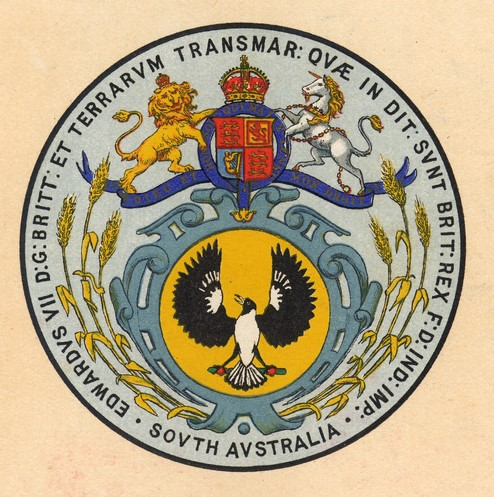
Public Seal of South Australia (~1900)

=== Tasmania ===
The seal of Tasmania in use in 1936 was similar to that of South Australia and Queensland, except that the bottom depicts a group of three people, two standing and one reclining.

== See also ==
- Seal of New Zealand
- Great Seal of the Realm (UK)
- Great Seal of Canada
