= 2024 royal tour of Australia =

2024 tour by King Charles III

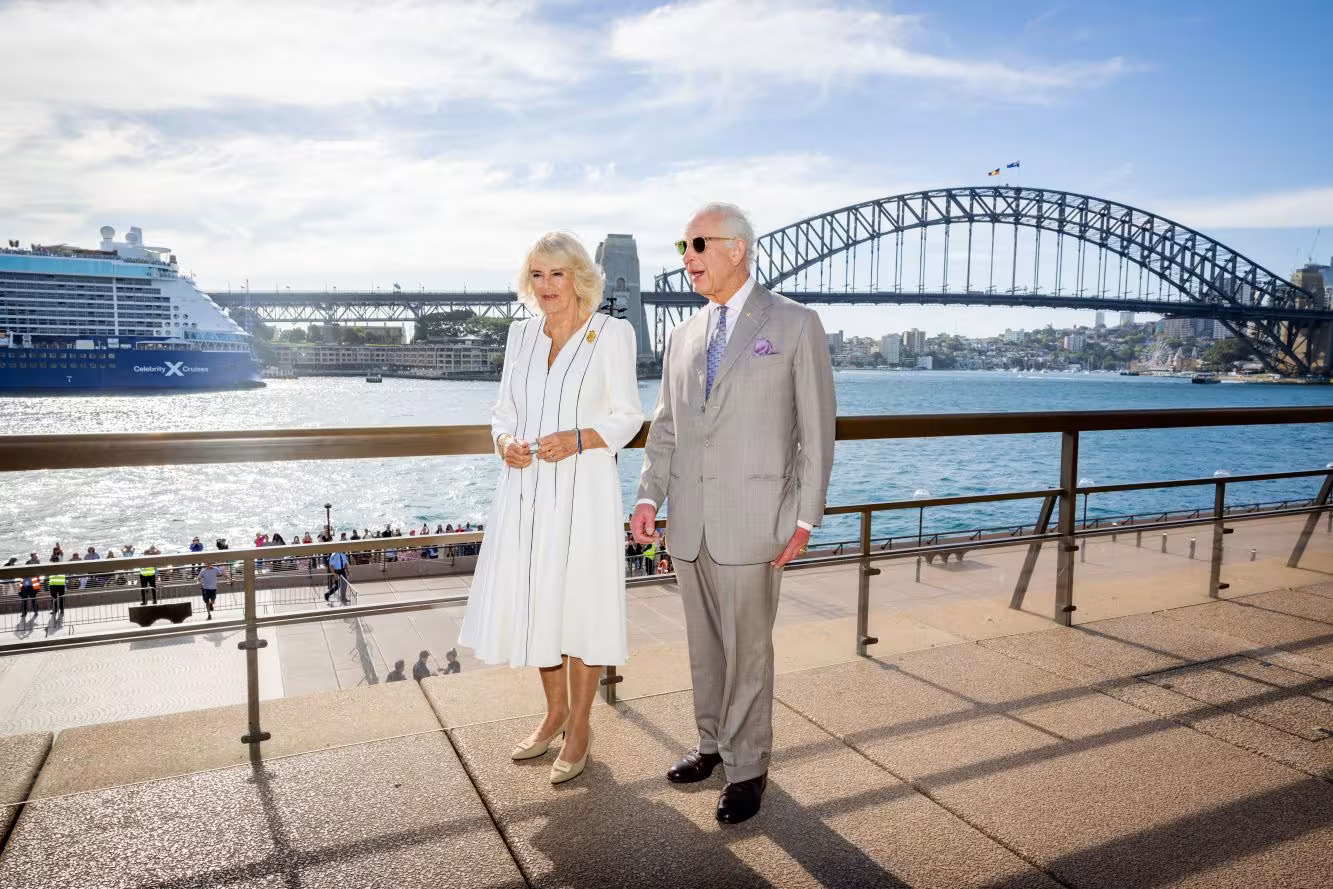
The King and Queen in front of the Sydney Harbour Bridge, 2024

The 2024 royal tour of Australia by Charles III, King of Australia, and Queen Camilla took place from 18 to 23 October 2024. The visit was the first by a reigning monarch to Australia in over a decade and the first by a reigning king. During the tour, the King and Queen undertook engagements in the Australian Capital Territory and New South Wales. This was Charles's 17th visit to Australia.

Following their tour of Australia, Charles and Camilla also made a state visit to Samoa, in their capacity as King and Queen of the United Kingdom, from 23 to 26 October. In Samoa, the King attended the 2024 Commonwealth Heads of Government Meeting, his first as Head of the Commonwealth.

== Background ==
Charles's mother, Queen Elizabeth II became the first reigning monarch to visit Australia in 1954. She visited and toured Australia several more times throughout her reign, the last time being in 2011.

The King's Flag for Australia was used for the first time during the 2024 royal tour

Charles, then-Prince of Wales studied in Australia for six months as a teenager in the 1960s. During his 1994 solo tour of the country, Charles was shot at while on stage during Australia Day celebrations. Charles's cancer diagnosis in February 2024 placed doubts on the prospects of the tour going ahead. It was later announced that the tour would go on, albeit with several changes. The tour was Charles's first visit to a Commonwealth realm since he became King following the death of his mother, Queen Elizabeth II in 2022.

Ahead of the visit, the King adopted a new Australian flag to acknowledge his role as the country's monarch. It was approved on 30 August 2024 and used for the first time during this tour.

== Visit ==
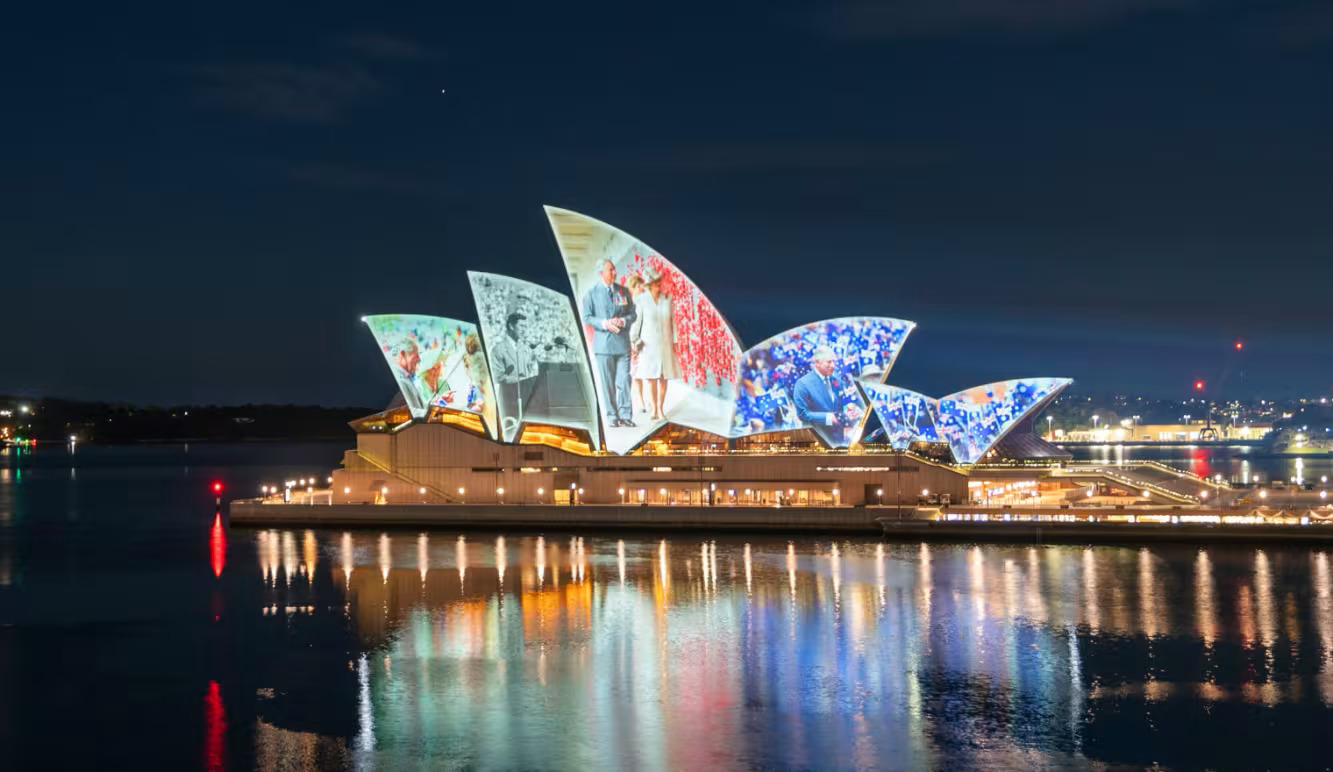
Sydney Opera House lit up with images of previous royal tours of Australia by Charles and Camilla, 2024

Charles and Camilla arrived in Sydney on 18 October and were greeted by Governor-General Samantha Mostyn, New South Wales Governor Margaret Beazley, Prime Minister Anthony Albanese and New South Wales Premier Chris Minns. Sydney Opera House was illuminated with a montage of photos of the King and Queen on their previous visits to Australia in celebration of their arrival.

The royal couple spent 19 October resting before beginning the full schedule of engagements the following day.

=== 20 October ===
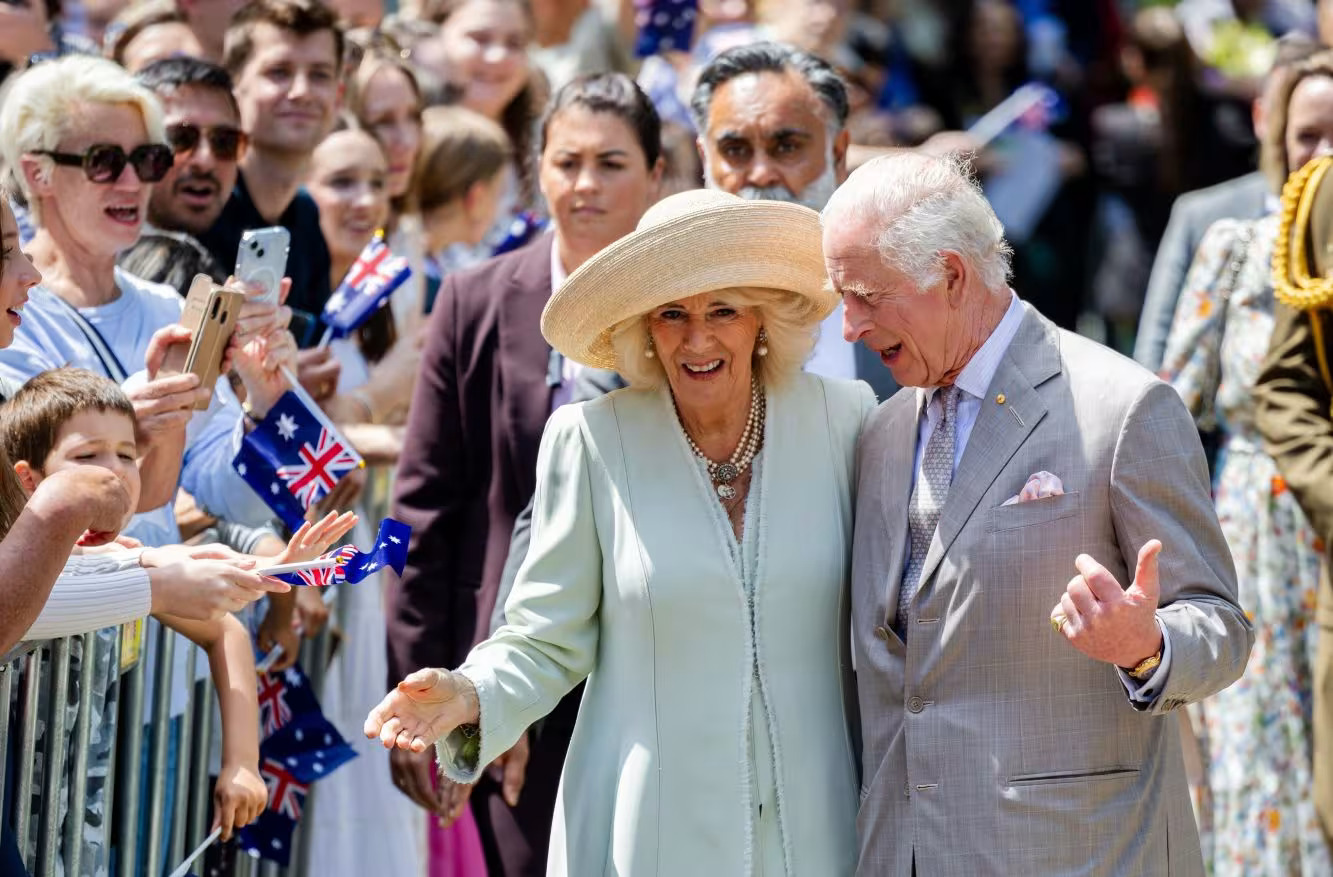
The King and Queen departing St Thomas' Anglican Church, Sydney

In the morning, the King and Queen attended a church service at St Thomas' Anglican Church, where they were received by Kanishka Raffel, the archbishop of Sydney. Later that day, Charles visited the New South Wales Parliament to mark the body's 200th anniversary, where he presented the New South Wales Legislative Council with a timer for debates. The King later held audiences with Governor-General Sam Mostyn and Governor Margaret Beazley at Admiralty House.

=== 21 October ===
Every time I return to the "Sunburnt Country", I am always moved by the hauntingly evocative cries of the Kookaburra, the screeching of the Galah and the warbling of the Magpie.

— Charles III, King of Australia, 2024

Charles and Camilla spent 21 October in Canberra, the Australian capital. They were welcomed by a traditional Smoking ceremony at Defence Establishment Fairbairn. They then visited and laid wreaths at the Australian War Memorial and at the For Our Country Memorial, before attending the parliamentary reception in the Great Hall of Parliament House. Upon arrival at Parliament House, the King was met by the Australian Federation Guard, who conducted a Royal Salute, with military honours, before the King inspected the Guard. The King then, as head of state, delivered a speech at the reception, as did Prime Minister Albanese and Leader of the Opposition Peter Dutton. None of the six state premiers attended the parliamentary reception. After his speech, Charles was heckled by Aboriginal Australian Senator Lidia Thorpe, who accused him of genocide and shouted "you are not my king" and "this is not your land" before being escorted out of the reception. Her comments were widely condemned by fellow politicians including Prime Minister Albanese and Opposition leader Dutton, the latter of whom called for Thorpe's resignation, and received mixed reactions from indigenous leaders. Aunty Violet Sheridan, a Ngunnawal Elder who was present at the reception, labeled Thorpe's comments as "disrespectful". Thorpe was later censured by the Senate for her "disrespectful and disruptive" actions, disqualifying her from representing the chamber as a member of any delegation.

At Government House, the King met with the prime minister and leader of the opposition and revealed the new Great Seal of Australia. Later, the King visited the National Bushfire Behaviour Research Laboratory, while the Queen joined a discussion on domestic violence at Government House. The two then visited the Australian National Botanical Gardens together.

=== 22 October ===
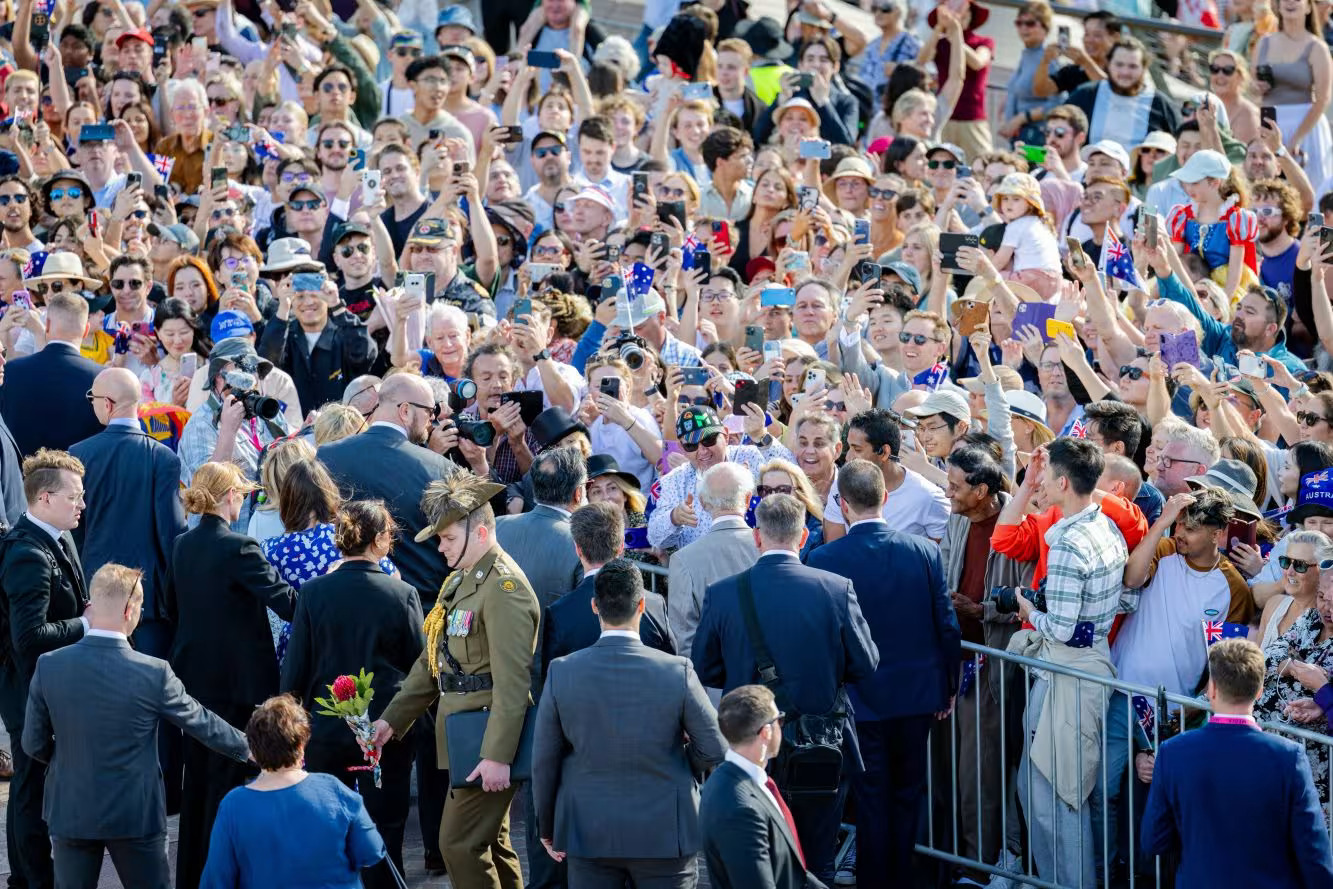
The King and Queen greet crowds outside the Sydney Opera House

The King and Queen spent the fifth day of their visit in Sydney, undertaking a variety of public engagements. Charles began the day by visiting the National Centre of Indigenous Excellence, where he met with a group of Elders and community leaders and took part in his second smoking ceremony of the visit. He later visited Melanoma Institute Australia, where he met skin cancer patients and cancer survivors. The King also launched an Australianversion of his King’s Foundation charity at a reception at Admiralty House in Sydney. The charity’s first project will be as the custodian of the Hillview Estate in Sutton Forest, New South Wales, working to restore the historic property and its surrounding land. Meanwhile, as the patron of UKHarvest, the Queen visited Refettorio OzHarvest and helped to prepare the lunch service. She also visited Green Square Library and met representatives from local Sydney book clubs, Australian authors and past participants of The Queen’s Commonwealth Essay Competition.

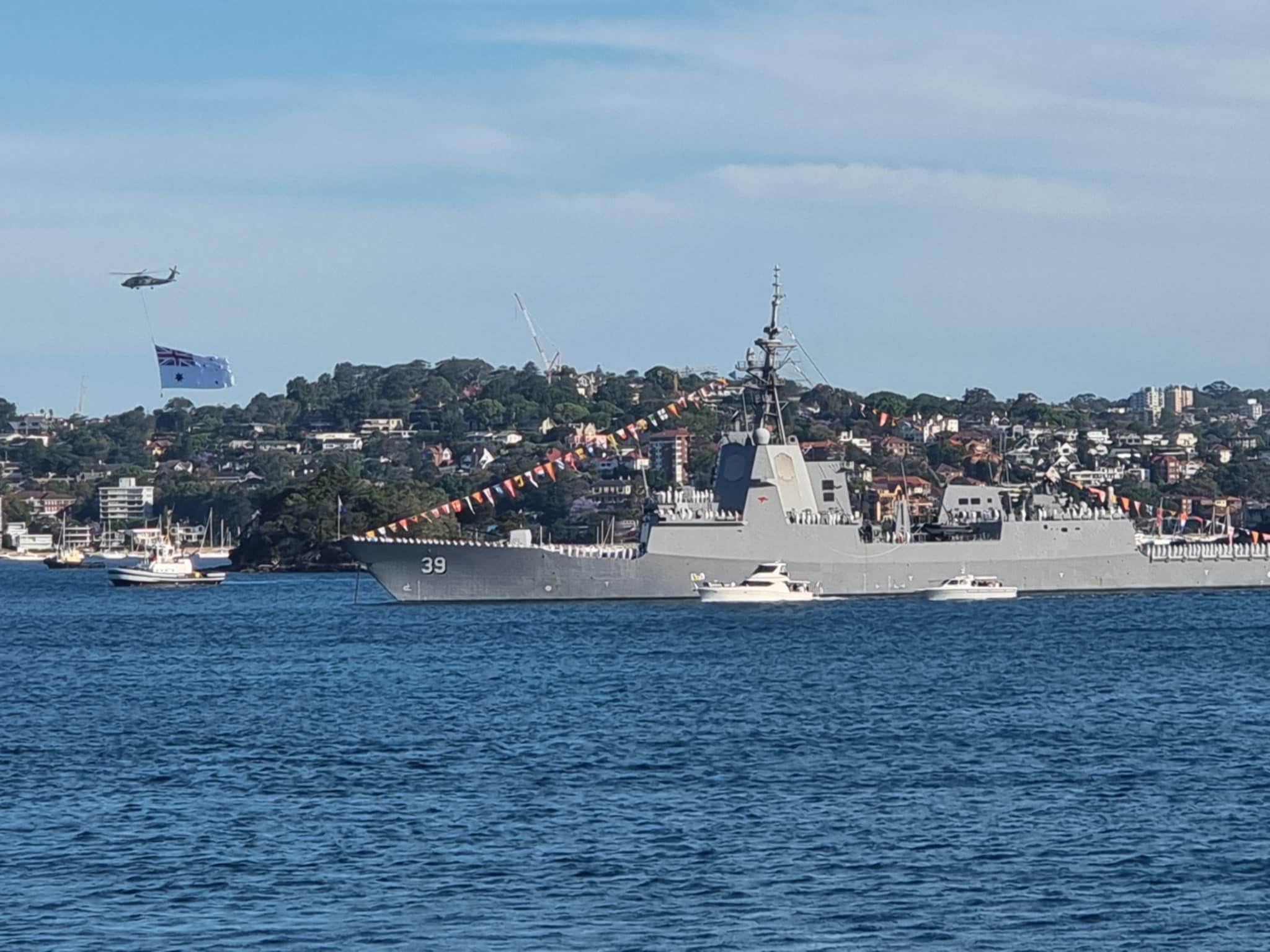
MV Admiral Hudson carrying King Charles III passes HMAS Hobart during the 2024 Royal Fleet Review in Sydney.

Later, Charles and Camilla attended a community barbecue in Parramatta, where they cooked and handed out sausages. The King and Queen then greeted crowds outside the Sydney Opera House, and watched a dance performance performed by school children from schools in the Sydney area. The King then conducted a fleet review of the Royal Australian Navy in Sydney Harbour. The fleet review also included a tri-service flypast by the Australian Defence Force.

=== 23 October ===
The King and Queen were formally farewelled by an official party on the tarmac, which included Governor-General Sam Mostyn and her husband Simeon Beckett. Home Affairs Minister Tony Burke represented Prime Minister Anthony Albanese for the royal couple's departure, while NSW deputy premier Prue Car represented Premier Chris Minns. The King and Queen departed Australia onboard a Royal Australian Air Force plane, and travelled to Samoa to attend the 2024 Commonwealth Heads of Government meeting.

The Australian Government marked the royal visit by making a A$10,000 national contribution to Greening Australia on behalf of all Australians.

== Commentary ==
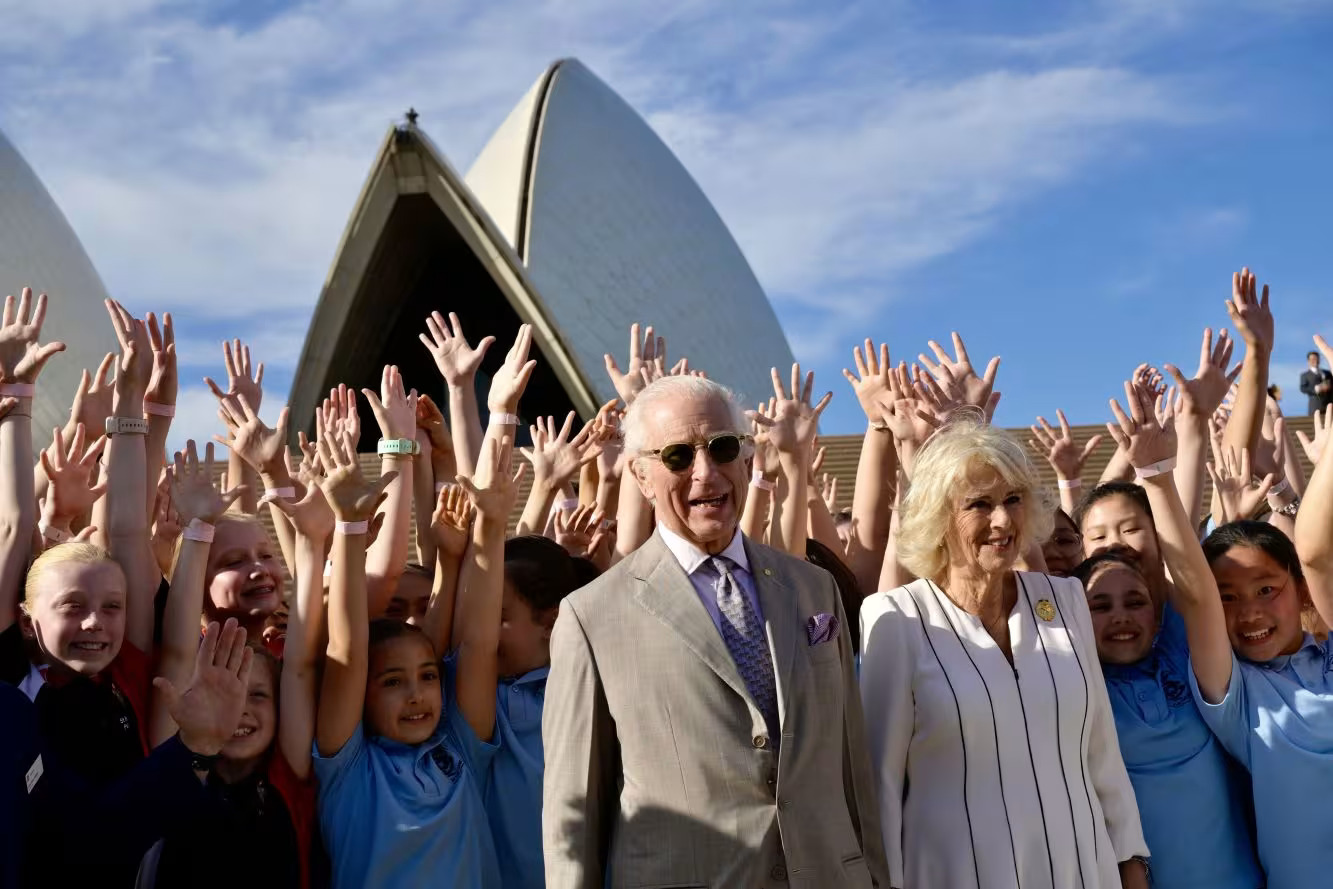
The King and Queen with students outside Sydney Opera House

Daisy Dumas, wrote in The Guardian, that the royal tour showcased a modern and approachable monarchy, noting that the King chose hugs over handshakes. The King and Queen also approved of selfies, happily posing with schoolchildren outside the Sydney Opera House. Politicians in the New South Wales Parliament filmed him, a practice that would have previously been discouraged by royal attendants.

BBC correspondent Sean Coughlan wrote that Senator Thorpe's heckling left the King "completely unruffled", with him seeing free speech as the "cornerstone of democracy".

Reilly Sullivan wrote on Sky News Australia that the King and Queen's visit to Australia "has proven the merits of our perfectly functional constitutional monarchy".

== Polling ==
An opinion poll conducted by Roy Morgan from 22–23 October, shortly after the royal tour, found 57 per cent of respondents believing Australia should remain a monarchy, while 43 per cent believed it should become a republic.

== See also ==
- 2022 royal tour of Canada
- Monarchy of Australia
