= David Henry Souter =

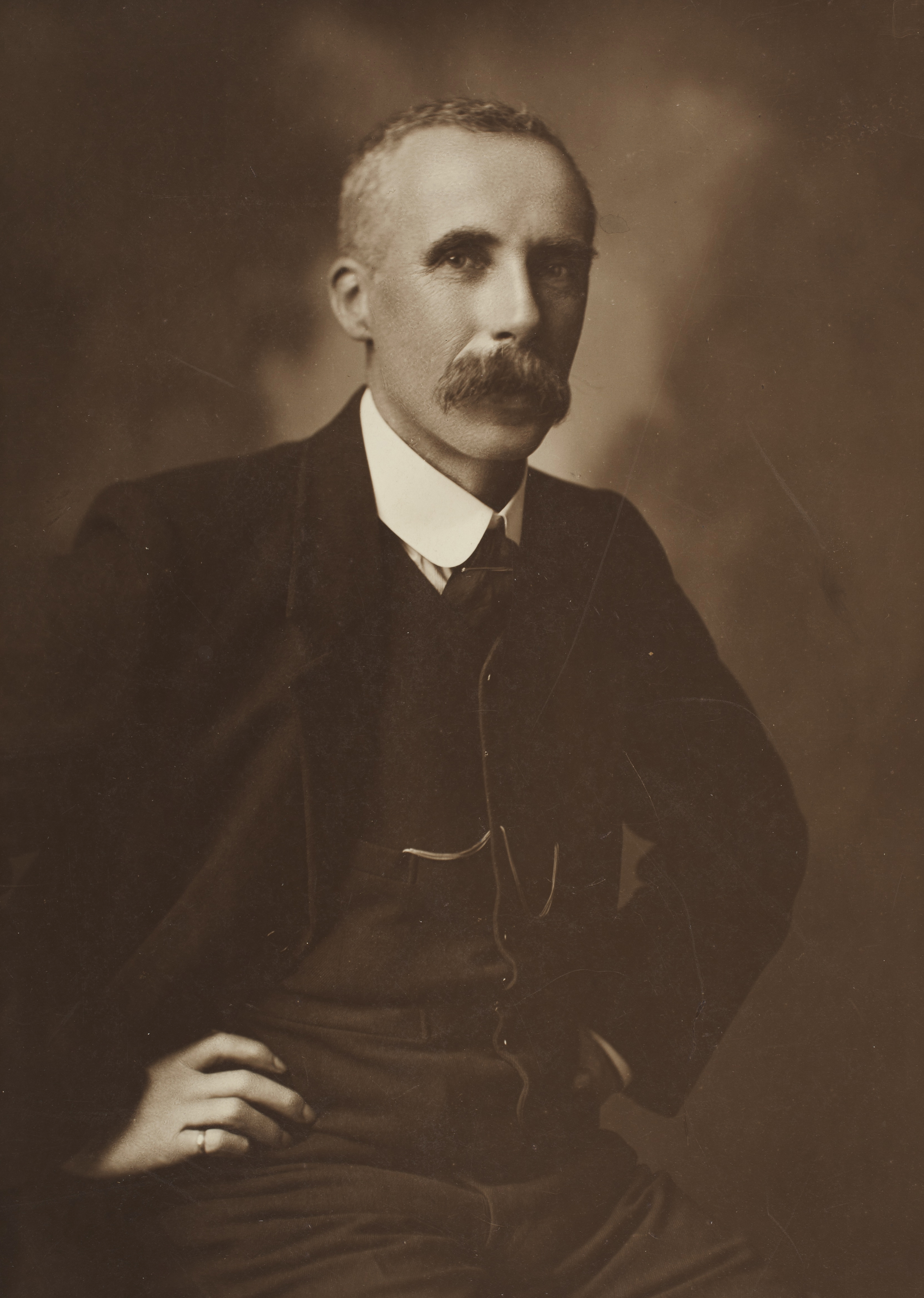
- Born: 30 March 1862; Aberdeen, Scotland
- Died: 22 September 1935 (aged 73); Bondi, New South Wales, Australia
- Citizenship: Australian
- Occupations: Artist, Journalist
- Spouse: Jessie Swanson
- Children: 2 sons, 3 daughters
- Parent(s): David Henry Souter and Ann Smith, née Gran

David Henry Souter (30 March 1862 – 22 September 1935) was an Australian artist and journalist.

== Biography ==
Souter was born in Aberdeen, Scotland, the son of David Henry Souter, an engineer, and his wife Ann Smith, née Grant. He did an apprenticeship under a house painter and sign maker when he was 12. Souter studied art at the local branch of the South Kensington school, studying drawing, contributed to a local journal from 1880, Bon Accord, and in 1881 relocated to Natal, where he engaged in journalism.

Souter married Jessie Swanson (died 1932) on 17 February 1886 and, together moved in 1886 to Melbourne, Australia, then in 1887 settled in Sydney, where Souter obtained a position as an illustrator with John Sands and Co., some time later moving to William Brooks & Co. Ltd.

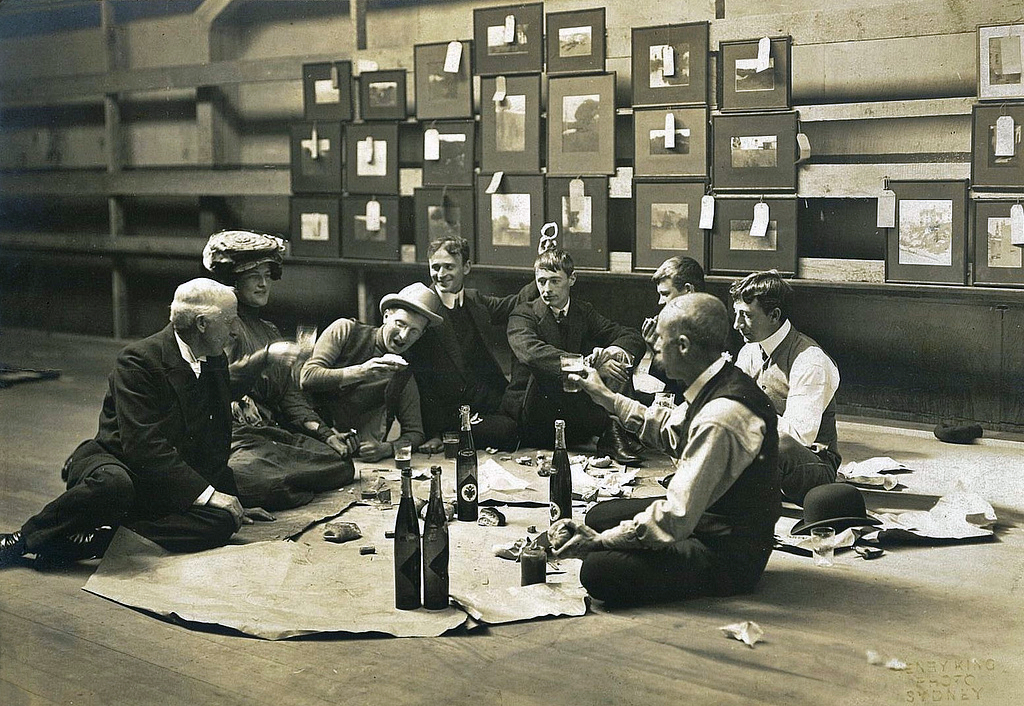
Henry Souter (front, right) with a group of artists including Julian Ashton (left) and Norman Lindsay (5th from left) at the Society of Artists' Selection Committee, 1907.

Souter died suddenly at his home in Bondi, New South Wales on 22 September 1935, and was survived by two sons and three daughters.

== Gallery of works ==
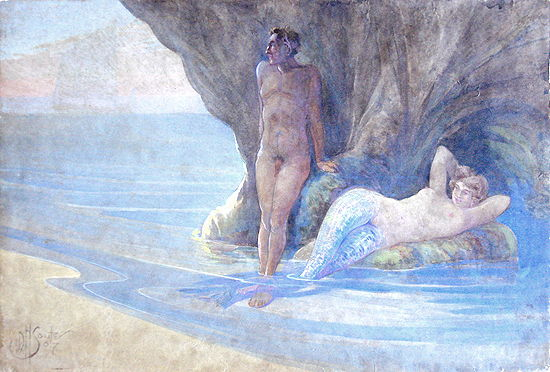
Mermaid with Companion, 1907

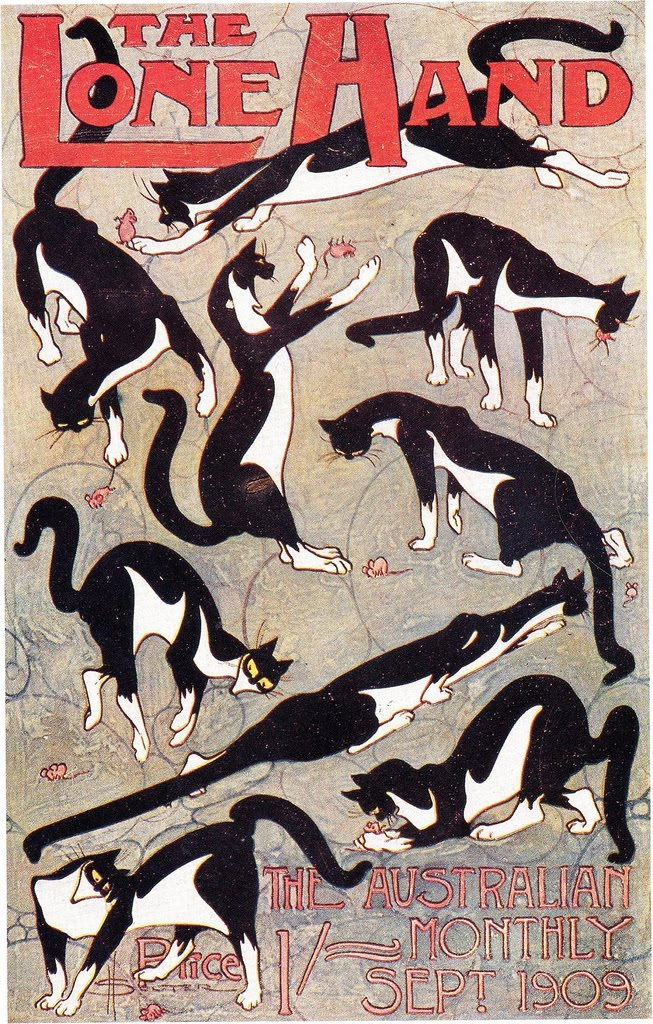
Souter's cover design for The Lone Hand magazine, 1909

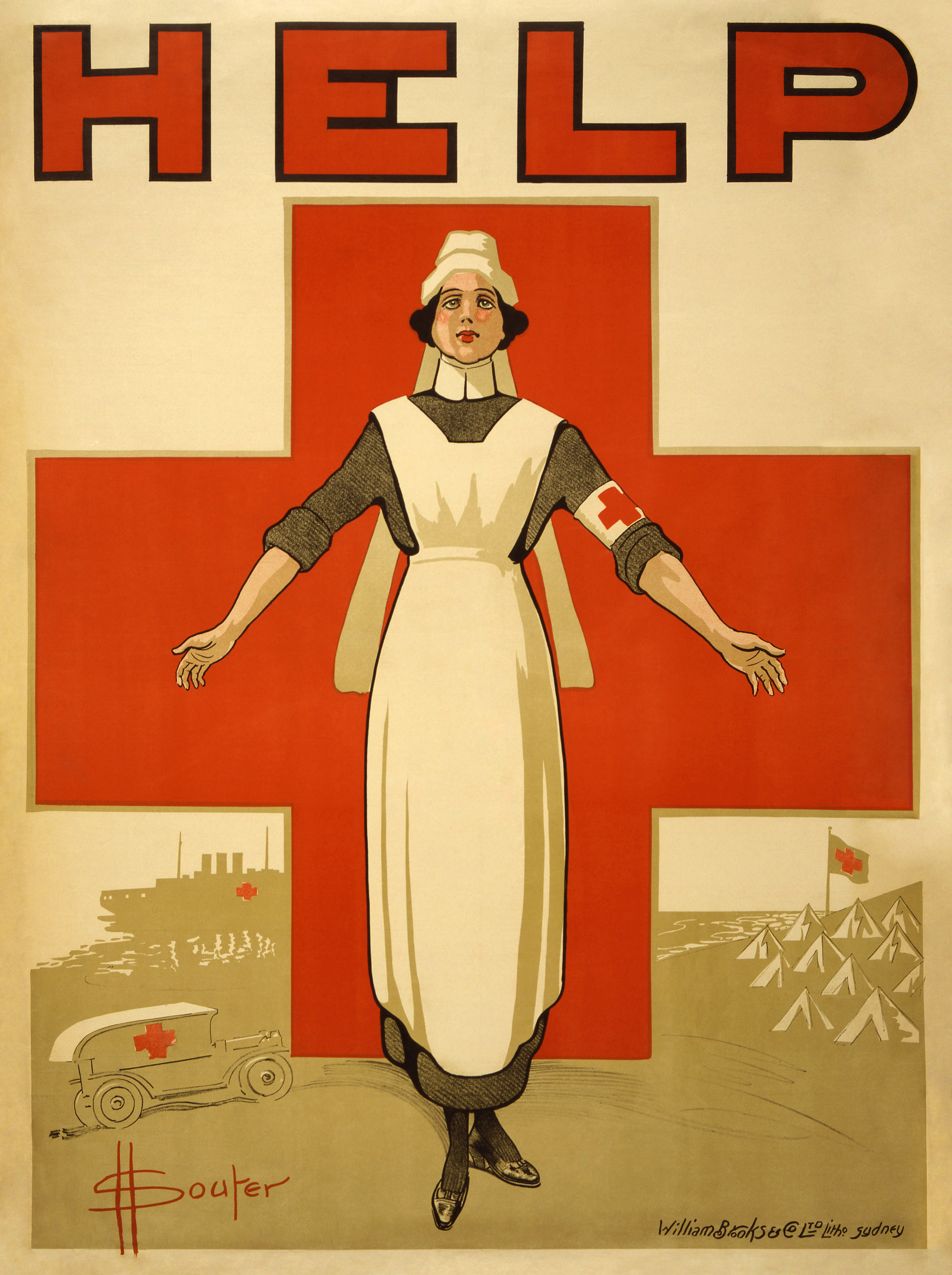
Poster by Souter for World War I recruitment campaign for nurses

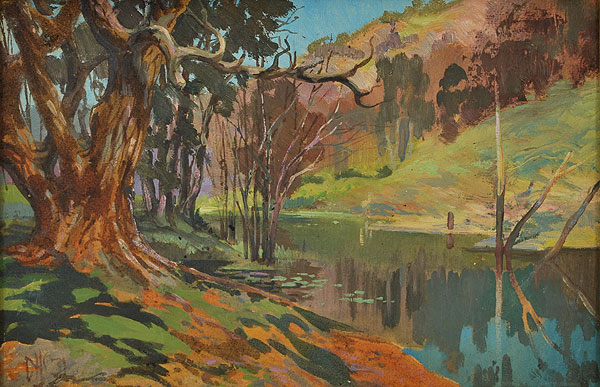
Sheep Amongst The Trees, 1931

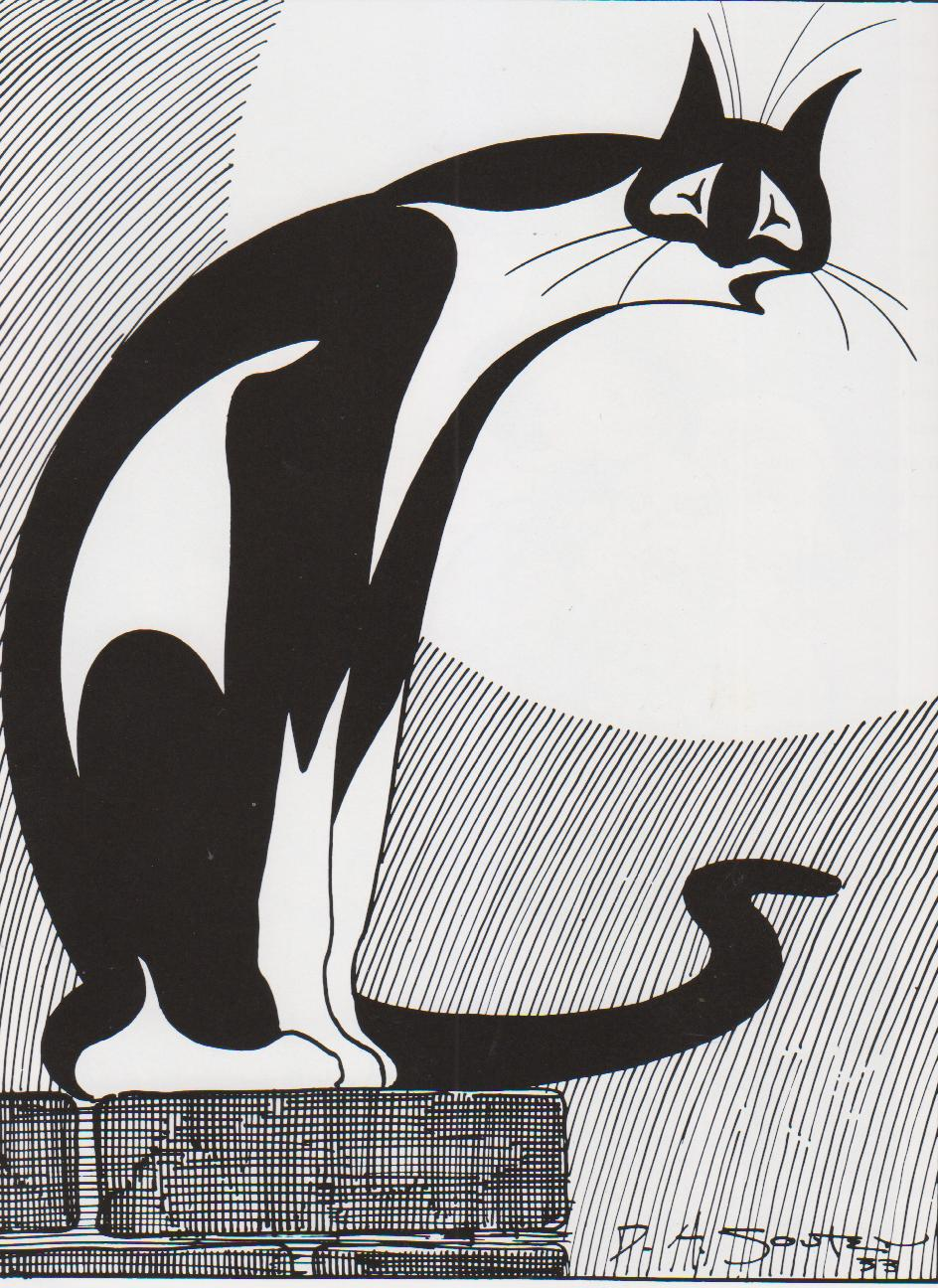
Jilted, 1933

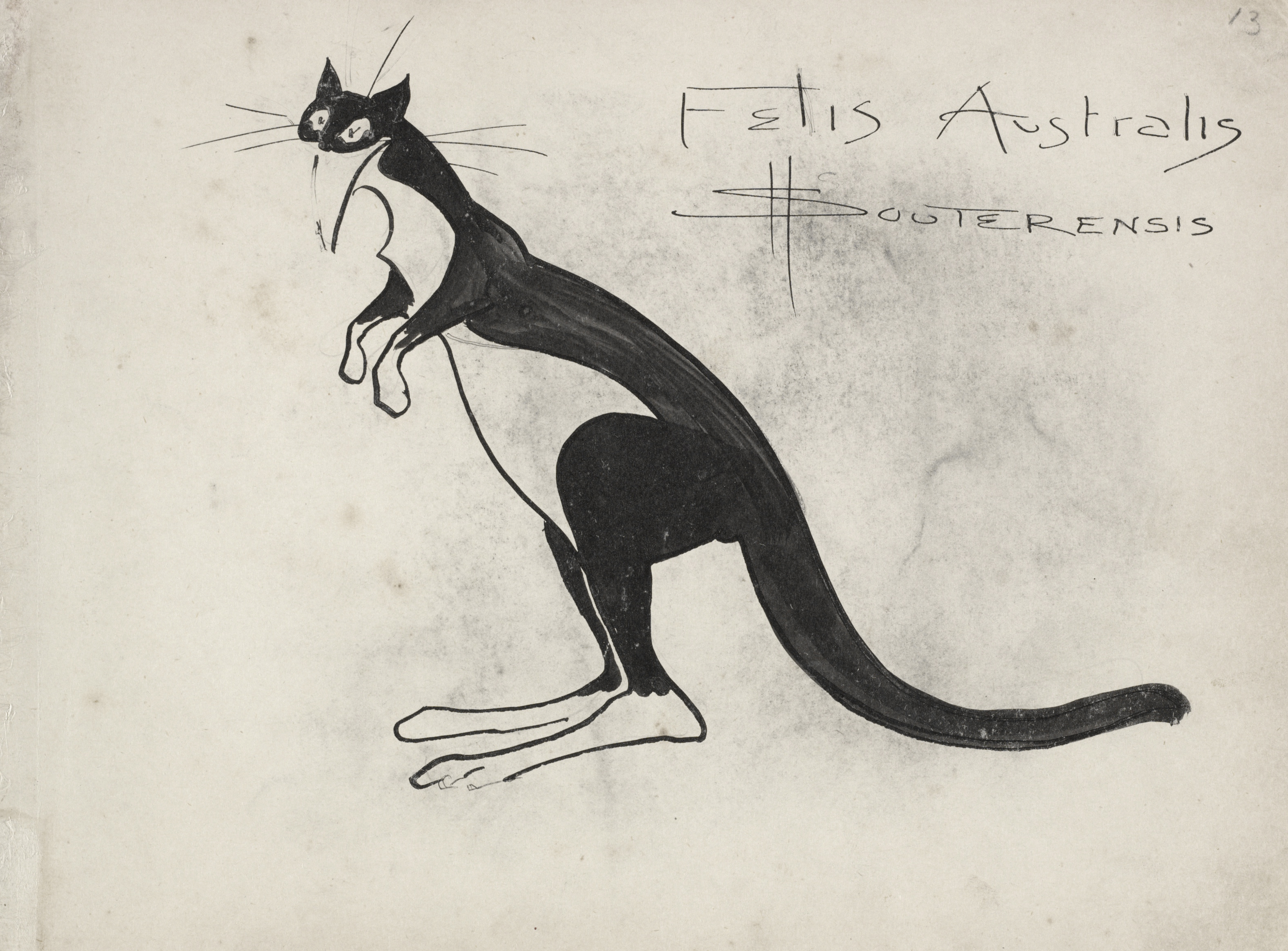
Felis Australis, Souterensis, c.1910, by D.H. Souter
